= African-American culture =

African-American culture, also known as Black American culture or Black culture in American English, refers to the cultural expressions of African Americans, either as part of or distinct from the mainstream American culture. It is defined by a history of collective struggle for civil and political rights, and rooted in shared practices, identities, and communities.

African-American culture has been influential on American and global culture. African-Americans have made major contributions to American literature, music, visual art, media, politics, science, business, and cuisine. Notably, African-American musical forms such as jazz, rock and roll, and hip-hop have been among the United States' most successful cultural exports.

African American culture has always been defined, in part, by the struggle to resist and overcome racist laws and practices, including but not limited to enslavement, oppressive legislation like discriminatory Jim Crow laws, and societal segregation, as well as overt denial of basic human rights. Racism has caused African-Americans to be excluded from many aspects of American life throughout American history, and these experiences have profoundly influenced African-American culture, and informed how African Americans choose to interact with the broader American society.

A heritage of West and Central African stories, proverbs, wordplay, and legends has informed African-American culture since the time of slavery. Religious and spiritual life have informed many aspects of African American culture, including the Civil Rights Movement.

Throughout the year, African Americans observe various holidays. In the United States, Black History Month is celebrated every February to honor the rich history and contributions of African Americans. Juneteenth, observed on June 19, commemorates the end of slavery in the U.S. Additionally, many African Americans celebrate Kwanzaa from December 26 to January 1.

African American culture is not simply defined by race or historical struggle but is deeply rooted in shared practices, identity, and community.

== History ==
African American slaves in Georgia, 1850

African Americans are the result of an amalgamation of many different countries, cultures, tribes and religions during the 16th and 17th centuries, broken down, and rebuilt upon shared experiences and blended into one group on the North American continent during the trans-Atlantic slave trade and are now called African American.

Most African Americans are the descendants of enslaved people who lived within the boundaries of the present United States. In addition, African Americans that are American Descendants of Slavery (ADOS) are primarily of West African and coastal Central African ancestry, with varying amounts of Western European and Native American ancestry.

Roughly one-in-five Black people in the U.S. are immigrants or children of Black immigrants, often from Africa, Latin America, the Caribbean, etc. While some Black immigrants or their children may also come to identify with African Americans, Black immigrants to the U.S. are not part of the African American ethnic group. The majority of first-generation immigrants from Africa prefer to identify with their nation of origin. There is some recent research which shows that some Black immigrants to the US resist assimilation to reduce exposure to racial discrimination faced by native-born African Americans.

African American culture emerged amid systemic anti-Black racism in the United States, characterized by widespread violence, oppression and exclusion driven by white supremacy during the European colonial era.

=== Shared history in the Americas ===
From the earliest days of American slavery in the 17th century, slave holders sought to exercise control over their people who were forced into slavery by attempting to strip them of their African culture. In the New World in general and in the United States in particular, the physical isolation and the societal marginalization of African enslaved people, and, later, the physical isolation and the societal marginalization of their free progeny, facilitated the retention of significant elements of traditional culture among Africans. Slave holders deliberately tried to repress independent political or cultural organization in order to deal with the many slave rebellions or acts of resistance that took place in the United States, Brazil, Haiti, and the Dutch Guyanas.

Various African traditions provided a foundation for the spiritual practices of enslaved individuals, who blended ancestral beliefs with Christianity to create various forms of worship. This cultural resilience was evident in slave rebellions, which challenged the institution of slavery and fostered a sense of community and shared identity among African Americans. The civil rights movement emerged as a powerful continuation of this struggle. This historical legacy influenced contemporary African-American families and shaped their values, community structures, and approaches to political engagement, with the enduring economic impacts of systemic inequality driving a commitment to empowerment and social change.

The imprint of Africa is evident in politics, economics, language, music, hairstyles, fashion, dance, religion, cuisine, and worldview. Throughout all of this, African Americans created their own culture and history in the United States. In turn, African-American culture has had a pervasive and transformative impact on many elements of mainstream American culture. This process of mutual creative exchange is called creolization. Over time, the culture of African slaves and their descendants has had a ubiquitous impact on the dominant American culture and on world culture.

=== Oral tradition ===
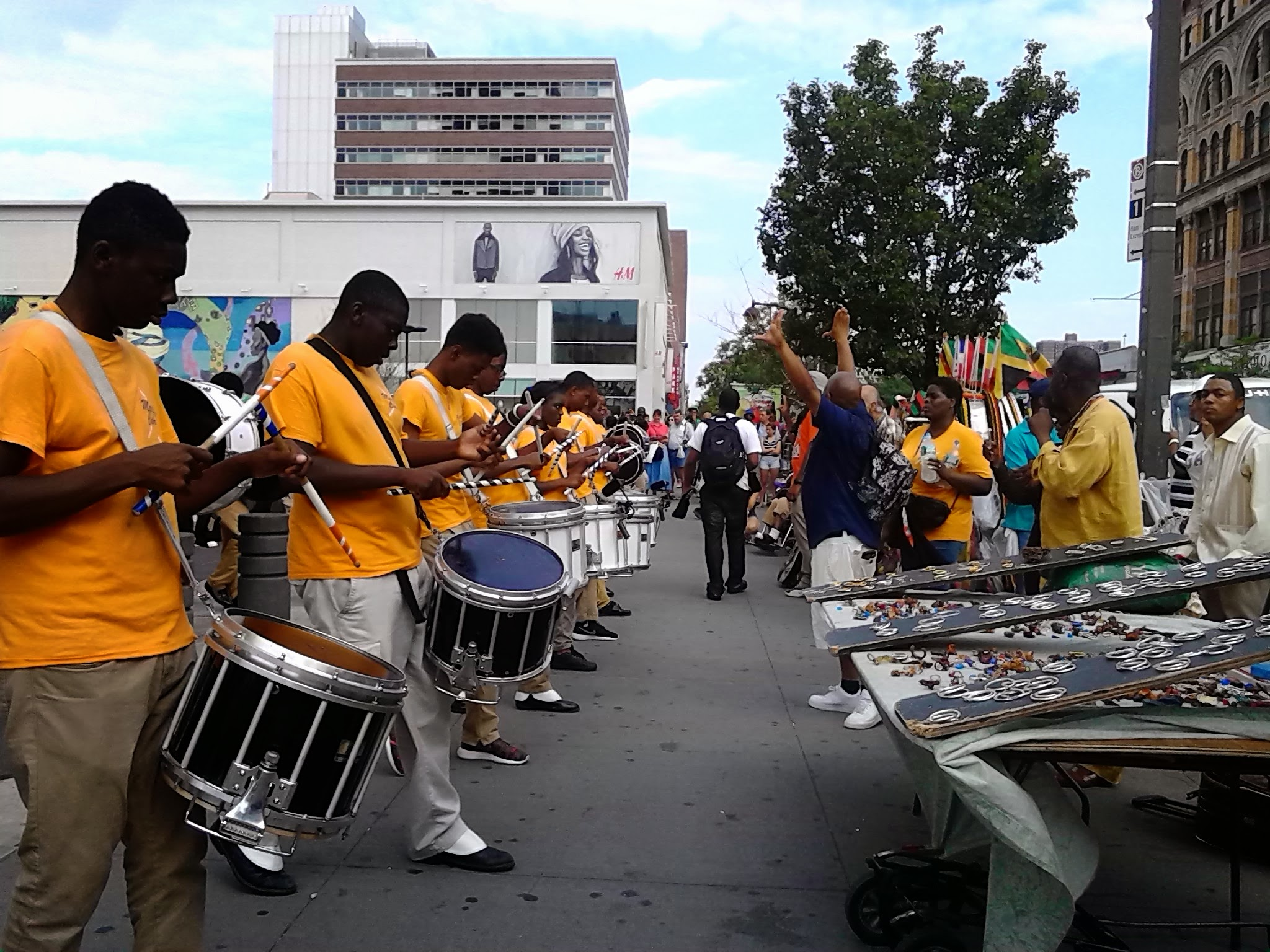
Band rehearsal on 125th Street in Harlem, the historic epicenter of African-American culture. New York City is home by a significant margin to the world's largest African-American population of any city outside Africa, at over 2.2 million. African immigration to New York City is now driving the growth of the city's African-American and African population.

The holders of enslaved trapped people (slaves) limited or prohibited their education, the fear was that education might empower the people, and inspire or enable emancipatory ambitions. African-based oral traditions became the primary means of preserving history, mores, and other cultural information among the people. This was consistent with the griot practices of oral history in many native African culture and other cultures that did not rely on the written word. Many of these cultural elements have been passed from generation to generation through storytelling. The folktales provided African-Americans the opportunity to inspire and educate one another.

Modernity and migration of African-American communities to the North has had a history of placing strain on the retention of African-American cultural practices and traditions. The urban and radically different spaces in which black culture was being produced raised fears in anthropologists and sociologists that the southern African-American folk aspect of black popular culture were at risk of being lost within history.

Other aspects of African-American oral tradition include the dozens, signifying, trash talk, rhyming, semantic inversion and word play, many of which have found their way into mainstream American popular culture and become international phenomena. During slavery, African Americans adapted these linguistic traditions as a form of covert resistance and survival. Spoken-word poetry is another example of how the African-American oral tradition has influenced modern popular culture. Spoken-word artists employ the same techniques as African-American preachers including movement, rhythm, and audience participation. Rap music from the 1980s and beyond has been cited as an extension of African oral culture.

=== Harlem Renaissance ===
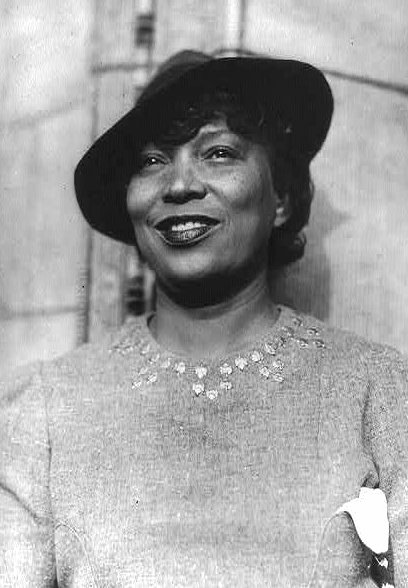
Zora Neale Hurston was a prominent literary figure during the Harlem Renaissance

The first major public recognition of African-American culture occurred during the Harlem Renaissance pioneered by Alain Locke. In the 1920s and 1930s, African-American music, literature, and art gained wide notice. Authors such as Zora Neale Hurston and Nella Larsen and poets such as Langston Hughes, Claude McKay, and Countee Cullen wrote works describing the African-American experience. Jazz, swing, blues and other musical forms entered American popular music. African-American artists such as William H. Johnson, Aaron Douglas, and Palmer Hayden created unique works of art featuring African Americans.

The Harlem Renaissance was also a time of increased political involvement for African Americans. Among the notable African-American political movements founded in the early 20th century are the Universal Negro Improvement Association and the National Association for the Advancement of Colored People. The Nation of Islam, a notable quasi-Islamic religious movement, also began in the early 1930s.

=== African-American cultural movement ===
The Black Power movement of the 1960s and 1970s followed in the wake of the non-violent Civil Rights Movement. The movement promoted racial pride and ethnic cohesion in contrast to the focus on integration of the Civil Rights Movement, and adopted a more militant posture in the face of racism. It also inspired a new renaissance in African-American literary and artistic expression generally referred to as the African-American or "Black Arts Movement".

The works of popular recording artists such as Nina Simone ("Young, Gifted and Black") and The Impressions ("Keep On Pushing"), as well as the poetry, fine arts, and literature of the time, shaped and reflected the growing racial and political consciousness. Among the most prominent writers of the African-American Arts Movement were poet Nikki Giovanni; poet and publisher Don L. Lee, who later became known as Haki Madhubuti; poet and playwright Leroi Jones, later known as Amiri Baraka; and Sonia Sanchez.

During the African American cultural Movement, Melvin Charles and Gleason T Jackson created the Black American Heritage Flag (also known as the African American Heritage Flag) in 1967 for Black Americans. It is used today as an ethnic flag that represents the African American people.

Another major aspect of the African-American Arts Movement was the infusion of the African aesthetic, a return to a collective cultural sensibility and ethnic pride that was much in evidence during the Harlem Renaissance and in the celebration of Négritude among the artistic and literary circles in the US, Caribbean, and the African continent nearly four decades earlier: the idea that "black is beautiful". During this time, there was a resurgence of interest in elements of African culture within African-American culture that had been suppressed or devalued to conform to Eurocentric America. Natural hairstyles, such as the afro, and African clothing, such as the dashiki, gained popularity. More importantly, the African-American aesthetic encouraged personal pride and political awareness among African Americans.

== Arts ==
=== Music ===
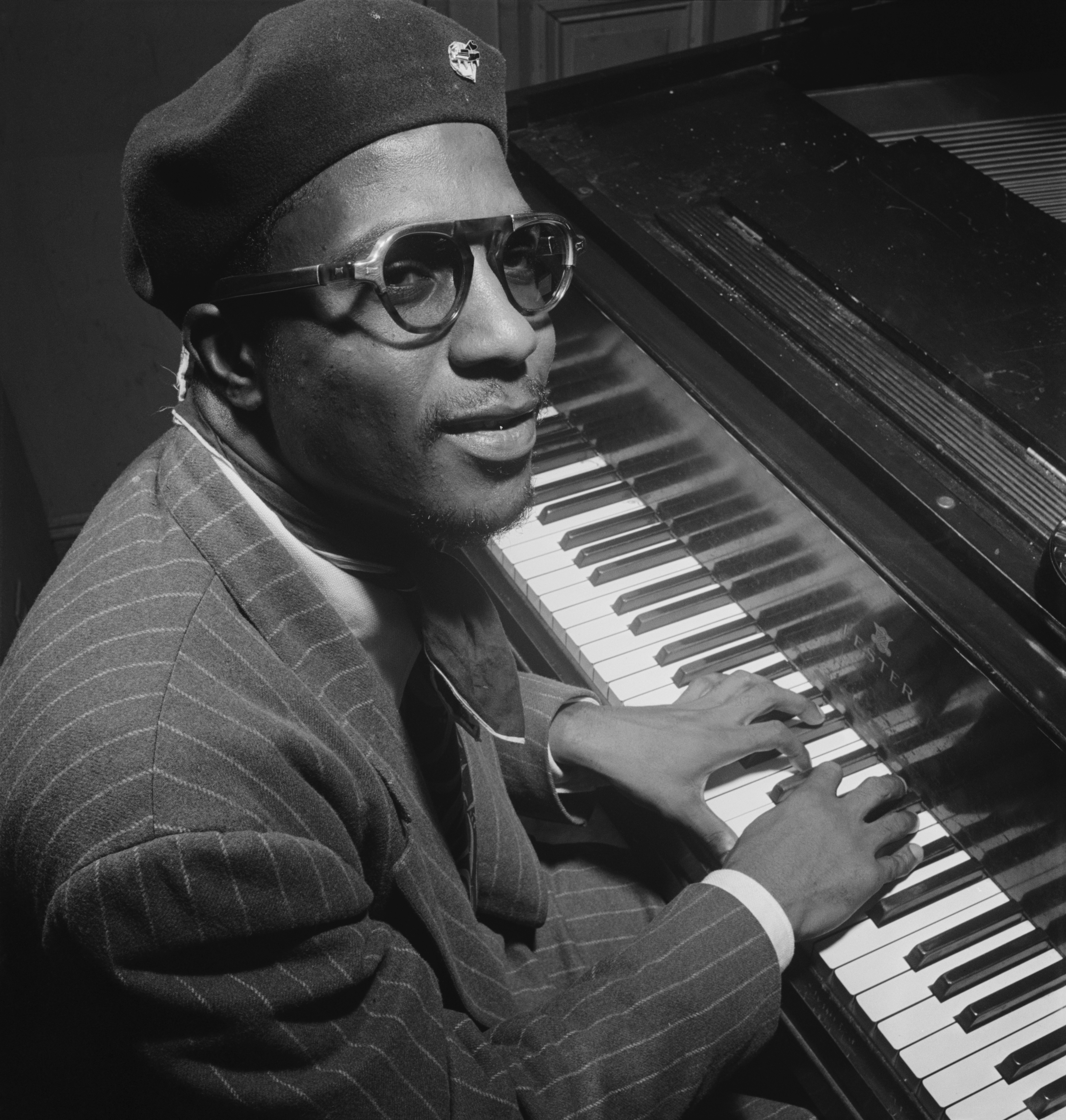
Jazz pianist Thelonious Monk in 1947

Music in African-American culture extends far beyond the realms of performance and consumption; it is deeply rooted in community participation and interaction. The act of music-making—actively engaging with music in various forms—includes singing together in churches, participating in call-and-response patterns, dancing, and even informal music-making in social settings. In African-American churches, gospel music serves as a form of worship and a collective spiritual experience. Congregants engage fully in music-making, responding to the choir with shouts of affirmation, clapping, and even dancing.

The tradition of call-and-response, which originated in African and African-American spirituals, is a key feature in many genres, including gospel, jazz, and hip-hop. The dynamic interaction between performer and audience blurs the line between the two and invites the entire community to participate. In jazz, for instance, improvisation between musicians can be viewed as a form of music-making where the performers engage in a musical dialogue that often involves audience feedback and interaction. Similarly, early hip-hop culture emphasized the participatory nature of music-making, with community members engaging through freestyle rap battles, breakdancing, and DJing. These music-making practices emphasize the active role of music as a social connector, shape cultural identity, and foster communal bonds.

African-American music is rooted in the typically polyrhythmic music of the ethnic groups of Africa, specifically those in the Western, Sahelean, and Central and Southern regions. African oral traditions, nurtured in slavery, encouraged the use of music to pass on history, teach lessons, ease suffering, and relay messages. The African pedigree of African-American music is evident in some common elements: call and response, syncopation, percussion, improvisation, swung notes, blue notes, the use of falsetto, melisma, and complex multi-part harmony. During slavery, Africans in America blended traditional European hymns with African elements to create spirituals. The banjo was the first African derived instrument to be played and built in the United States. Slaveholders discovered African-American slaves used drums to communicate.

As far back as the 1700s, after drums were outlawed after the Stono Rebellion in South Carolina, African Americans created hamboning, patting their bodies in order to make their music.

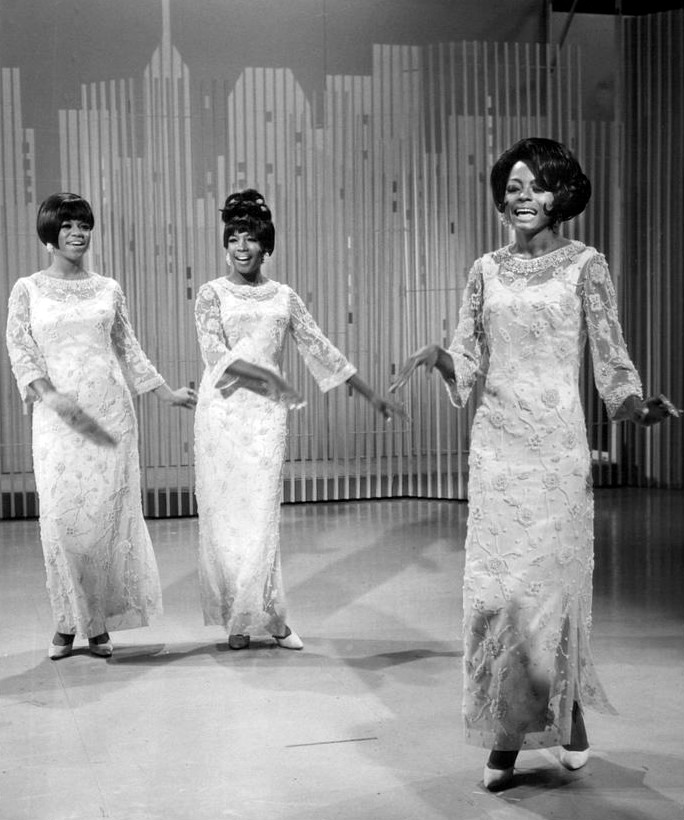
Vocal group the Supremes in 1966

Many African Americans sing "Lift Every Voice and Sing" in addition to the American national anthem, "The Star-Spangled Banner", or in lieu of it. Written by James Weldon Johnson and John Rosamond Johnson in 1900 to be performed for the birthday of Abraham Lincoln, the song was, and continues to be, a popular way for African Americans to recall past struggles and express ethnic solidarity, faith, and hope for the future. The song was adopted as the "Negro National Anthem" by the NAACP in 1919. Many African-American children are taught the song at school, church or by their families. "Lift Ev'ry Voice and Sing" traditionally is sung immediately following, or instead of, "The Star-Spangled Banner" at events hosted by African-American churches, schools, and other organizations.

In the 19th century, as the result of the blackface minstrel show, African-American music entered mainstream American society. By the early 20th century, several musical forms with origins in the African-American community had transformed American popular music. Aided by the technological innovations of radio and phonograph records, ragtime, jazz, blues, and swing also became popular overseas, and the 1920s became known as the Jazz Age. The early 20th century also saw the creation of the first African-American Broadway shows, films such as King Vidor's Hallelujah!, and operas such as George Gershwin's Porgy and Bess.

==== Contemporary ====
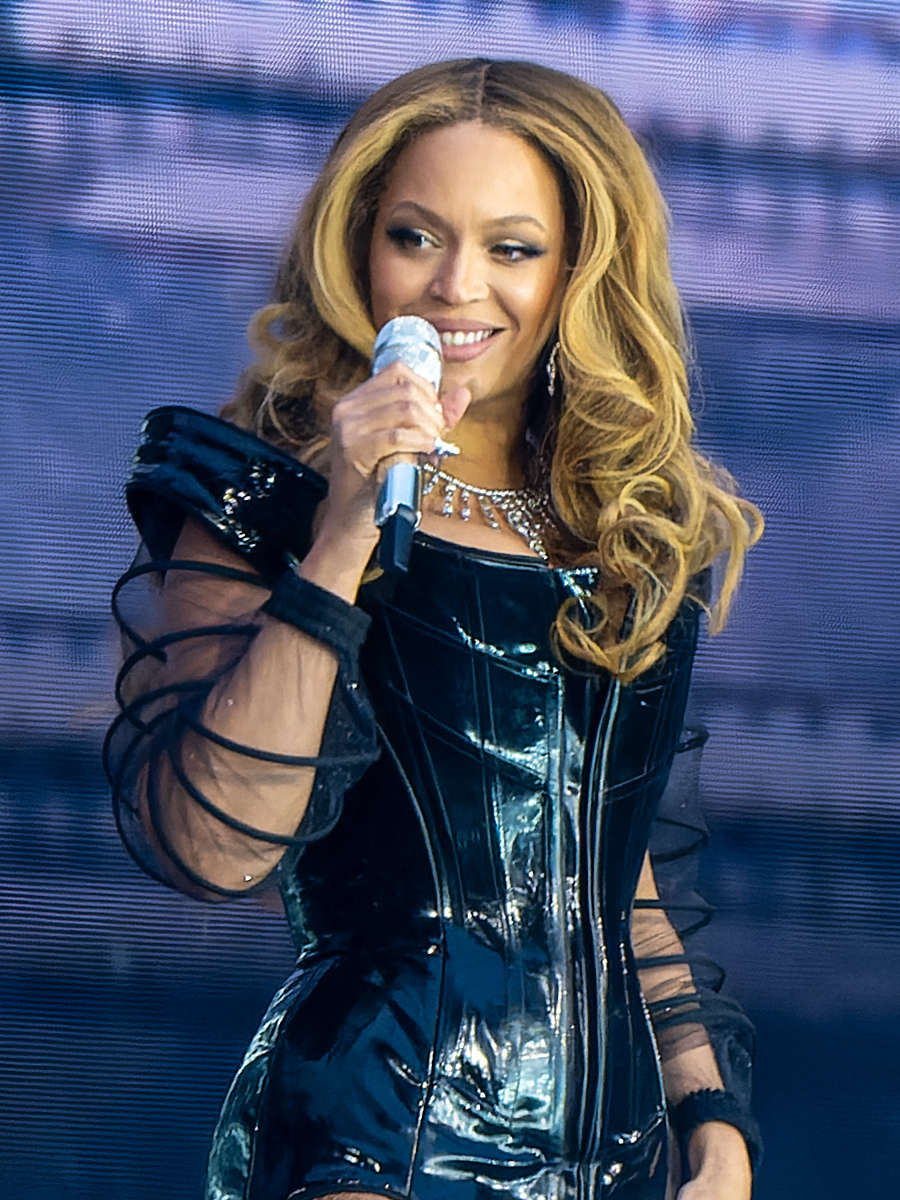
Vocalist Beyoncé

The African-American Cultural Movement of the 1960s and 1970s fueled the growth of funk, soul, disco, and later hip hop forms with sub-genres of hip hop to include; rap, hip house, new jack swing, and go-go. House music was created in black communities in Chicago in the 1980s. Hip hop and contemporary R&B would become a multicultural movement, however, it still remained important to many African Americans.

In the 21st century, African-American music has achieved unprecedented levels of mainstream acceptance and influence in American popular music. This is evident from its dominant performance on the Billboard charts, where genres such as hip-hop and R&B, deeply rooted in African-American culture, have surpassed pop in terms of streaming and sales. The impact of African-American artists on contemporary music, fashion, and cultural trends is significant, with figures like Beyoncé, Kendrick Lamar, and Drake shaping the industry and reflecting its broad appeal across diverse audiences.

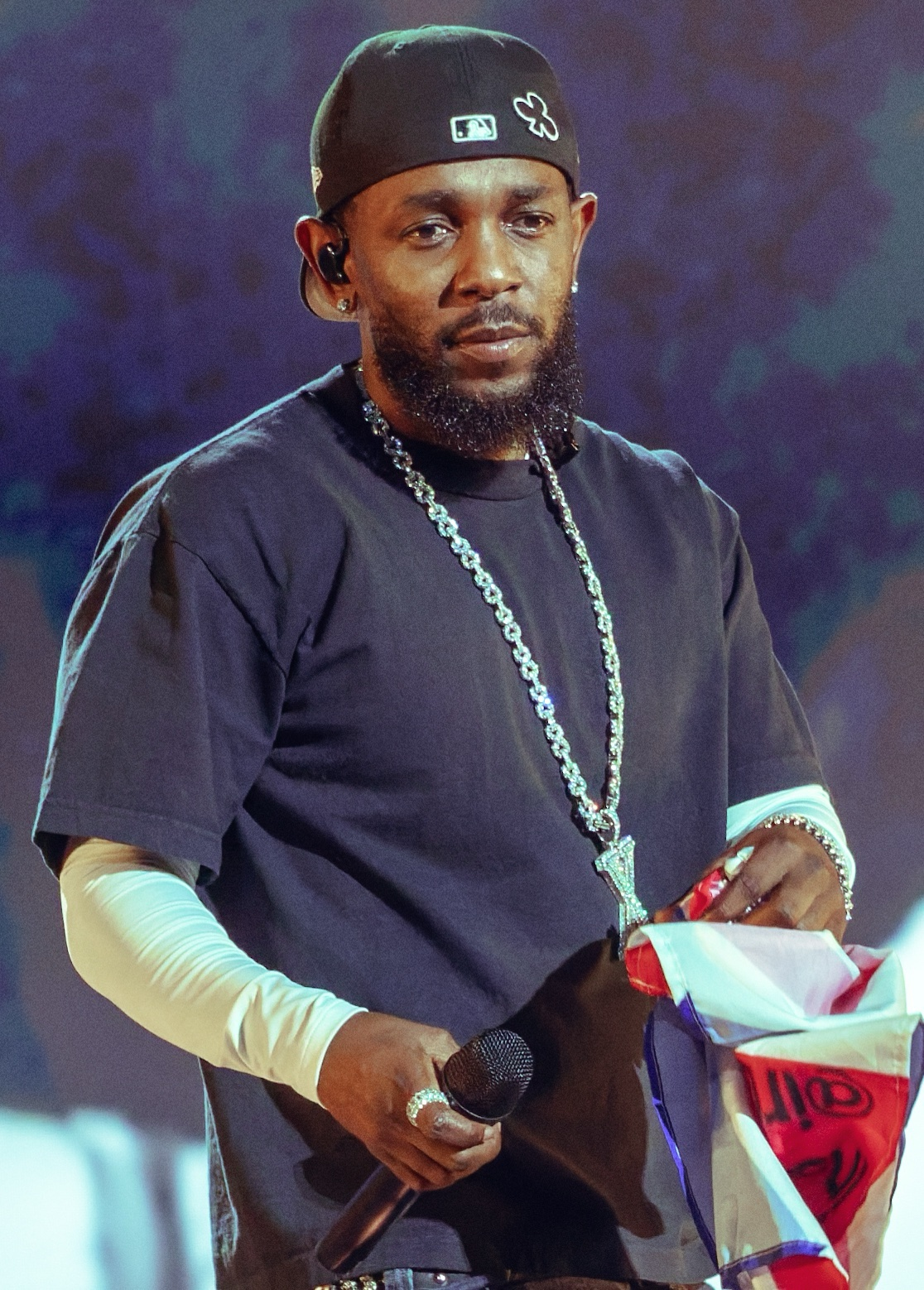
Rapper Kendrick Lamar

Furthermore, the integration of African-American musical styles into mainstream media has been highlighted by high-profile collaborations and genre-blending successes, such as Lil Nas X’s "Old Town Road," which achieved historic chart success by merging hip-hop with country music. Streaming platforms like Spotify and Apple Music also show the substantial engagement and commercial success of African-American music across various demographics.

In addition to continuing to develop newer musical forms, modern artists have also started a rebirth of older genres in the form of genres such as neo soul and modern funk-inspired groups.

As of November 2018, the leading music genre listened to by African Americans is Rhythm and Blues (62%), followed by Hip Hop (39%), Gospel (26%), Rap (21%), Soul/Funk (19%), and Jazz (18%).

=== Dance ===
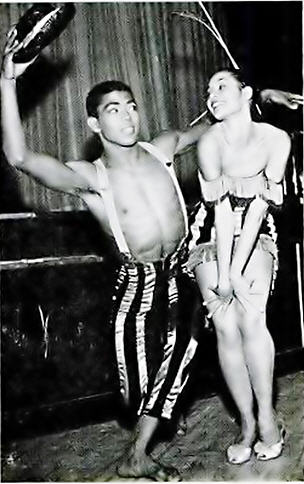
Alvin Ailey and Carmen de Lavallade (1954)

African-American dance, like other aspects of African-American culture, finds its earliest roots in the dances of the hundreds of African ethnic groups that made up the enslaved African population in the Americas as well as in traditional folk dances from Europe. Dance in the African tradition, and thus in the tradition of slaves, was a part of both everyday life and special occasions. Many of these traditions such as get down, ring shouts, Akan Line Dancing and other elements of African body language survive as elements of modern dance.

In the 19th century, African-American dance began to appear in minstrel shows. These shows often presented African Americans as caricatures for ridicule to large audiences. The first African-American dance to become popular with white dancers was the cakewalk in 1891. Later dances to follow in this tradition include the Charleston, the Lindy Hop, the Jitterbug and the swing.

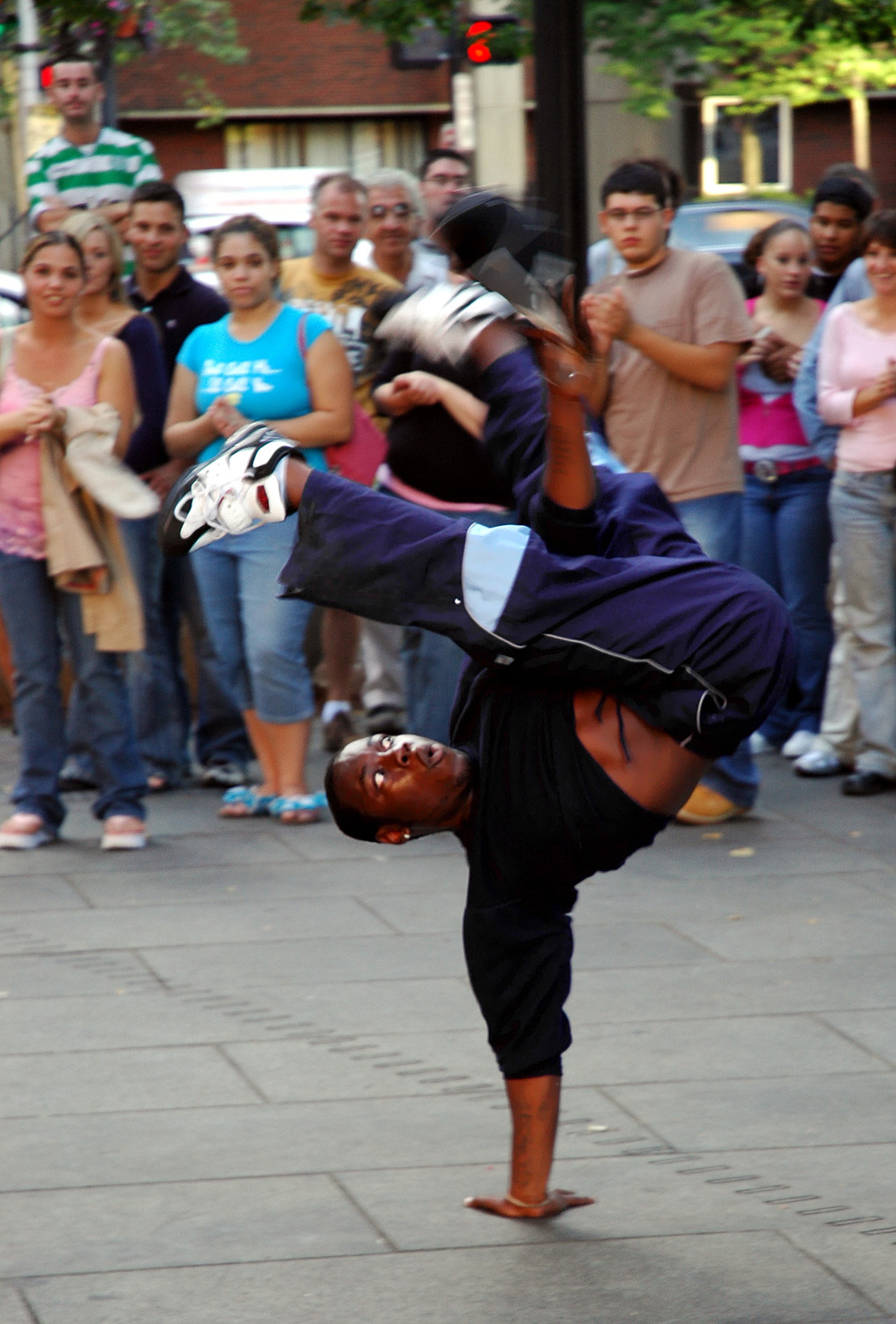
An African-American man breakdancing

During the Harlem Renaissance, African-American Broadway shows such as Shuffle Along helped to establish and legitimize African-American dancers. African-American dance forms such as tap, a combination of African and European influences, gained widespread popularity thanks to dancers such as Bill Robinson and were used by leading white choreographers, who often hired African-American dancers.

Contemporary African-American dance is descended from these earlier forms and also draws influence from African and Caribbean dance forms. Groups such as the Alvin Ailey American Dance Theater have continued to contribute to the growth of this form. Modern popular dance in America is also greatly influenced by African-American dance. American popular dance has also drawn many influences from African-American dance most notably in the hip-hop genre.

Turfing emerged from social and political movements in the East Bay of the San Francisco Bay Area. It is a 'hood' dance and has been interpreted as a response to the loss of African-American lives, police brutality, and race relations in Oakland, California and as an expression of Blackness that integrates concepts of solidarity, social support and peace.

Twerking is an African-American dance similar to dances from Africa in Côte d'Ivoire, Senegal, Somalia and the Congo.

=== Visual Art ===
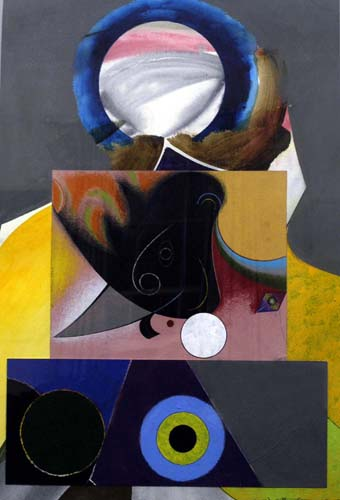
Midnight Golfer by Eugene J. Martin, mixed-media collage on rag paper (1990)

From its early origins in slave communities, through the end of the 20th century, African-American art has made a vital contribution to the art of the United States. During the period between the 17th century and the early 19th century, art took the form of small drums, quilts, wrought-iron figures, and ceramic vessels in the southern United States. These artifacts have similarities with comparable crafts in West and Central Africa. In contrast, African-American artisans like the New England–based engraver Scipio Moorhead and the Baltimore portrait painter Joshua Johnson created art that was conceived in a thoroughly western European fashion.

During the 19th century, Harriet Powers made quilts in rural Georgia, United States that are now considered among the finest examples of 19th-century Southern quilting. Later in the 20th century, the women of Gee's Bend developed a distinctive, bold, and sophisticated quilting style based on traditional African-American quilts with a geometric simplicity that developed separately but was like that of Amish quilts and modern art.

After the American Civil War, museums and galleries began more frequently to display the work of African-American artists. Cultural expression in mainstream venues was still limited by the dominant European aesthetic and by racial prejudice. To increase the visibility of their work, many African-American artists traveled to Europe where they had greater freedom. It was not until the Harlem Renaissance that more European Americans began to pay attention to African-American art in America.

During the 1920s, artists such as Richmond Barthé, Aaron Douglas, Augusta Savage, and photographer James Van Der Zee became well known for their work. During the Great Depression, new opportunities arose for these and other African-American artists under the WPA. In later years, other programs and institutions, such as the New York City-based Harmon Foundation, helped to foster African-American artistic talent. Augusta Savage, Elizabeth Catlett, Lois Mailou Jones, Romare Bearden, Jacob Lawrence, and others exhibited in museums and juried art shows, and built reputations and followings for themselves.

Untitled (Skull) by Jean-Michel Basquiat (1981)

In the 1950s and 1960s, there were very few widely accepted African-American artists. Despite this, The Highwaymen, a loose association of 27 African-American artists from Ft. Pierce, Florida, created idyllic, quickly realized images of the Florida landscape and peddled some 50,000 of them from the trunks of their cars. They sold their art directly to the public rather than through galleries and art agents, thus receiving the name "The Highwaymen". Rediscovered in the mid-1990s, today they are recognized as an important part of American folk history. Their artwork is widely collected by enthusiasts and original pieces can easily fetch thousands of dollars in auctions and sales.

The Black Arts Movement of the 1960s and 1970s was another period of resurgent interest in African-American art. During this period, several African-American artists gained national prominence, among them Lou Stovall, Ed Love, Charles White, and Jeff Donaldson. Donaldson and a group of African-American artists formed the Afrocentric collective AfriCOBRA, which remains in existence today. The sculptor Martin Puryear, whose work has been acclaimed for years, was being honored with a 30-year retrospective of his work at the Museum of Modern Art in New York in November 2007. Notable contemporary African-American artists include Willie Cole, David Hammons, Eugene J. Martin, Mose Tolliver, Reynold Ruffins, the late William Tolliver, and Kara Walker.

=== Ceramics ===
In Charleston, South Carolina, thirteen colonoware from the 18th century were found with folded strip roulette decorations. From the time of colonial America until the 19th century in the United States, African-Americans and their enslaved African ancestors, as well as Native Americans who were enslaved and not enslaved, were creating colonoware of this pottery style. Roulette decorated pottery likely originated in West Africa and in the northern region of Central Africa amid 2000 BCE. The longstanding pottery tradition, from which for the Charleston colonoware derives, likely began its initial development between 800 BCE and 400 BCE in Mali; thereafter, the pottery tradition expanded around 900 CE into the Lake Chad basin, into the southeastern region of Mauritania by 1200 CE, and, by the 19th century CE, expanded southward. More specifically, the pottery style for the Charleston colonoware may have been created by 18th century peoples (e.g., Kanuri people, Hausa people in Kano) of the Kanem–Bornu Empire. Within a broader context, following the 17th century enslavement of western Africans for the farming of rice in South Carolina, the Charleston colonoware may be understood as Africanisms from West/Central Africa, which endured the Middle Passage, and became transplanted into the local culture of colonial-era Lowcountry, South Carolina.

Symbolisms from Africa may have served as identity markers for enslaved African-American creators of stoneware. For example, David Drake's signature marks (e.g., an "X", a slash) and well as Landrum crosses, which were developed by enslaved African Americans and appear similar to Kongo cosmograms, are such examples from Edgefield County, South Carolina.

=== Literature ===
African-American literature has its roots in the oral traditions of African slaves in America. The slaves used stories and fables in much the same way as they used music. These stories influenced the earliest African-American writers and poets in the 18th century such as Phillis Wheatley and Olaudah Equiano. These authors reached early high points by telling slave narratives.

During the early 20th century Harlem Renaissance, numerous authors and poets, such as Langston Hughes, W. E. B. Du Bois, and Booker T. Washington, grappled with how to respond to discrimination in America. Authors during the Civil Rights Movement, such as Richard Wright, James Baldwin, and Gwendolyn Brooks wrote about issues of racial segregation, oppression, and other aspects of African-American life. This tradition continues today with authors who have been accepted as an integral part of American literature, with works such as Roots: The Saga of an American Family by Alex Haley, The Color Purple by Alice Walker, Beloved by Nobel Prize-winning Toni Morrison, and fiction works by Octavia Butler and Walter Mosley. Such works have achieved both best-selling and/or award-winning status.

=== Cinema ===
African-American films typically feature an African-American cast and are targeted at an African-American audience. More recently, Black films feature multicultural casts, and are aimed at multicultural audiences, even if American Blackness is essential to the storyline.

== Sports and recreation ==
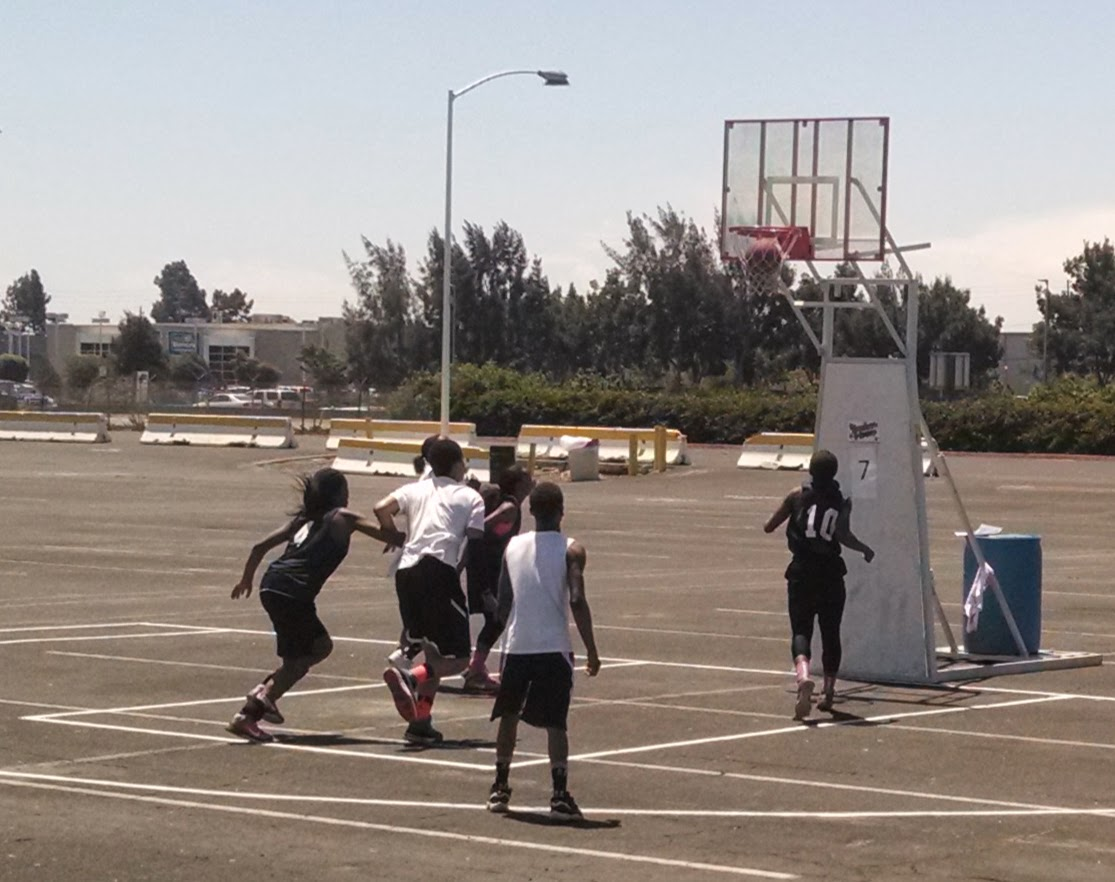
Children's streetball in Oakland

Baseball used to be a major sport among African Americans; however, basketball (particularly streetball) has replaced it to a substantial extent in recent decades.

Black athletes have achieved disproportionate success in some sports, and at the professional level, they constitute the majority of NFL and NBA athletes.

African Americans played a significant role in desegregating American society through sports. For example, baseball was segregated in the aftermath of the Civil War until Jackie Robinson broke the MLB color line in 1947. In modern times, sports have been pursued by the poorer sections of the community as a way out of economic struggle.

=== Games ===
Card games such as bid whist, spades, tonk, pitty-pat, and rummy are traditionally enjoyed by African Americans at familial gatherings. "Talkin' the board", or illegally providing one's partner with hidden information, is not allowed in any game.

Hand games that trickled from Africa are also prominent in Black American culture. Double This, Double That, Mama Mama Can't You See, Slide Baby, Miss Mary Mack, Down, Down Baby, Rockin' Robin (Tweet), Down by the Banks of the Hanky Panky, and Shame, Shame, Shame are kinesthetic games enjoyed predominantly by young Black girls.

== Museums ==
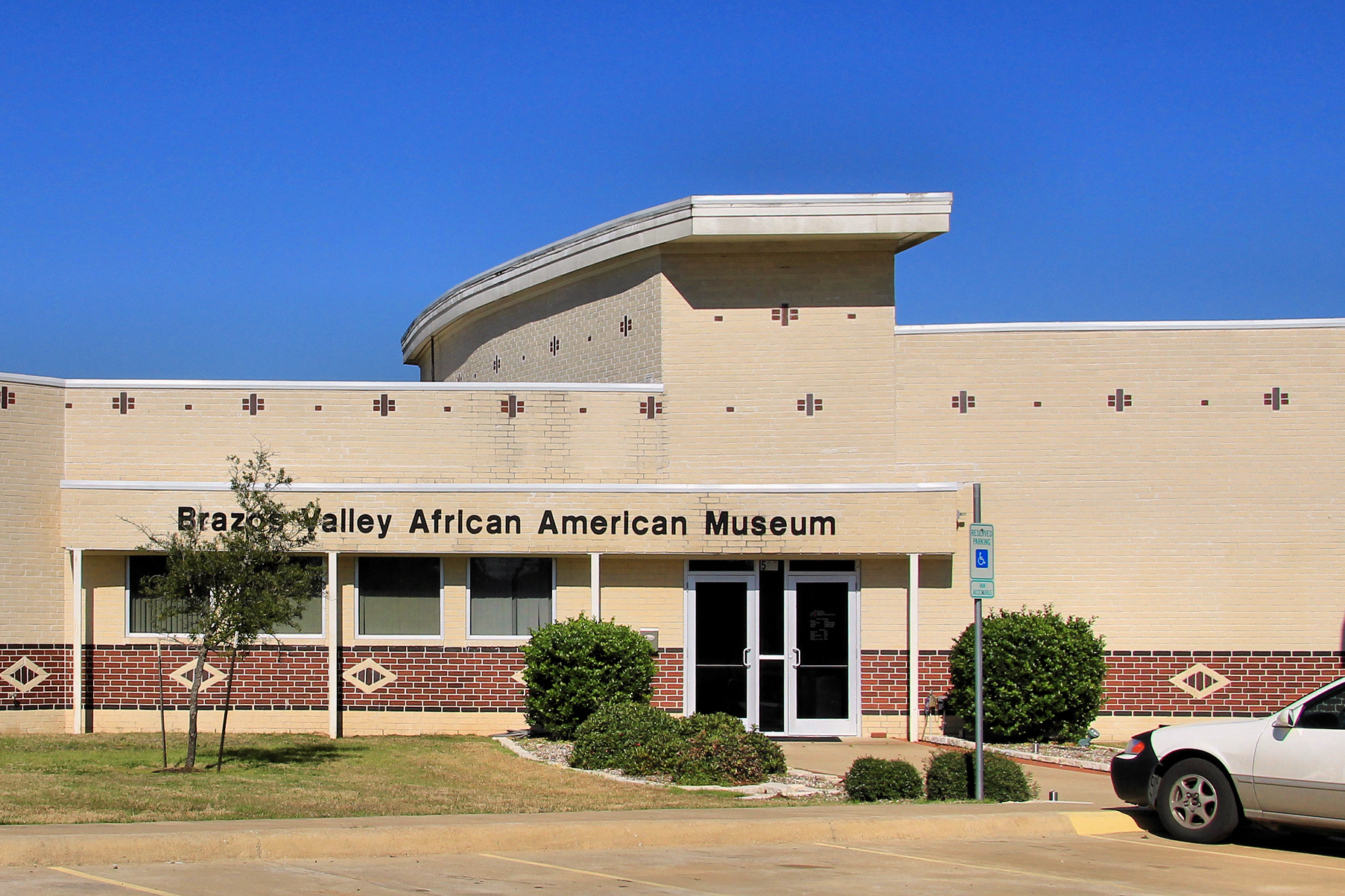
The Brazos Valley African American museum in Texas

The African American Museum Movement emerged during the 1950s and 1960s to preserve the heritage of the African-American experience and to ensure its proper interpretation in American history. Museums devoted to African-American history are found in many African-American neighborhoods. Institutions such as the African American Museum and Library at Oakland, The African American Museum in Cleveland and the Natchez Museum of African American History and Culture were created by African Americans to teach and investigate cultural history that, until recent decades, was primarily preserved through oral traditions.

Other prominent African-American museums include Chicago's DuSable Museum of African American History, and the National Museum of African American History and Culture, established in 2003 as part of the Smithsonian Institution in Washington, D.C.

== Language ==
The history of the involuntary manner in which African Americans arrived in the United States, coupled with 100 years of forced segregation from the dominant culture allowed for a protracted period where language was being formed and shaped outside the traditional patterns. Most enslaved Africans brought to the Americas came from the West African coast. The languages of this region, such as those from the Niger-Congo family, had a significant influence. Some specific examples include the Wolof, Yoruba, Igbo and Mandé languages. There was also a large contingent from Central Africa, especially from regions where Bantu languages were spoken, such as Kongo (Kikongo), Mbundu and Swahili.

The native speakers of these and other languages were forced to quickly find a way to agree upon new words and phrases as a matter of survival, while also learning and integrating various dialects of American English which varied by region. Over time a divergent form of English emerged. Over the 246 years of chattel slavery in the southern US and societal segregation in the northern states, varied forms of English took root within the African American culture. An additional century of forced segregation and Jim Crow between 1865 and 1965 extended the period when African Americans, still not fully immersed in the broader society, did not experience the traditional process of adopting the dominant society's language.

Generations of hardships created by the compounded institutions of slavery imposed upon the African-American community prevented the majority of them from learning to read or write English, despite this, enslaved Africans continued to carry their language systems and culture, creating distinct language patterns. Filtering the English they heard through their language systems and culture.

While traditionally understood to be generally factual that European owners of enslaved Africans often intentionally mixed Africans who spoke different languages to discourage communication in any language other than English, the truth is that Africans were strategically placed in certain types of settings. West Africans were primarily (not exclusively) placed in non-field work in the upper southern colonies and West Central/Central Africans were primarily (not exclusively) placed in field based work in the lower southern colonies.

Africans in primarily non-field work typically had extensive interaction with Europeans in the early period, with cultural influence being bi-directional. Colonies typically preferred certain African ethnic groups, some very selective (South Carolina for example), others a bit more loose but still maintained a level of preference (Virginia for example). West Central and Central Africans brought with them a homogenous culture that superseded West African culture early on in establishing African-American culture, at a later point in history, West African influence displays itself in African-American culture.

Interaction between West Africans and West Central/Central Africans did occur, creating a lingua franca, however the culture of African Americans was heavily affected by the homogeneity and relatively isolated Bantu imported population. Later influence from West Africa presents itself in African-American culture. African-American speech however is heavily based (but not exclusively, includes West Africa to some extent) in Bantu culture, as such, it is responsible for African Americans' language patterns, combining an African substrate with the topical usage of primarily non-African words.

African-American Vernacular English (AAVE) is touted to be a variety (dialect, ethnolect, and sociolect) of the American English language; however, mainstream non-AAL/V linguists have traditionally and intentionally ignored or dismissed African language systems and culture, missing key associations and connections. AAVE has its roots in the historical experiences of African Americans and plays a crucial role in cultural identity and expression. It has also significantly influenced mainstream American English, particularly through music, literature, and media. Linguists and speakers of AAL (African American Language) have shown that the grammatical structure of AAL is Niger-Congo and that the cultural/relational patterns within the language that are of African origin characterize or color it.

While AAVE is academically considered a legitimate dialect because of its logical structure, some of both whites and African Americans consider it slang or the result of a poor command of Standard American English, none of which is true; they are differences in languages. Many African Americans who were born outside the American South still speak with hints of AAVE or southern dialect. Inner-city African-American children who are isolated by speaking only AAVE sometimes have more difficulty with standardized testing and, after school, moving to the mainstream world for work. It is common for many speakers of AAVE to code switch between AAVE and Standard American English depending on the setting.

== Fashion and aesthetics ==
=== Attire ===
The Black Arts Movement, a cultural explosion of the 1960s, saw the incorporation of surviving cultural dress with elements from modern fashion and West African traditional clothing to create a uniquely African-American traditional style. Kente cloth is the best known African textile. These colorful woven patterns, which exist in numerous varieties, were originally made by the Asante and Ewe peoples of Ghana and Togo. Kente fabric also appears in a number of Western style fashions ranging from casual T-shirts to formal bow ties and cummerbunds. Kente strips are often sewn into liturgical and academic robes or worn as stoles. Since the Black Arts Movement, traditional African clothing has been popular amongst African Americans for both formal and informal occasions. Other manifestations of traditional African dress in common evidence in African-American culture are vibrant colors, Bògòlanfini, trade beads and the use of Adinkra motifs in jewelry and in couture and decorator fabrics.

Another common aspect of fashion in African-American culture involves the appropriate dress for worship in the Black church. It is expected in most churches that an individual present their best appearance for worship. African-American women in particular are known for wearing vibrant dresses and suits. An interpretation of a passage from the Christian Bible, "every woman who prays or prophesies with her head uncovered dishonors her head", has led to the tradition of wearing elaborate Sunday hats, sometimes known as "crowns".

Hip hop fashion is popular with African Americans. Grillz were made popular by African-American rapper Nelly. Sagging pants was a part of African-American culture. Air Jordan, a shoe brand named after former African-American basketball player Michael Jordan, is very popular among the African-American community.

African-American fashion designers include Ann Lowe, Christopher John Rogers, Virgil Abloh and Kanye West.

=== Hair ===
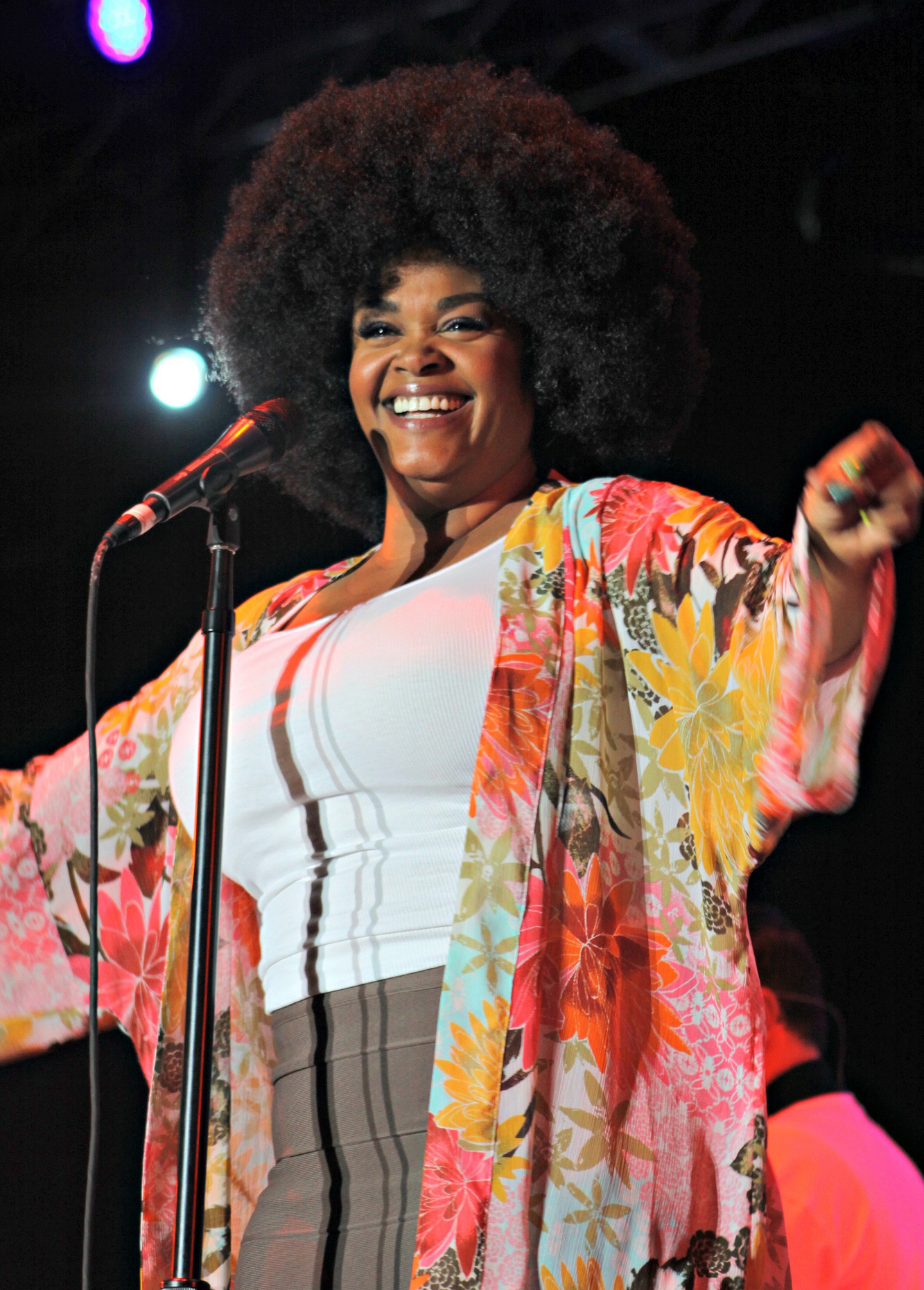
Singer Jill Scott wearing an afro in 2012.

Hair styling in African-American culture is greatly varied. African-American hair is typically composed of coiled curls, which range from tight to wavy. Many women choose to wear their hair in its natural state. Natural hair can be styled in a variety of ways, including the afro, twist outs, braid outs, and wash and go styles. It is a myth that natural hair presents styling problems or is hard to manage; this myth seems prevalent because mainstream culture has, for decades, attempted to get African-American women to conform to its standard of beauty (i.e., straight hair). To that end, some women prefer straightening of the hair through the application of heat or chemical processes. Although this can be a matter of personal preference, the choice is often affected by straight hair being a beauty standard in the West and the fact that hair type can affect employment. However, more and more women are wearing their hair in its natural state and receiving positive feedback. Alternatively, the predominant and most socially acceptable practice for men is to leave one's hair natural.

Often, as men age and begin to lose their hair, the hair is either closely cropped, or the head is shaved completely free of hair. However, since the 1960s, natural hairstyles, such as the afro, braids, waves, fades, and dreadlocks, have been growing in popularity. Despite their association with radical political movements and their vast difference from mainstream Western hairstyles, the styles have attained considerable, but certainly limited, social acceptance.

Maintaining facial hair is more prevalent among African-American men than in other male populations in the US. In fact, the soul patch is so named because African-American men, particularly jazz musicians, popularized the style. The preference for facial hair among African-American men is due partly to personal taste, but also because they are more prone than other ethnic groups to develop a condition known as pseudofolliculitis barbae, commonly referred to as razor bumps, many prefer not to shave.

=== Body image ===
Eurocentric beauty standards have widely shaped image. In an effort to unlearn these sentiments rooted in colonialism and white supremacy, a movement has ensued that promotes natural Black beauty. This includes efforts toward promoting models with clearly defined African features; the mainstreaming of natural hairstyles; and, in women, fuller, more voluptuous body types. Non-Black Americans have sometimes appropriated different hair braiding techniques and other forms of African-American hair.

=== Beauty ===
Some African Americans use shea butter to moisture their skin and hair.

== Religion and spirituality ==
While African Americans practice a number of religions, Black Protestant is by far the most prevalent (59%), followed by Evangelical Protestant (15%).

=== Christianity ===
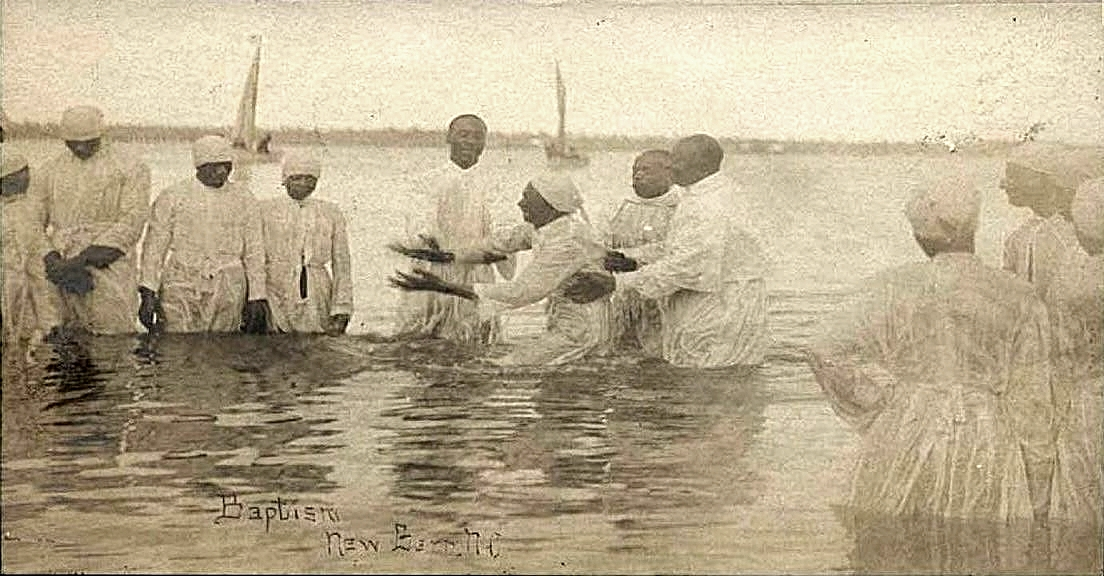
A river baptism in New Bern, North Carolina, near the turn of the 20th century

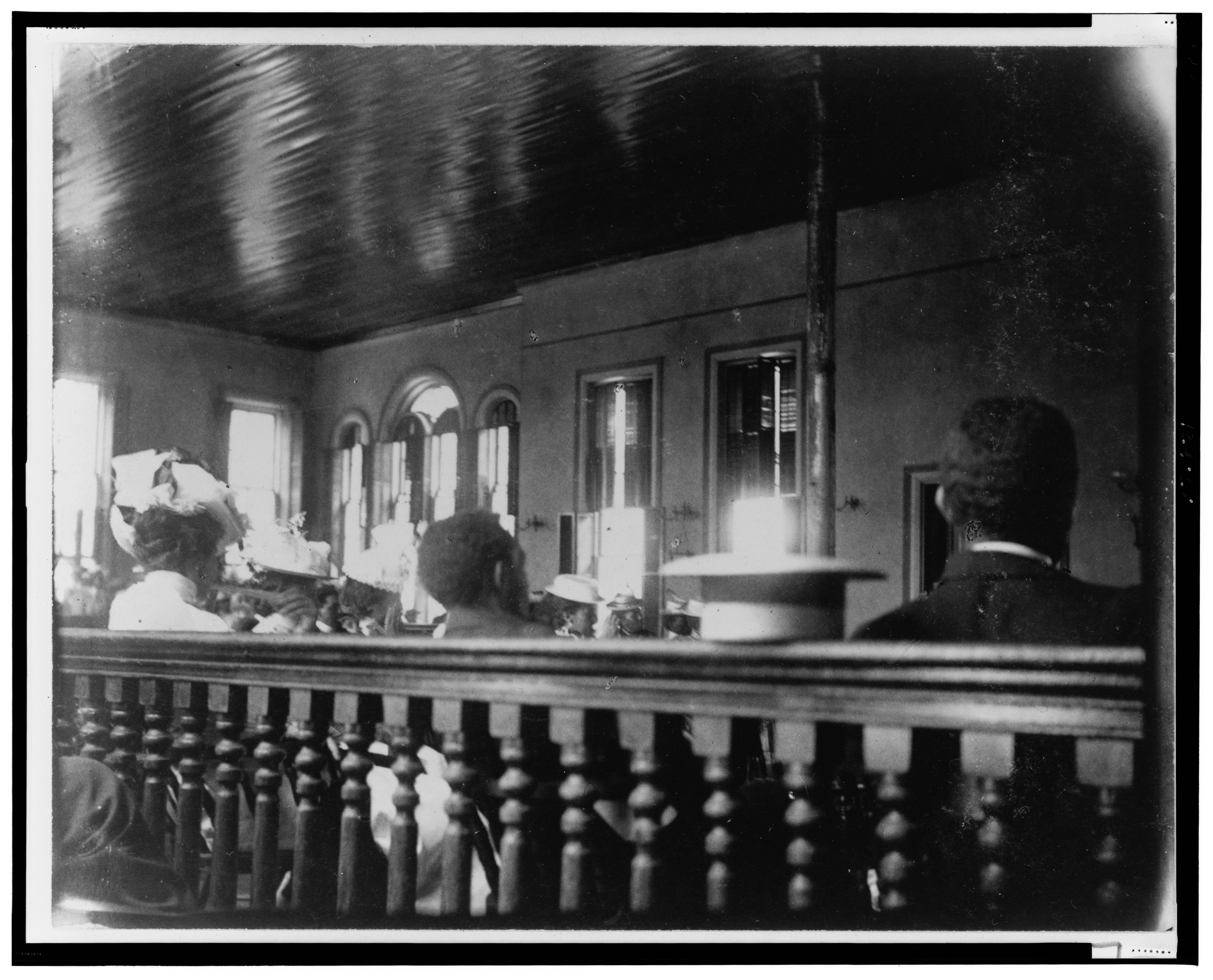
African Americans in church in Georgia, 1900

The religious institutions of African-American Christians are commonly and collectively referred to as the black church. During the era of slavery, many slaves were stripped of their African belief systems and typically denied free religious practice, some forced to become Christians while others brought Christianity from Africa. However, slaves managed to hang on to some of their traditional African religious practices by integrating them into Christian worship during secret meetings. These practices, including dance, shouts, African rhythms, and enthusiastic singing, remain a large part of worship in the African-American church.

African-American churches taught the belief that all people were equal in God's eyes, and they also believed that the doctrine of obedience to one's master which was taught in white churches was hypocritical—yet they accepted and propagated internal hierarchies and supported the corporal punishment of children among other things. Slave and master teachings were taught out of context by slave masters through the use of a Slave Bible where slave holders would remove pages and whole books of biblical scriptures, such as Exodus and others, that were heavily against ill-treatment of slaves or laborers, against kidnapping and selling of people, and that they felt could cause a rebellion. Instead, the African-American church focused on the message of equality and hopes for a better future. Before and after emancipation, racial segregation in America prompted the development of organized African-American denominations. The first of these was the AME Church founded by Richard Allen in 1787.

After the Civil War, the merger of three smaller Baptist groups formed the National Baptist Convention. This organization is the largest African-American Christian Denomination and it is also the second-largest Baptist denomination in the United States. An African-American church is not necessarily a separate denomination. Several predominantly African-American churches exist as members of predominantly white denominations. African-American churches have served to provide African-American people with leadership positions and opportunities to organize that were denied to them by mainstream American society. Because of this, African-American pastors became the bridge between the African-American and European American communities, a leadership position which enabled them to play a crucial role during the Civil Rights Movement.

Like many Christians, African-American Christians sometimes participate in or attend a Christmas play. Black Nativity by Langston Hughes is a re-telling of the classic Nativity story with gospel music. Productions can be found in African-American theaters and churches all over the country.

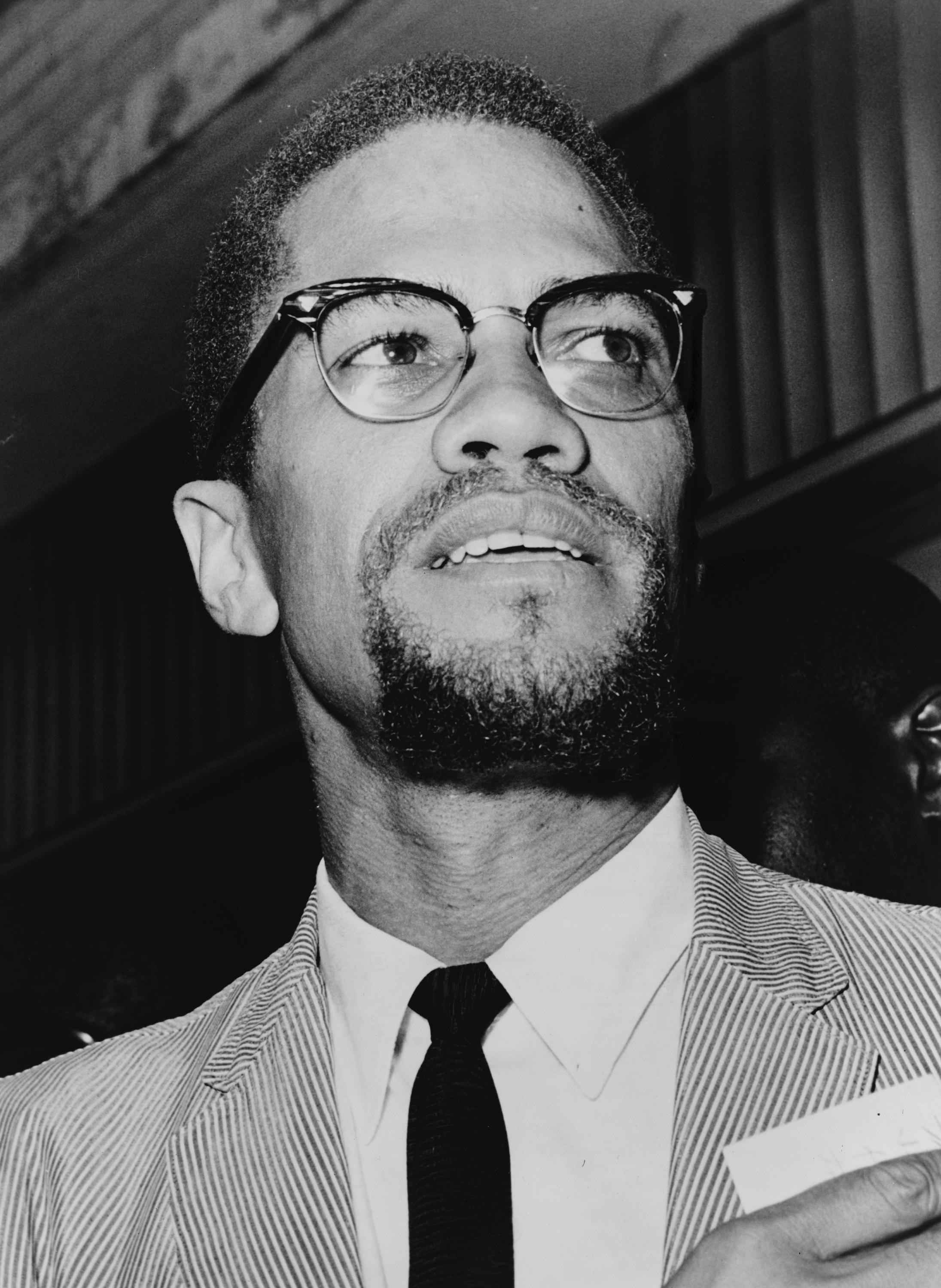
Malcolm X, a notable African-American Muslim, became a member of the Nation of Islam but later converted to Sunni Islam.

=== Islam ===
Generations before the advent of the Atlantic slave trade, Islam was a thriving religion in West Africa due to mix of peaceful, violent and discriminative policies like Jizya introduction via the lucrative Trans-Saharan trade between prominent tribes in the southern Sahara and the Arabs and Berbers in North Africa. In his attesting to this fact the West African scholar Cheikh Anta Diop explained: "The primary reason for the success of Islam in Black Africa ... consequently stems from the fact that it was propagated peacefully at first by solitary Arabo-Berber travelers to certain Black kings and notables, who then spread it about them to those under their jurisdiction.". Many first-generation slaves were often able to retain their Muslim identity, their descendants were not. Slaves were either forcibly converted to Christianity as was the case in the Catholic lands or were besieged with gross inconveniences to their religious practice such as in the case of the Protestant American mainland.

Many former members of the Nation of Islam converted to Sunni Islam when Warith Deen Mohammed took control of the organization after his father's death in 1975 and taught its members the traditional form of Islam based on the Qur'an. A survey by the Council on American-Islamic Relations shows that 30% of Sunni Mosque attendees are African Americans. In fact, most African-American Muslims are orthodox Muslims, as only 2% are of the Nation of Islam.

=== Judaism ===
There are 150,000 African Americans in the United States who practice Judaism. Some of these are members of mainstream Jewish groups like the Reform, Conservative, or Orthodox branches of Judaism; others belong to non-mainstream Jewish groups like the Black Hebrew Israelites. The Black Hebrew Israelites are a collection of African-American religious organizations whose practices and beliefs are partially derived from Judaism. Their varied teachings often include the belief that African Americans are descended from the biblical Israelites.

In the last 10 to 15 years, studies have shown that there has been a major increase in the number of African-Americans who identify themselves as being Jewish. Rabbi Capers Funnye, the first cousin of Michelle Obama, says in response to skepticism by some on people being African-American and Jewish at the same time, "I am a Jew, and that breaks through all color and ethnic barriers."

=== African religions ===
There is a small but growing number of African Americans who participate in Afro-diasporic and traditional African religions, such as Voodoo, Santería, Ifá, and the Rastafari movement. Some practitioners are ethnic Black Americans, while many others are immigrants or the descendants of immigrants from the Caribbean and South America, where these are also practiced. Because of religious practices, such as animal sacrifice, which are no longer common among the larger American religions, and racist attitudes, these groups may be negatively viewed and they are sometimes the victims of harassment. It must be stated, however, that since the Supreme Court judgement that was given to the Lukumi Babaluaye church of Florida in 1993, there has been no major legal challenge to their right to function as they see fit.

=== Other religions ===
Aside from Christianity, Islam, and Judaism, there are also African Americans who practice Buddhism and a number of other religions.

=== Spirituality ===
Spirituality is an important aspect of African American culture. Hoodoo is a set of spiritual traditions with multiple aspects that include: Southern cultural practices from the Antebellum Era, rootwork and conjure, ancestor veneration, and rituals. These traditions were created as a means for enslaved Africans in the United States to understand the new world around them, with some elements having origins across various Central and West African ethnic groups. Hoodoo incorporates beliefs from traditional African religions, such as the Kongo religion, as well as Islam, Christianity, and Indigenous American botanical traditions.

=== Irreligious beliefs ===
In a 2008 Pew Forum survey, 12% of African Americans described themselves as being nothing in particular (11%), agnostic (1%), or atheist (<0.5%).

== Life events ==
For most African Americans, the observance of life events follows the pattern of mainstream American culture. While African Americans and whites often lived to themselves for much of American history, both groups generally had the same perspective on American culture. There are some traditions that are unique to African Americans.

Some African Americans have created new rites of passage that are linked to African traditions. Some pre-teen and teenage boys and girls take classes to prepare them for adulthood. These classes tend to focus on spirituality, responsibility, and leadership. Many of these programs are modeled after traditional African ceremonies, with the focus largely on embracing African cultures.

To this day, some African-American couples choose to "jump the broom" as a part of their wedding ceremony. Some sources claim that this practice can be traced back to Ghana. However, other sources argue that the African-American tradition of "jumping the broom" is far more similar to the tradition in England. Although, this tradition largely fell out of favor in the African-American community after the end of slavery, it has experienced a slight resurgence in recent years as some couples seek to reaffirm their African heritage.

Funeral traditions tend to vary based on a number of factors, including religion and location, but there are a number of commonalities. Probably the most important part of death and dying in the African-American culture is the gathering of family and friends. Either in the last days before death or shortly after death, typically any friends and family members that can be reached are notified. This gathering helps to provide spiritual and emotional support, as well as assistance in making decisions and accomplishing everyday tasks.

The spirituality of death is very important in African-American culture. A member of the clergy or members of the religious community, or both, are typically present with the family through the entire process. Death is often viewed as transitory rather than final. Many services are called homegoings or homecomings, instead of funerals, based on the belief that the person is going home to the afterlife; "Returning to God" or the earth. The entire end of life process is generally treated as a celebration of the person's life, deeds and accomplishments—the "good things" rather than a mourning of loss. This is most notably demonstrated in the New Orleans jazz funeral tradition where upbeat music, dancing, and food encourage those gathered to be happy and celebrate the homegoing of a beloved friend.

== Cuisine ==
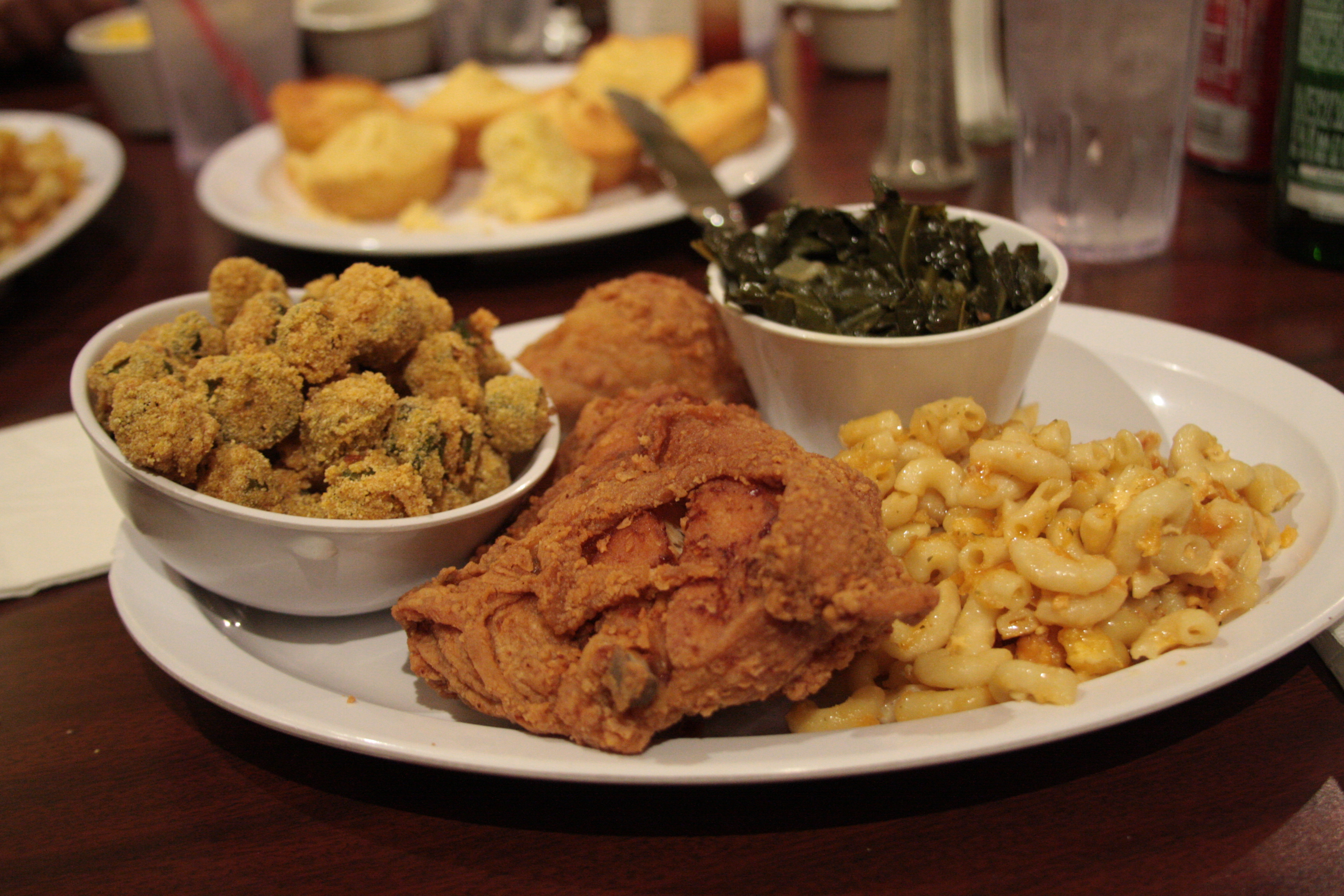
A traditional soul food dinner consisting of fried chicken, macaroni and cheese, collard greens, breaded fried okra, and cornbread.

In studying of the African-American culture, food cannot be left out as one of the media to understand their traditions, religion, interaction, and social and cultural structures of their community. Observing the ways they prepare their food and eat their food ever since the enslaved era reveals about the nature and identity of African-American culture in the United States. Derek Hicks examines the origins of "gumbo", which is considered a soul food to many African Americans, in his reference to the intertwinement of food and culture in the African-American community. No written evidence is found historically about the gumbo or its recipes, so through the African-American nature of orally passing their stories and recipes down, gumbo came to represent their truly communal dish. Gumbo is said to be "an invention of enslaved Africans and African Americans" in Louisiana.

The cultivation and use of many agricultural products in the United States, such as yams, peanuts, rice, okra, sorghum, indigo dyes, and cotton, can be traced to African influences. African-American foods reflect creative responses to racial and economic oppression and poverty. Soul food blends African, European, and Native American influences. Dishes like fried chicken, collard greens, and cornbread are staples that have become integral components of American cuisine. Under slavery, African Americans were not allowed to eat better cuts of meat, and after emancipation many were often too poor to afford them. During slavery, many African Americans would take these sorts of leftover ingredients from their white owners, often less desirable cuts of meats and vegetables, and prepare them into a dish that has consistency between stew and soup. By sharing this food in churches with a gathering of their people, they also shared experience, feelings, attachment, and a sense of unity that brings the community together.

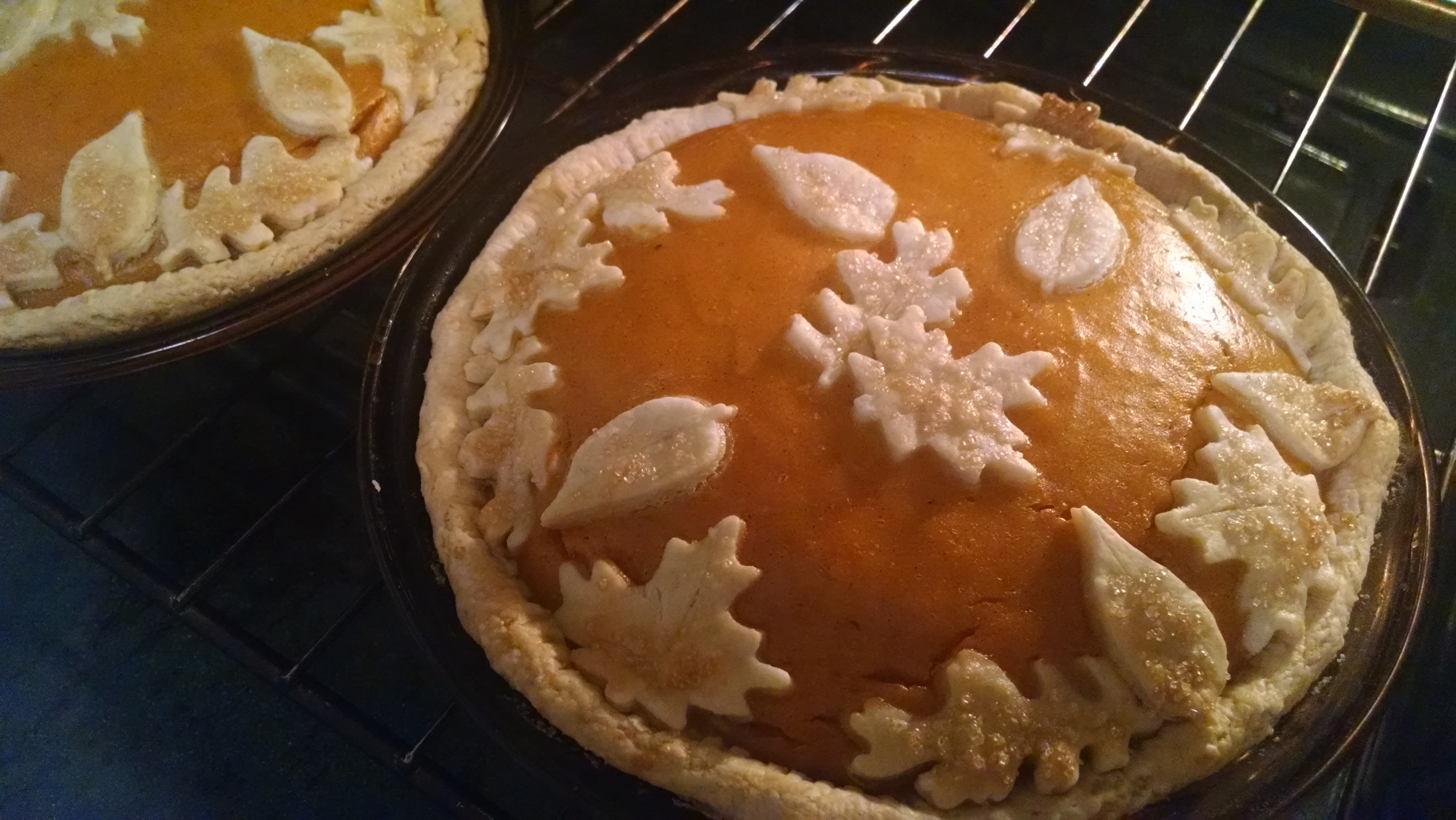
Sweet potato pie is a popular soul food dessert.

Soul food, a hearty cuisine commonly associated with African Americans in the South (but also common to African Americans nationwide), makes creative use of inexpensive products procured through farming and subsistence hunting and fishing. Pig intestines are boiled and sometimes battered and fried to make chitterlings, also known as "chitlins". Ham hocks and neck bones provide seasoning to soups, beans and boiled greens.

Other common foods, such as fried chicken and fish, macaroni and cheese, cornbread, and hoppin' john (black-eyed peas and rice) are prepared simply. When the African-American population was considerably more rural than it generally is today, rabbit, opossum, squirrel, and waterfowl were important additions to the diet. Many of these food traditions are especially predominant in many parts of the rural South.

Traditionally prepared soul food is often high in fat, sodium, and starch. Highly suited to the physically demanding lives of laborers, farmhands and rural lifestyles generally, it is now a contributing factor to obesity, heart disease, high cholesterol, high blood pressure, and diabetes in a population that has become increasingly more urban and sedentary. As a result, more health-conscious African Americans are using alternative methods of preparation, eschewing trans fats in favor of refined vegetable oils and substituting smoked turkey for fatback and other, cured pork products; limiting the amount of refined sugar in desserts; and emphasizing the consumption of more fruits and vegetables than animal protein. There is some resistance to such changes, however, as they involve deviating from long culinary tradition.

Other soul foods African Americans cook are chicken and waffles and desserts like banana pudding, peach cobbler, red velvet cake and sweet potato pie. Kool-Aid is considered a soul food beverage.

Okra came from Ethiopia and Eritrea. Rice, common to Lowcountry region of South Carolina and Georgia, was imported from the island of Madagascar. Soul food is similar to gypsy cooking in Europe. The roots of soul food are spread up and down the West Coast of Africa, including countries like Senegal, Guinea, Sierra Leone, Liberia, Ivory Coast, Ghana, Togo, Cameroon, Gabon, Nigeria and Angola, as well as in Western European countries such as Scotland, but the fruits can be found across America.

== Holidays and observances ==
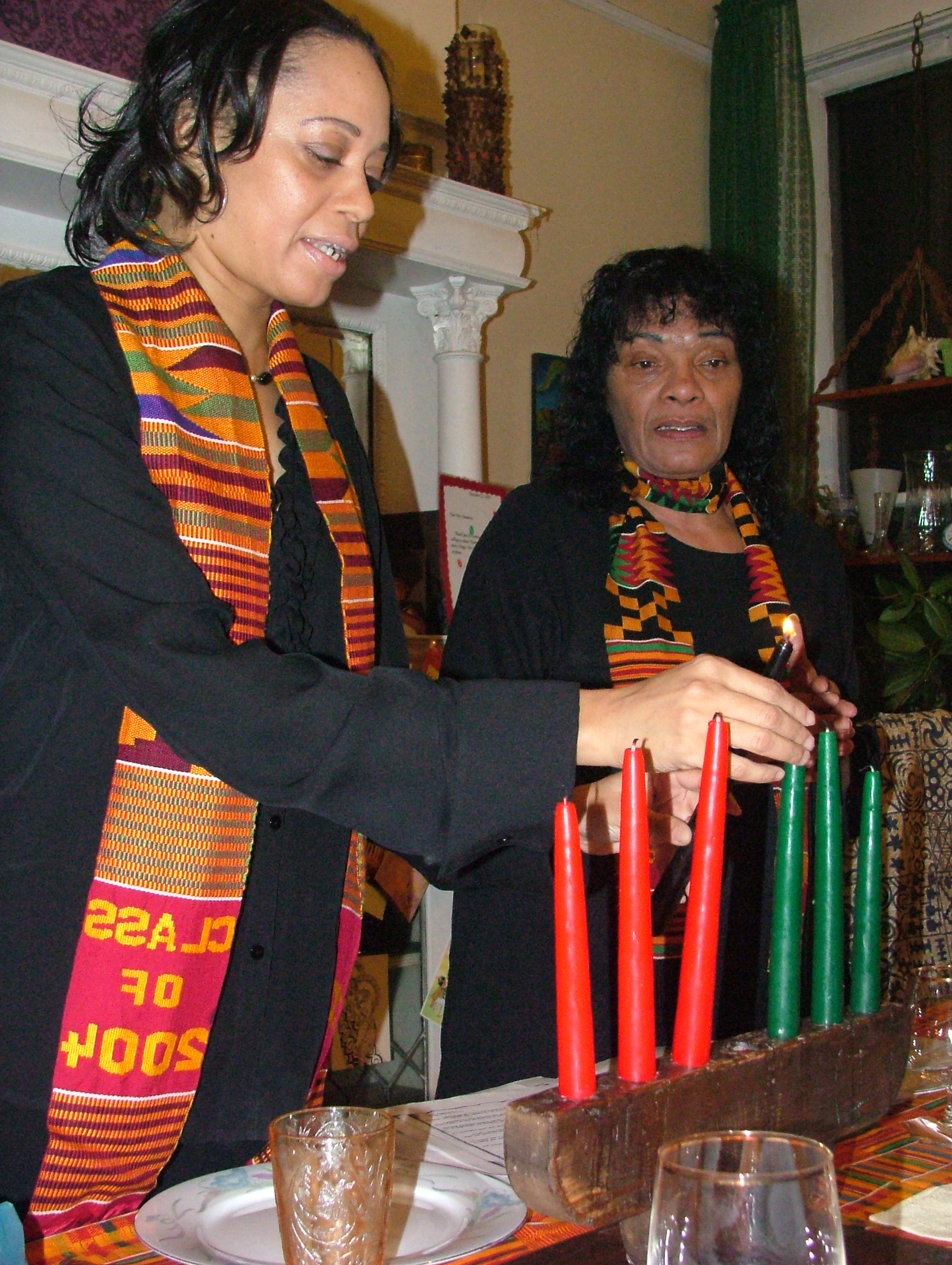
Kwanzaa is an African American holiday.

As with other American racial and ethnic groups, African Americans observe ethnic holidays alongside traditional American holidays. Holidays observed in African-American culture are also widely considered to be American holidays. The birthday of noted American civil rights leader Martin Luther King Jr. has been observed nationally since 1983. It is one of four federal holidays named for an individual.

Black History Month is another example of another African-American observance that has been adopted nationally and its teaching is even required by law in some states. Black History Month is an attempt to focus attention on previously neglected aspects of the American history, chiefly the lives and stories of African Americans. It is observed during the month of February to coincide with the founding of the NAACP and the birthdays of Frederick Douglass, a prominent African-American abolitionist, and Abraham Lincoln, the United States president who signed the Emancipation Proclamation.

On June 7, 1979, President Jimmy Carter decreed that June would be the month of black music. Black Music Month is observed through various events urging citizens to revel in various genres of music, including gospel and hip-hop. African-American musicians, singers, and composers are acknowledged for their contributions to the nation's history and culture.

Less-widely observed outside of the African-American community is Emancipation Day. Emancipation Days occur regionally across the African-American community. The most popularly known Emancipation Day is Juneteenth or Freedom Day, made in recognition of the official reading of the Emancipation Proclamation on June 19, 1865, in Texas. Juneteenth is a day when African Americans reflect on their unique history and heritage. It is one of the fastest growing African-American holidays with observances in the United States. Juneteenth was recognized as federal holiday in 2021, and was first observed as such on June 19, 2021.

In addition, other holidays celebrated were African American Day in Louisiana along with African American Emancipation Day across the United States in the 19th century after the abolition of slavery.

Another holiday not widely observed outside of the African-American community is the birthday of Malcolm X. The day is observed on May 19 in American cities with a significant African-American population, including Washington, D.C.

Another noted African-American holiday is Kwanzaa. Like Emancipation Day, it is not widely observed outside of the African-American community, although it is growing in popularity with both African-American and African communities. African-American scholar and activist "Maulana" Ron Karenga invented the festival of Kwanzaa in 1966, as an alternative to the increasing commercialization of Christmas. Derived from the harvest rituals of Africans, Kwanzaa is observed each year from December 26 through January 1. Participants in Kwanzaa celebrations affirm their African heritage and the importance of family and community by drinking from a unity cup; lighting red, black, and green candles; exchanging heritage symbols, such as African art; and recounting the lives of people who struggled for African and African-American freedom.

== Names ==
Although many African-American names are common among the larger population of the United States, distinct naming trends have emerged within African-American culture. Prior to the 1950s and 1960s, most African-American names closely resembled those used within European American culture. A dramatic shift in naming traditions began to take shape in the 1960s and 1970s in America. With the rise of the mid-century Civil Rights Movement, there was a dramatic rise in names of various origins. The practice of adopting neo-African or Islamic names gained popularity during that era. Efforts to recover African heritage inspired selection of names with deeper cultural significance. Before this, using African names was uncommon because African Americans were several generations removed from the last ancestor to have an African name, as slaves were often given the names of their enslavers, which were of European origin.

African-American names have origins in many languages including French, Latin, English, Arabic, and African languages. One very notable influence on African-American names is the Muslim religion. Islamic names entered the popular culture with the rise of The Nation of Islam among Black Americans with its focus on civil rights. The popular name "Aisha" has origins in the Qur'an. Despite the origins of these names in the Muslim religion and the place of the Nation of Islam in the civil rights movement, many Muslim names such as Jamal and Malik entered popular usage among Black Americans simply because they were fashionable, and many Islamic names are now commonly used by African Americans regardless of their religion. Names of African origin began to crop up as well. Names like Ashanti, Tanisha, Aaliyah, Malaika have origins in the continent of Africa.

By the 1970s and 1980s, it had become common within the culture to invent new names, although many of the invented names took elements from popular existing names. Prefixes such as La/Le-, Da/De-, Ra/Re-, or Ja/Je- and suffixes such as -ique/iqua, -isha, and -aun/-awn are common, as well as inventive spellings for common names.

Even with the rise of creative names, it is also still common for African Americans to use biblical, historic, or European names.

== Family ==
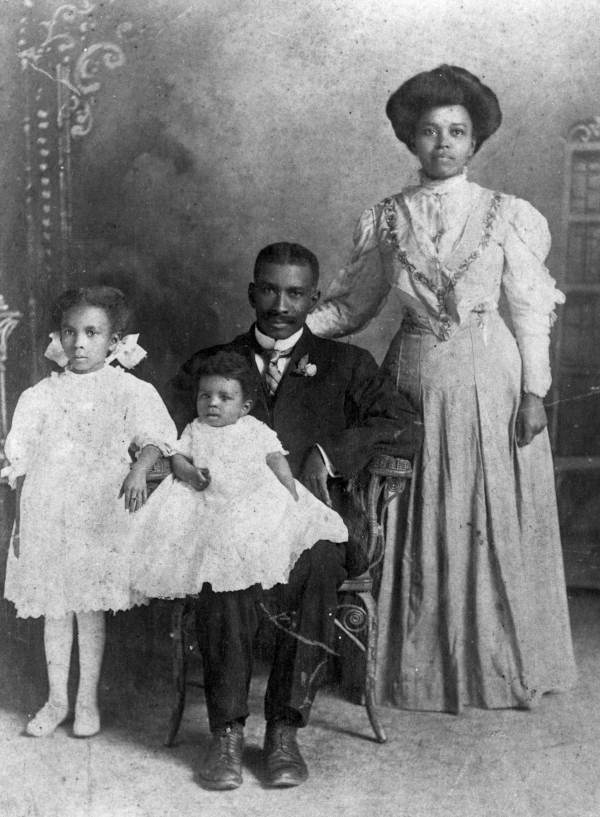
An African-American family in Gainesville, Florida.

When slavery was practiced in the United States, it was common for families to be separated through sale. Even during slavery, however, many African-American families managed to maintain strong familial bonds. Free African men and women, who managed to buy their own freedom by being hired out, who were emancipated, or who had escaped the slave holder, often worked long and hard to buy the members of their families who remained in bondage and send for them.

Others, separated from blood kin, formed close bonds based on fictive kin; play relations, play aunts, cousins, and the like. This practice, a holdover from African oral traditions such as sanankouya, survived Emancipation, with non-blood family friends commonly accorded the status and titles of blood relations. This broader, more African concept of what constitutes family and community, and the deeply rooted respect for elders that is part of African traditional societies, may be the genesis of the common use of the terms like "cousin" (or "cuz"), "aunt", "uncle", "brother", "sister", "Mother", and "Mama" when addressing other African-American people, some of whom may be complete strangers.

76% of African Americans have said they have spoken with their relatives to learn about their family history.

=== African-American family structure ===
When African Americans were taken from their homes and forced into slavery, they were separated from mothers, fathers, sisters and brothers and were torn apart from extensive kinship networks. Immediately after slavery, African-American families struggled to reunite and rebuild what had been taken. As late as 1960, when most African Americans lived under some form of segregation, 78 percent of African-American families were headed by married couples. This number steadily declined during the latter half of the 20th century. For the first time since slavery, a majority of African-American children live in a household with only one parent, typically the mother.

This apparent weakness is balanced by mutual-aid systems established by extended family members to provide emotional and economic support. Older family members pass on social and cultural traditions such as religion and manners to younger family members. In turn, the older family members are cared for by younger family members when they cannot care for themselves. These relationships exist at all economic levels in the African-American community, providing strength and support both to the African-American family and the community.

African Americans are less likely to own a pet.

Interracial marriages have increased for African Americans since Loving Vs. Virginia.

More than half (51.2%) of African-American children lived with a single parent in 2022, compared with about one in five (21.3%) of white American children.

== Politics and social issues ==
Since the passing of the Voting Rights Act of 1965, African Americans are voting and being elected to public office in increasing numbers. As of 2008 the United States had approximately 10,000 African-American elected officials. African Americans overwhelmingly associate with the Democratic Party. Only 11% of African Americans supported George W. Bush in the 2004 Presidential Election. In 2016, only 8% of African Americans voted for Republican Donald Trump while 88% of African Americans voted for Democrat Hillary Clinton.

Social issues such as racial profiling, racial disparities in sentencing, higher rates of poverty, lower access to health care and institutional racism in general are important to the African-American community.

African-Americans may express political and social sentiments through hip-hop culture, including graffiti, break-dancing, rapping, and more. This cultural movement makes statements about historical, as well as present-day topics like street culture and incarceration, and oftentimes expresses a call for change. Hip-hop artists play a prominent role in activism and in fighting social injustices, and have a cultural role in defining and reflecting on political and social issues.

Prominent leaders in the Black church have demonstrated against gay-rights issues such as gay marriage. This stands in stark contrast to the down-low phenomenon of covert male–male sexual acts. Some within the African-American community take a different position, notably the late Coretta Scott King and the Reverend Al Sharpton. Sharpton, when asked in 2003 whether he supported gay marriage, replied that he might as well have been asked if he supported black marriage or white marriage.

One of the most well known social and political organizations of Black culture is the Black Panther Party, a now-defunct African-American socialist organization. Black Culture also utilizes cultural slogans for social and political standing such as Say it Loud, I'm Black and I'm Proud, Black Card, and even "It's a Black Thing, You Wouldn't Understand", a popular slogan that was born inside of Black American culture, referring to their culture, not race.

== African-American LGBT culture ==
The Black LGBT community refers to the African-American (Black) population who are members of the LGBT community, as a community of marginalized individuals who are further marginalized within their own community. Surveys and research have shown that 80% of African Americans say gays and lesbians endure discrimination compared to the 61% of whites. Black members of the community are seen as "other" due to their race and their sexuality, so they had to combat both racism and homophobia.

Black LGBT first started to be visible during the Harlem Renaissance when a subculture of LGBTQ African-American artists and entertainers emerged. This included people like Alain Locke, Countee Cullen, Langston Hughes, Claude McKay, Wallace Thurman, Richard Bruce Nugent, Bessie Smith, Ma Rainey, Moms Mabley, Mabel Hampton, Alberta Hunter, and Gladys Bentley. Places like Savoy Ballroom and the Rockland Palace hosted drag-ball extravaganzas with prizes awarded for the best costumes. Langston Hughes depicted the balls as "spectacles of color". Historian George Chauncey, author of Gay New York: Gender, Urban Culture, and the Making of the Gay Male World, 1890–1940, wrote that during this period "perhaps nowhere were more men willing to venture out in public in drag than in Harlem".

== Population centers ==
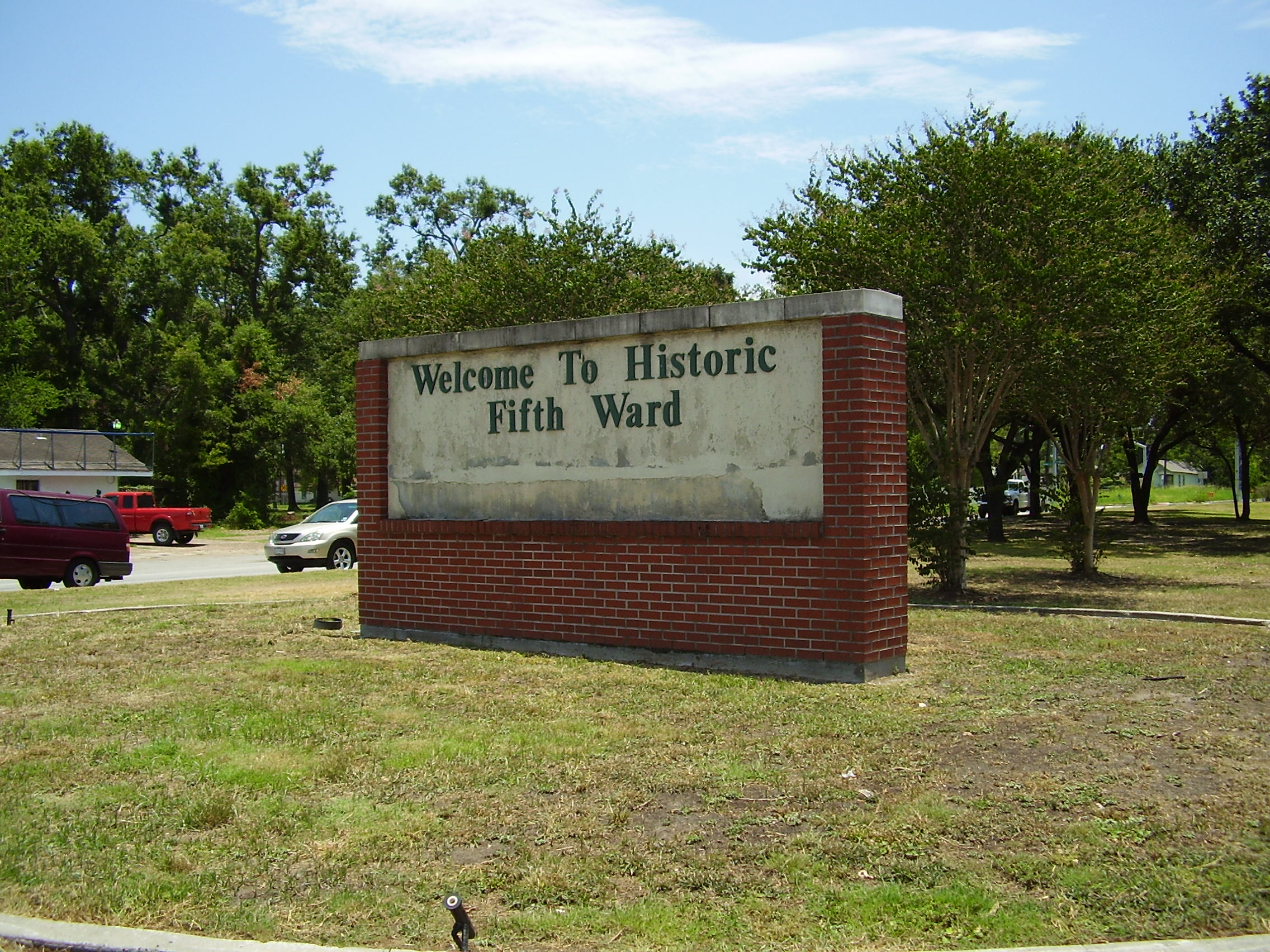
The Fifth Ward, an African-American neighborhood in Houston, Texas

African-American neighborhoods are types of ethnic enclaves found in many cities in the United States. The formation of African-American neighborhoods is closely linked to the history of segregation in the United States, either through formal laws, or as a product of social norms. Despite this, African-American neighborhoods have played an important role in the development of nearly all aspects of both African-American culture and broader American culture. The population centers of communities are Atlanta Baltimore Birmingham Chicago Charleston Charlotte Cleveland D.C Detroit Houston Jackson Los Angeles Memphis Miami New York New Orleans Oakland Philadelphia Richmond

=== Ghettos ===
Due to segregated conditions and widespread poverty, some African-American neighborhoods in the United States have been called "ghettos". The use of this term is controversial and, depending on the context, potentially offensive. Despite mainstream America's use of the term "ghetto" to signify a poor urban area populated by ethnic minorities, those living in the area often used it to signify something positive. The African-American ghettos did not always contain dilapidated houses and deteriorating projects, nor were all of its residents poverty-stricken. For many African Americans, the ghetto was "home", a place representing authentic "blackness" and a feeling, passion, or emotion derived from the rising above the struggle and suffering of being of African descent in America.

Although African-American neighborhoods may suffer from civic disinvestment, with lower-quality schools, less-effective policing and fire protection, there are institutions such as churches and museums and political organizations that help to improve the physical and social capital of African-American neighborhoods. In African-American neighborhoods the churches may be important sources of social cohesion. For some African Americans, the kind spirituality learned through these churches works as a protective factor against the corrosive forces of racism. Museums devoted to African-American history are also found in many African-American neighborhoods.

Many African-American neighborhoods are located in inner cities, and these are the mostly residential neighborhoods located closest to the central business district. The built environment is often row houses or brownstones, mixed with older single-family homes that may be converted to multi-family homes. In some areas there are larger apartment buildings. Shotgun houses are an important part of the built environment of some southern African-American neighborhoods. The houses consist of three to five rooms in a row with no hallways. This African-American house design is found in both rural and urban southern areas, mainly in African-American communities and neighborhoods.

== Flag ==
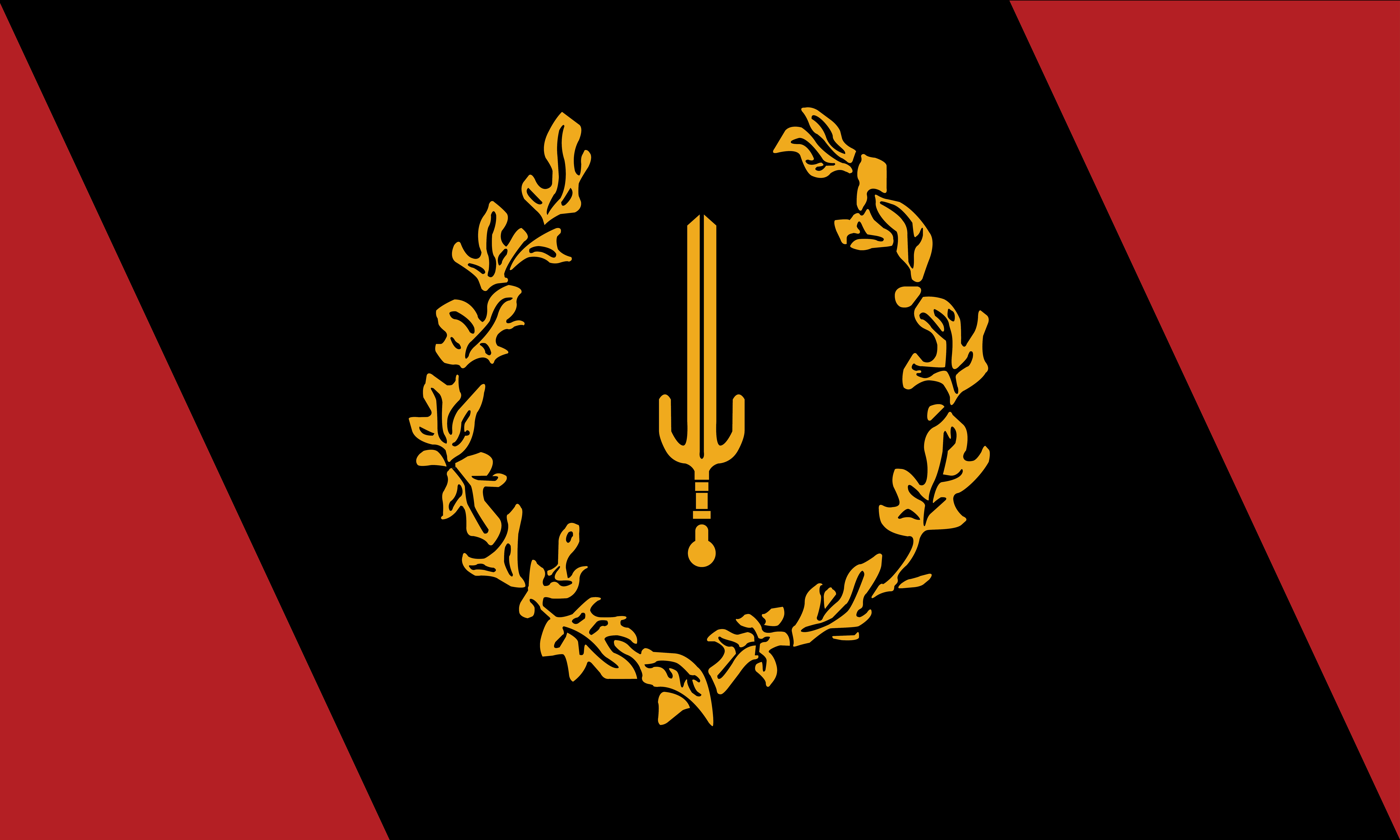
Black-American Heritage Flag

The Black American Heritage Flag is an ethnic flag that represents the culture and history of Black American ethnic groups. The flag was created in 1967 by Melvin Charles and Gleason T. Jackson. According to the designers, "the elements of the flag include the color black to represent pride and pigmentation and race; red, to remind us of the rich blood black men have shed for freedom, equality, justice and human dignity throughout the world; and gold, to represent intellect, prosperity, and peace.

== Social networks ==
BlackPeopleMeet.com logo

There are African-American social networking websites such as BlackPlanet. Social media is an important political outlet for African Americans. African-American teenagers are the biggest users of Instagram and Snapchat. TikTok, Facebook and YouTube are also popular among African Americans.

== Professions ==
Historically, Black Americans have been excluded from various professions and have faced overrepresentation in certain fields. The separation of the American labor force traces back to colonial times when white laborers frequently declined to associate with free blacks in the North. Following the Civil War, as 4 million former slaves gained their freedom, white Southerners were intent on ensuring that African Americans remained engaged in low-level agricultural labor. Vagrancy laws and limitations on labor mobility compelled numerous free blacks to become sharecroppers, a job that offered minimal prospects for social advancement. As the Southern United States started industrializing in the late 1800s and early 1900s, business owners barred Black Americans from skilled positions in Southern factories, while white unions in the North also discriminated against blacks. Consequently, African Americans were increasingly restricted to unskilled jobs in lumber, mining, and shipping sectors—rural industries requiring inexpensive labor in isolated areas. Labor camps had inadequate working conditions, and the pay was minimal. These circumstances compelled numerous African American women to join the labor force in the late 1800s to supply their families with essential income, a trend distinctive to the black community. In 1870, for instance, roughly 49 percent of black women in the country were employed, whereas only 16.5 percent of white women had jobs. The vast majority of African American women employed were found in service positions such as laundresses, domestic workers, and cooks. While certain black men and women attempted to push for improved working conditions, social obstacles in the South rendered their efforts mostly ineffective. By 1900, almost 85 percent of African Americans in the South were employed as laborers, farmers, planters, farm supervisors, domestic workers, waitstaff, and laundry employees.

== Herbalism ==
African Americans have used various herbs such as black walnut, elderberry, sage, mullein, cotton, sassafras, basil leaf and wormwood. Slave women used cotton seeds, bark and roots for menstrual issues and to prevent pregnancies.

== Cultural appropriation ==
Wiggers are white people who appropriate black culture. White people such as Eminem have utilized, used, adopted, and appropriated elements of African American culture as a means to articulate their own dissent. In 2015, Rachel Dolezal went viral for pretending to be black. Other white celebrities who have been accused of appropriating African-American culture are Ariana Grande, Kim Kardashian, Iggy Azalea, Post Malone and Elvis Presley.

== Education ==
African Americans have valued education since slavery. African-American communities have worked together to firm and finance public schools. Even when they were barred from accessing education, Black Americans worked together with their supporters to build black colleges for black people. Education for black slaves was heavily prohibited. Enslaved black children and black adults had to take extreme measures to gain literacy, including having to attend underground schools. White Southern slaveholders generally opposed slave literacy in the Southern United States.

Some of the most prominent institutions of Black Culture are the historically Black Colleges and Universities, known as HBCUs. There are over 100 HBCUs in the United States of America.

== Literature ==
African-American literature emerged in the 18th century, with Phillis Wheatley, an enslaved author, being the first African American to have written published books of poetry. Other prominent authors include W. E. B. Du Bois, Booker T. Washington, Richard Wright, Gwendolyn Brooks, and Alice Walker.

Before the American Civil War, the literature primarily consisted of memoirs by people who had escaped from enslavement the genre of slave narratives included accounts of life in enslavement and the path of justice and redemption to freedom. There was an early distinction between the literature of freed slaves and the literature of free blacks born in the North. Free blacks expressed their oppression in a different narrative form. Free blacks in the North often spoke out against enslavement and racial injustices by using the spiritual narrative. The spiritual addressed many of the same themes of enslaved people narratives but has been largely ignored in current scholarly conversation.

== Folklore ==
Historically, African-American folklore revolved around the storytelling and oral history of enslaved African Americans. Prevalent themes in African-American folktales include tricksters, life lessons, the hardships of slavery, and heartwarming tales. African Americans told stories of folk spirits that could outwit their slaveholders and defeat their enemies. These folk stories gave hope to enslaved people that folk spirits would free them from slavery. Folktales have been used to perpetuate negative stereotypes about the African-American community.

== See also ==
- African-American beauty
- African-American dance
- African-American folktales
- African-American history
- African-American newspapers
- African-American Vernacular English
- African diaspora
- Africanisms
- Culture of the Southern United States
- History of African-American education
- History of the Southern United States
- Appropriations of African-American Culture
- Wigger – White person who emulates Black culture
- Archives of African American Music and Culture
- Culture of the United States
- Cool (aesthetic) § African Americans
- Historically black colleges and universities
- Imaging Blackness
- National Museum of African American History and Culture
- Black Catholicism
- Auburn Avenue Research Library on African American Culture and History
- African-American Flag
- Mojo (African-American culture)
- List of African-American holidays
- Pan-African flag – Flag using the Pan-African colours
- Hip-hop culture – Subculture including music, dance and graffiti
- Louisiana Creole people#Culture
- Freaknik
- Native American cultures in the United States
- Mexican American culture

== Bibliography ==
- Hamilton, Marybeth: In Search of the Blues.
- William Ferris; Give My Poor Heart Ease: Voices of the Mississippi Blues – The University of North Carolina Press; (2009) ISBN 978-0-8078-3325-4 (with CD and DVD)
- William Ferris; Glenn Hinson The New Encyclopedia of Southern Culture: Volume 14: Folklife, University of North Carolina Press (2009) ISBN 978-0-8078-3346-9 (Cover :photo of James Son Thomas)
- William Ferris; Blues From The Delta – Da Capo Press; revised edition (1988) ISBN 978-0-306-80327-7
- Ted Gioia; Delta Blues: The Life and Times of the Mississippi Masters Who Revolutionized American Music – W. W. Norton & Company (2009) ISBN 978-0-393-33750-1
- Sheldon Harris; Blues Who's Who Da Capo Press, 1979
- Robert Nicholson; Mississippi Blues Today! Da Capo Press (1999) ISBN 978-0-306-80883-8
- Robert Palmer; Deep Blues: A Musical and Cultural History of the Mississippi Delta – Penguin Reprint edition (1982) ISBN 978-0-14-006223-6
- Frederic Ramsey Jr.; Been Here And Gone – 1st edition (1960) Rutgers University Press – London Cassell (UK) and New Brunswick, New Jersey; 2nd printing (1969) Rutgers University Press New Brunswick, New Jersey; (2000) University of Georgia Press
- Wiggins, David K. and Ryan A. Swanson, eds. Separate Games: African American Sport behind the Walls of Segregation. University of Arkansas Press, 2016. xvi, 272 pp.
- Charles Reagan Wilson, William Ferris, Ann J. Adadie; Encyclopedia of Southern Culture (1656 pp) University of North Carolina Press; 2nd edition (1989) – ISBN 978-0-8078-1823-7

=== Primary sources ===
- Bureau of Education, Department of the Interior. Negro Education: A Study of the Private and Higher Schools for Colored People in the United States, Volume II. (Bulletin, 1916, No. 39, 1917) online
