= Urban culture =

Culture of cities

Urban culture is the culture of towns and cities. Its defining theme is a large population in a limited space that follows social norms. This allows many subcultures to exist close together, exposed to social influence without necessarily intruding on the private sphere. Ultimately, urban culture offers diverse perspectives and more resources in the medical field, both physically and mentally, but it also faces challenges in maintaining social cohesion.

Globally, urban areas frequently serve as centers of political and economic power, housing government institutions, corporate headquarters, and other influential organization. Cities also organize people, create norms, beliefs, and values. As outlined by Max Weber in his book, The City, "There are five things that make a city: fortification, market, a law code, an association of urban citizenry creating a sense of municipal corporateness, and sufficient political autonomy for urban citizens to choose the city’s governors." In some regions, suburbanization and residential segregation have led higher income populations to move away from central urban areas (e.g. white flight in the United States).

== Politics and social trends ==
=== Political ===
In most of the Western world, urban areas tend to be politically to the left of suburban and rural areas. There has always been a large difference in political views between these areas for a variety of reasons. A 2018 survey undertaken by the Pew Research Center shows that people who live in an urban area will most likely have political views that clash with someone who lives in a suburban or rural area. An example of this is how people in this survey felt about U.S. president Donald Trump. Sixty two percent of people had negative feelings on the president in urban areas, this number drops quite a bit when you look at suburban areas as only fifty one percent of people disliked the way the president ran things. This number hits its lowest when you look at rural areas as forty percent of people were negative on Trump with the rest being either neutral or positive. This divide on political subjects continues for the rest of the survey with urban areas preferring more progressive changes while suburban and rural areas want to hang on to traditions. The reason for why there is such a difference in opinion between these areas is a question that still doesn't have a solid answer. Although that has not stopped many people from trying to find one, this includes Cornell University professor Suzanne Mettler, who wrote a full article going over possible reasons for why there is such a difference between urban and rural voters. One reason Mettler came up with was the increase in the amount of jobs as she wrote "For decades the U.S. has experienced deindustrialization and various other changes in jobs and the economy, and rural areas have really suffered. Urban areas have adapted more effectively and created new jobs in technology, the service sector, and the knowledge economy. We think that economic deterioration has perhaps led to more resentment and grievance-style politics, but we’re still trying to understand that." Overall the difference in opinion between areas will always exist for a variety of reasons from education, to economic setting, and even to parental guidance.

=== Social ===
Urban cities have grown in popularity recently due to people moving out of more rural areas as time goes on. This is shown in another article written by the "Pew Research Center" which states "Likewise, recent U.S. population growth also has been uneven. Urban counties have grown at roughly the overall national rate of 13% since 2000. Suburban and small metropolitan areas have grown more briskly. Rural counties have lagged, and half of them have fewer residents now than they did in 2000". This trend has been happening for a variety of reasons, such as the increase of migrants, a rise in birth rate and a drop off in death rate, and people preferring the bustling city life of an urban area over more quiet and isolated rural areas.

Urban areas are able to provide things that rural and suburban areas either cannot, such as regular public transportation, a varied ethnic pool to make meeting new people an easy process, more jobs available, and the ease of which you are able to reach stores or entertainment areas such as clubs and bars. These points are far more relevant when you consider the ages of people who live in urban areas compared to anywhere else. The median age of rural areas is 43 years old while the average for urban areas is 36. Younger people are more likely to go looking for jobs in the city because it would be far easier to look for a job in a densely populated area rather than on the countryside where everything is spaced out. Transportation is also a more simple process for the younger generation as simply taking a bus to school or work can be easier for a young adult than buying a car and managing all the expenses that can come with that. Finally with entertainment areas being so close together younger people are able to have a night out instead of having to drive a large distance to clubs and bars; an issue that is prevalent in rural areas due to being located in the country.

Pope Francis acknowledges, however, the potential for city life to be a chaotic existence.

== By country ==
=== Canada ===
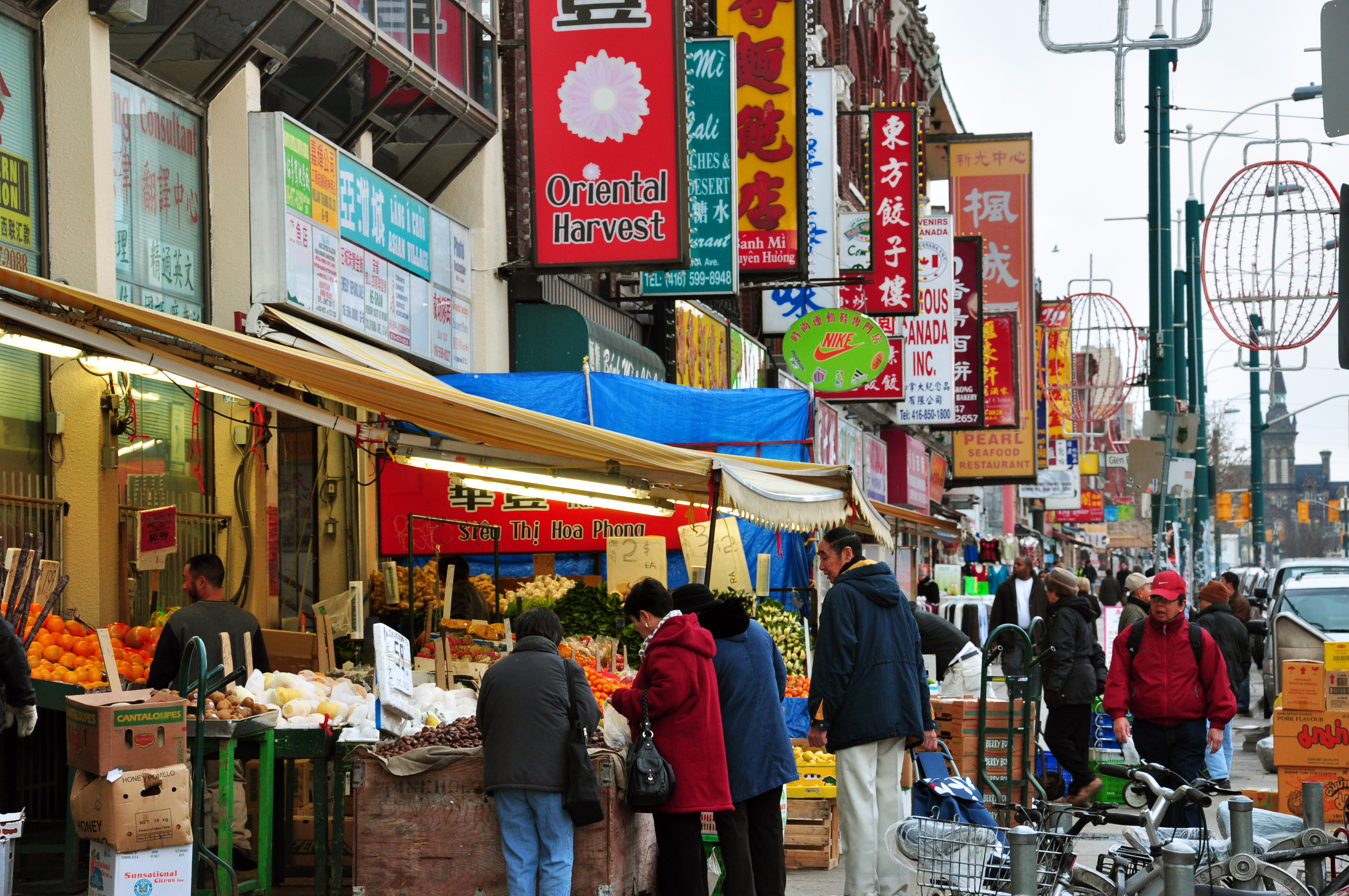
Toronto's Chinatown. The everyday use of, and availability of services in, many languages is promoted by municipal government.

Urban culture is a huge part of Canada as 81.65% of Canada's inhabitants live in cities. The urbanization of Canada has been decades in the making starting back in the 19th century. From 1871 to 1911 the population of Canada would double from 3.6 million to 7.2 million. Most of this growth can be attributed thanks to urban cities expanding in order to allow more people to live there. Author John Douglas Belshaw wrote a book about the history of Canada and went into detail about the rise of urban culture in Canada when he wrote "Most of that growth was in urban areas as the share of the workforce engaged in non-agricultural pursuits rose from 51.9% to over 60% in the same period. [2] Even in Nova Scotia, where the benefits of industrialization were not long lasting nor very deep, the impact on the scale of urban settlements was very dramatic: in the decade after Confederation, Halifax grew by 22%, New Glasgow by 55%, Sydney Mines by 57%, and Truro by 64%." By the 1890s industrialization was taking effect in Canada with the production of machinery and the increasing use of things such as oil and coal which was boosting the population of places such as Toronto and Edmonton rapidly. Urbanization would continue into the 20th century with Canadians and immigrants moving from city to city for work due to the now dense population and job openings that come from that. It wasn't all well and good however as due to the increasing population things would become crowded and harder to accommodate every single city and their needs. This means that lesser cities would be run down with water systems that would not work and houses that were shabbily built in order to quickly prepare for the spike of people living in the city. As we move in the modern era these issues aren't as prevalent in Canada but there are still underdeveloped cities and people flocking to find some sort of work in an extremely competitive urban environment.

Urban culture is also sometimes used as a euphemism for the culture of visible minorities (non-Whites). Sometimes this means Black Canadian culture, this connection is much less apparent than somewhere like the U.S. due to blacks only making up 3% of the total population. More generally, the phrase may be used to connote the multicultural, immigrant-friendly mosaic atmosphere cultivated by cities such as Toronto, Vancouver, and British Columbia.

=== United States ===
In the United States, Urban culture has been used as a euphemistic reference to contemporary African American culture.

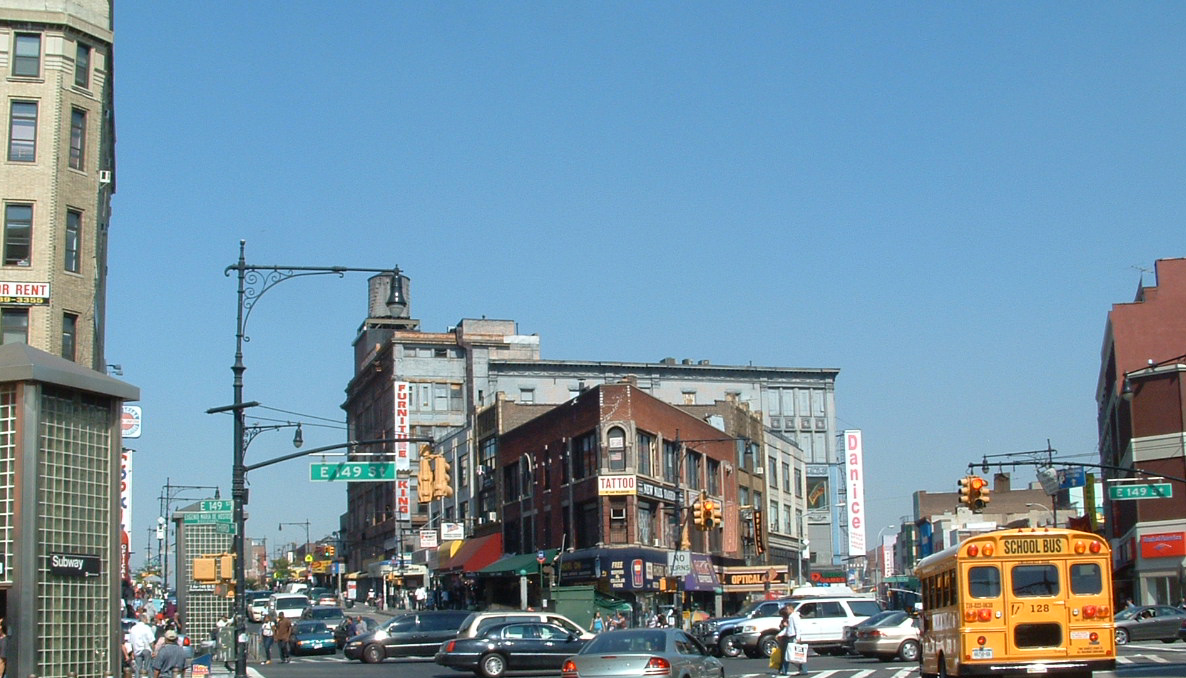
The Hub is the retail heart of the South Bronx, New York City. Between 1900 and 1930, the number of Bronx residents increased from 201,000 to 1,265,000.

Prior to the 20th century, the African American population was primarily rural. The Great Migration of African-Americans created the first large, urban black communities in the American North. It is conservatively estimated that 400,000 left the South during the two-year period of 1916–1918 to take advantage of a labor shortage created in the wake of the First World War. The 20th century cultures of many of the United States' modern cities were forged in this period.

In 1910, the African American population of Detroit was 6,000. By the start of the Great Depression in 1929, this figure had risen to 120,000.

In 1900 Chicago had a total population of 1,698,575. By 1920 the population had increased by more than 1 million residents. During the second wave of the Great Migration (from 1940 to 1960), the African American population in the city grew from 278,000 to 813,000. The South Side of Chicago was considered the black capital of America.

The massive number of African Americans to Ohio, in particularly to Cleveland, greatly changed the demographics of the state and Cleveland. Prior to the Great Migration, an estimated 1.1 - 1.6% of Cleveland's population was African American. In 1920, 4.3% of Cleveland's population was African American. The number of African Americans in Cleveland continued to rise over the next twenty years of the Great Migration. Other cities, such as St. Louis, Baltimore, Philadelphia and New York City, also experienced surges in their African-American populations.

In the South, the departure of hundreds of thousands of African Americans caused the black percentage of the population in most Southern states to decrease. For example, in Mississippi, blacks decreased from about 56% of the population in 1910 to about 37% by 1970 and in South Carolina, blacks decreased from about 55% of the population in 1910 to about 30% by 1970.

By the end of the Second Great Migration, African Americans had become an urbanized population. More than 80 percent lived in cities. Fifty-three percent remained in the Southern United States, while 40 percent lived in the Northeast and North Central states and 7 percent in the West.

== See also ==
- Inner city
- Street culture (disambiguation)
- African-American culture
- Graffiti
- Hip hop music
- Hipster (contemporary subculture)
- Street Life, the Crusaders song and album of 1979

Other

- Futurism
- Chicago School (sociology)
- Principles of Intelligent Urbanism
- Urbanism
- Urban economics
- Urban sociology
- Urban pop culture
- Hip hop fashion
- Urban contemporary
- Urban vitality
