= Cultural movement =

Period and movement in cultural history

A cultural movement is a shared effort by loosely affiliated individuals to change the way others in society think by disseminating ideas through various art forms and making intentional choices in daily life. By definition, cultural movements are intertwined with other phenomena such as social movements and political movements, and can be difficult to distinguish from broader cultural change or transformation.

== Art movement ==
An art movement is a change with a specific art philosophy or goal, followed by a group of artists during a specific period of time defined within a number of years.

== Social movement ==
A social movement is an organized effort by a large group of people to achieve a particular goal, typically a social or political one. This may be to carry out a social change, or to resist or undo one. It is a type of group action and may involve individuals, organizations, or both.

== Political movement ==
A political movement is an attempt by a group of people to change government policy or social values in society. They are often associated with a certain ideology.

== See also ==
- List of art movements
- Critical theory
- Cultural imperialism
- Cultural sensibility
- History of philosophy
- Postliterate society
- Periodization
