= Show and tell =

School activity

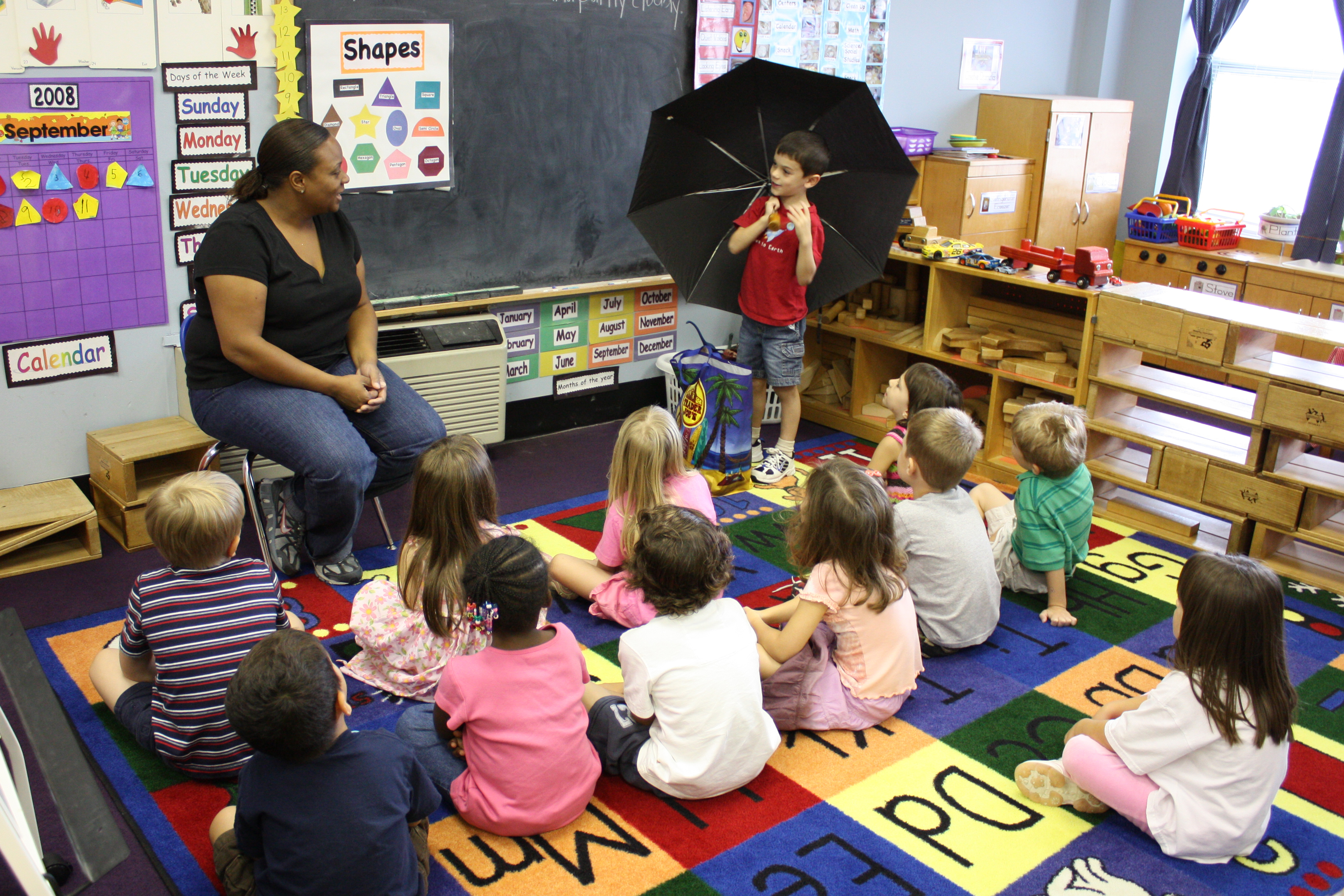
In this "show and tell" activity, a child is describing an umbrella he brought in.

Show and tell (sometimes called show and share or sharing time) is the practice of showing something to an audience and describing it to them, usually a toy or other children's-oriented item. In the United Kingdom, North America, New Zealand and Australia, it is a common classroom activity in early elementary school. In a typical session of show and tell, a child will bring an item from home and will explain to the class why they chose that particular item, where they got it, and other relevant information.

The exact origins of show and tell are unknown, but it was written about as early as 1954 in the journal Childhood Education. Show and tell is used to develop storytelling ability, bridge school and home, forge connections and bonds between students, help teachers to gain a better understanding of their students, and enhance student's communication skills, including around feelings. It can also be used to build public speaking skills such as voice projection and poise. Variants of show and tell have been used to teach vocabulary. Although often thought of as an activity for younger children, teachers have described successfully bringing it into classrooms of students in middle and even secondary grades. The name has also been used to describe other educational practices, such as a way for students to demonstrate mathematical thinking.

The teacher's role in show and tell can vary. The teacher may suggest a theme for the objects, such as particular vocabulary words. During the presentation of the object, some teachers do minimal guidance, while other teachers take a more active role in preparing students for the activity, helping students give a successful share, and in guiding questions and comments from other students. A 1994 paper found more involved teaching can lead to better psychological gains for students than a more passive approach.

A 2014 study found over 50 picture books about show and tell.

Show and tell has been criticized for the amount of time it takes, monotony, and for penalizing shy students.

== See also ==
- Idiom
- Circle time
