= Down by the Banks of the Hanky Panky =

Clapping and singing game

Down by the Banks of the Hanky Panky, often shortened to just Down by the Banks, is a clapping and singing game in which players sit in a circle and clap the hand of the person next to them in sequence while singing the titular rhyming song. When the song ends, the person whose hand was clapped last is out and the game restarts after they leave the circle.

Down by the Banks is frequently played by school-aged children and has been observed for decades around the United States and Australia. The game is passed down from older children, teachers, or other authority figures in schools, camps, and extracurricular activities. There are many lyrical variations of the game's titular song, often differing between schools.

== Gameplay ==
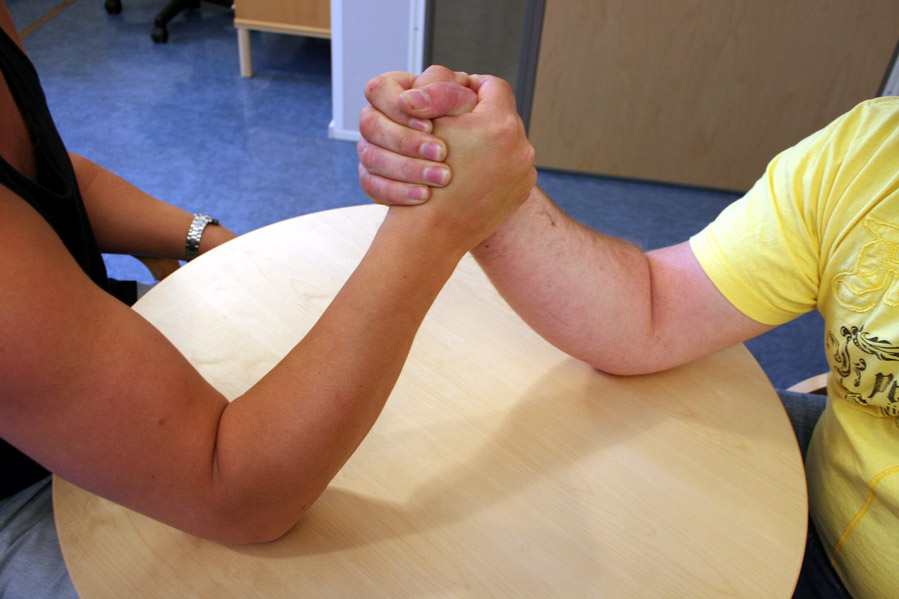
In the last round of a game of Down by the Banks, the remaining two players must hold hands in an arm-wrestling-like position and push their arms back and forth.

Before play, participants sit or stand in a circle with their left hand palm-up on top of the hand of the person to their left and their right hand palm-up under the hand of the person on their right (or vice versa). The game starts as the players begins singing the song and the first player claps their left hand against the left hand of the player to their right, which they are holding with their right hand. That player then "passes" the clap by doing the same to the player on their right, and the clap moves around the circle. When the song ends, whoever's hand was most recently clapped is out. That person must leave the circle and the two people beside them close in to fill in the gap before the game starts anew.

When the game gets down to just two players, the players interlace their fingers and take turns pushing their arms back and forth. At the end of the song, whoever's arm is extended wins.

== Play setting ==
Down by the Banks is generally played by children, particularly young girls. The game originates in the United States, but has been observed elsewhere, such as in Australia. Down by the Banks may be played during class, summer camp, break/waiting times, recess, or extracurricular activities. The game is passed down from older children to younger children or is taught by teachers or other supervisory figures, allowing it to persist in the same schools and environments.

== Lyrics ==
One rendition of Down by the Banks and its clapping rhythm

Many different versions of the song are used. The first verse typically lasts for four lines and begins like this:

Down by the banks of the Hanky Panky

Where the bullfrog[s] jump[s] from bank to bank[y]

The third line is often an alliterative or consonant phrase, such as "with a hip, hop, hippity hop", "with a flip, flop, flippity flop", or "with an eep[s], ipe[s], ope[s], oop[s]". The last line varies but most commonly ends with kerplop.

The lyrics are often considered to be "nonsense" or to mean nothing. Different variations commonly include references to soft drinks.

The origins of the song are unclear. However, in 1912, a similar poem was written by Charles Luther Greaves, with the following first stanza:

He came to the banks

Of the Pasquotank

Where the bullfrogs jump

From bank to bank.

In 1941, an article in the North Carolina newspaper The State noted that the poem was "oft-quoted", having been popular enough to create an arbitrary association between the county of Pasquotank and bullfrogs, despite the lack of any actual bullfrogs in the area.

Another source suggests that the game has origins in the 1890s.

== As an educational tool ==
Down by the Banks requires rhythm, rhyme, and hand-eye coordination. A 1987 paper on children's games and learning suggested that Down by the Banks could also be used to help children understand randomness, empathize with others who are sad about having lost the game, and developing verbal skills and aesthetic awareness.
