= William Tolliver =

American painter

William Tolliver (December 17, 1951 – September 1, 2000) was an American painter and printmaker known for his self-taught mastery of diverse media and his contributions to contemporary African American art. Working across oil, acrylic, watercolor, and oil pastel, Tolliver developed a style he categorized as "representational abstract expressionism." His work frequently highlighted Southern Black labor, jazz and blues musicians, and rural landscapes.

== Early life ==
Tolliver was born in Vicksburg, Mississippi, one of fourteen children. Lacking access to formal art education during his youth, he taught himself the fundamentals of composition, color theory, and art history by reading heavily from library books and studying European masters like Vincent van Gogh and Pablo Picasso.

== Career and style ==
Tolliver emerged as a commercially prominent figure in the 1980s. His art merged modernist techniques, such as cubist-inspired flooded color fields and heavy outlines reminiscent of stained glass, with deeply humanistic depictions of working-class individuals. Key pieces celebrate the dignity of manual laborers and blues musicians. In Tolliver's opinion, the organization of abstract colors was a highly mathematical and analytical process.

In 1996, Tolliver was officially commissioned by the Atlanta Committee for the Olympic Games to paint the official "Spirit of Georgia" poster to commemorate the 1996 Summer Olympics Centennial Games.

== Death and legacy ==
Tolliver died of a heart attack on September 1, 2000, at a hospital in Atlanta at the age of 48. His legacy is marked by his ability to bridge the gap between technical old-master methodology and contemporary African-American historical perspectives.

== Permanent collections ==
Tolliver's works are held in several notable permanent public museum and institutional collections, including:

- New Orleans Museum of Art
- Hampton University Museum
- Corcoran Gallery of Art
- Zigler Art Museum
- McKissick Museum
