= Mexican American culture =

Mexican-American culture is influenced by Mexican culture and American culture. Mexican culture is influenced by Spanish culture and Native American culture.

== Holidays ==
Cinco de Mayo is a holiday that originated from California’s Mexican community. Mexicans also celebrate Mexican Americans celebrate holidays such as Día de los Muertos (Day of the Dead), Mexican Independence Day (Día de la Independencia), Christmas (Navidad), and the Feast of the Virgin of Guadalupe (Día de la Virgen de Guadalupe).

== Religions ==
Mexican-Americans predominantly identify as Catholics and Protestants; however, they also include Mexican American individuals who are Protestants, Muslims, Jews, and Mormons. Religious celebrations hold significant importance within Mexican-American culture, including El Dia de la Virgin de Guadalupe, Easter, Day of the Dead and Christmas. Weddings, baptisms, and first communions are particularly meaningful events for Mexican Americans.

== Cuisine ==
The influence of Mexican cuisine also has led to the creation of various quintessential American dishes, including Frito pies, Mission burritos, Texan chili con carne, yellow cheese enchiladas, fajitas, chimichangas, taco salad, cheese dip, sopapillas and Margaritas.
