= Street culture =

Street culture may refer to:

- Urban culture, the culture of towns and cities
- Street market
- Children's street culture
- Street carnival
- Block party
- Street identity
- Street food
- Café culture
- Several youth subculture or counterculture topics pertaining to outdoors of urban centers. These can include
  - Street art
  - Street dance
  - Street photography
  - Street racing
  - Street wear
  - Hip-hop culture
  - Urban fiction
  - Street sports
    - Street workout
    - Streetball
    - Skateboarding
    - Flatland BMX
  - Parkour
  - Freestyling
