= Circle time =

School group activity

Circle time, also called group time, refers to any time that a group of people, usually young children, are sitting together for an activity involving everyone.

The method is now in widespread use in schools across the UK and the USA. In Scotland, many primary schools use the method regularly, and it is starting to be introduced into secondary schools. It is a special time to share fingerplays, chants and rhymes, songs, play rhythm instruments, read a story, and participate in movement games and relaxation activities. Circle time provides a time for listening, developing attention span, promoting oral communication, and learning new concepts and skills. It is a time for auditory memory, sensory experiences, socialization, and a time for fun. Circle time can be a complex, dynamic interaction among adults, children, and resources used. Teachers have the power to make group time more effective and enjoyable for all involved. It also has roots in social group work and in solution-focused therapeutic approaches.

Murray White was the first British author to publish a book on circle time, and his Magic Circles raised the profile and popularity of circle time during the 1980s.

Jenny Mosley is credited with pioneering and popularising its use in schools, and other group environments. She says that industry used it "to overcome the gulf that can develop between management and the shop floor...the reputation for quality which Japan enjoys can be attributed largely to the widespread use of the approach".

Circle time in the United States is a less formal program. Childcare centers often have one, two, or three group gatherings a day that are referred to as "Circle Time." During this time, the children sit in a circle (usually on a rug) and the teacher may read a book aloud, lead a sing-along, or engage the children in a discussion. Circle times may start with an analysis of the weather and a correlation between the type of clothing that the children are wearing.

== Organization ==
An open circle is made of chairs or cushions, allowing everyone to face each other clearly.

Many schools also use a `talking object` to facilitate discussion. The talking object can be anything (a stuffed toy, a cushion or a decorated piece of wood or plastic). This talking object is then passed around the circle, and only the person who has the talking object is allowed to speak.

The teacher sits on the same type of chair or cushion as everyone else. This helps to signal that what is happening is a special kind of classroom activity in which the teacher is a facilitator rather than a director. The teacher has a special responsibility to make sure that everyone's emotions are protected and that suitable activities are prepared.

== Uses ==
Circle time can be used to help solve problems which have been identified by either the teacher or students. Issues and problems can be identified by brainstorming or by rounds such as, "the best thing about this school is..." and "the worst thing about this school is...". Then the idea is to make sure that if a real problem is identified at least one positive suggestion is agreed on before the session ends.

Games and activities can be engaged in and are designed to promote trust, respect, empathy and understanding which offers participants the security and freedom to explore issues and find ways forward.

Without adequate training, the process can become diluted and ineffectual or misused by teachers to try and shame children publicly and coerce them into 'behaving'. Children can become cynical and apathetic towards the process, detecting a divide between values and action and may come to see it as little more than another control mechanism.
