= Cultural sensibility =

Moral, emotional or aesthetic standards concerning social culture(s)

Cultural sensibility refers to how sensibility ("openness to emotional impressions, susceptibility and sensitiveness") relates to an individual's moral, emotional or aesthetic standards or ideas. The term should not be confused with the more common term "cultural sensitivity".
