= African American Museum =

African American Museum may refer to:

- African American Museum and Library at Oakland, California
- California African American Museum, Los Angeles, California
- African American Museum of the Arts, DeLand, Florida
- African American Museum of Iowa
- African American Museum of Nassau County, Hempstead, New York
- The African American Museum in Cleveland, Ohio
- African American Museum in Philadelphia, Pennsylvania
- African American Museum (Dallas), Texas
- National Museum of African American History and Culture, Washington, D.C.

== See also ==
- List of museums focused on African Americans
