= List of museums focused on African Americans =

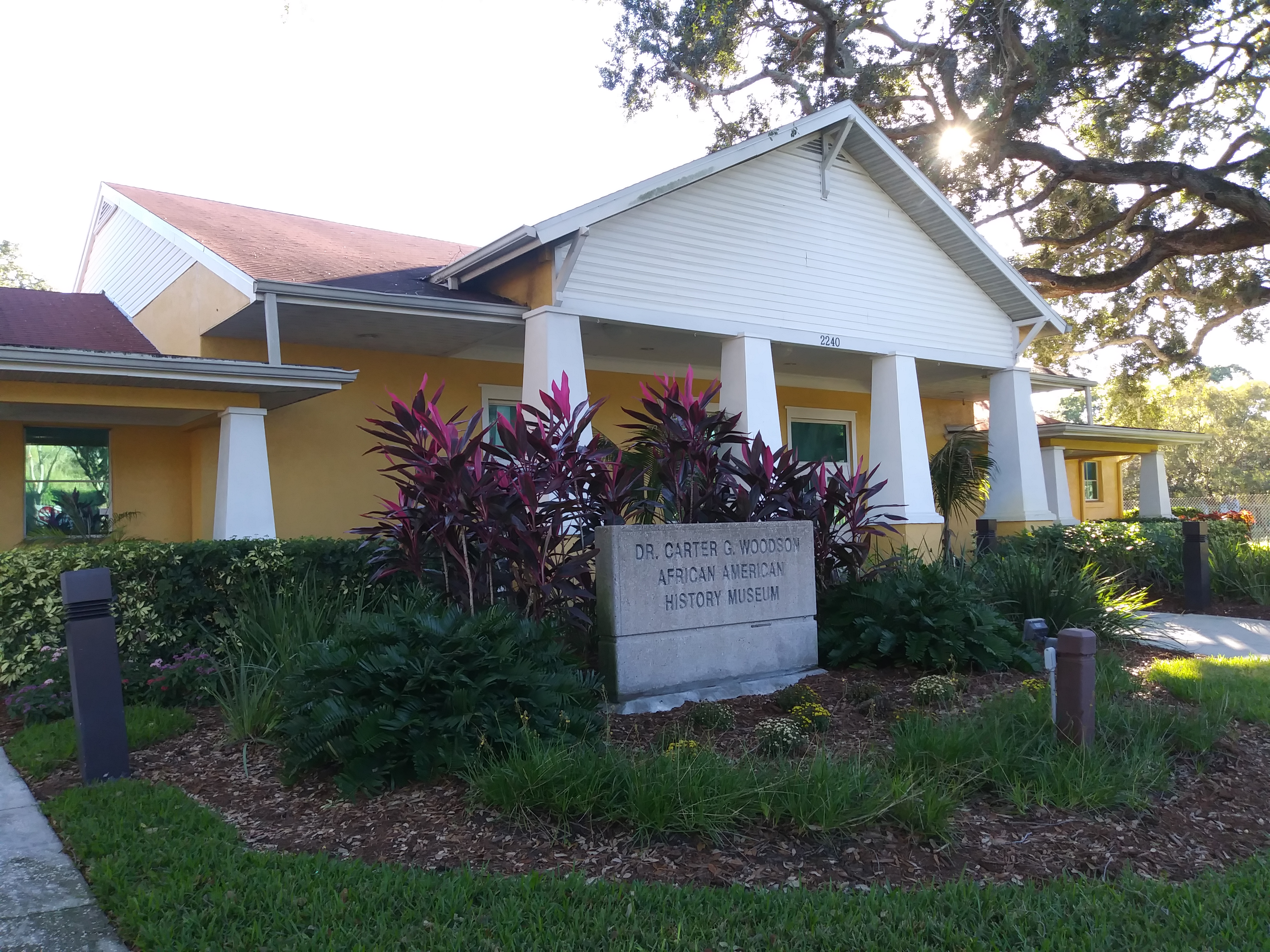
An example of an African American museum: The Dr. Carter G. Woodson African American History Museum. Woodson was the founder of Black History Month and a noted educator.

This is a list of museums in the United States whose primary focus is on African American culture and history. Such museums are commonly known as African American museums. According to scholar Raymond Doswell, an African American museum is "an institution established for the preservation of African-derived culture."

Museums have a mission of "collecting and preserving material on history and cultural heritage." African American museums share these goals with archives, genealogy groups, historical societies, and research libraries. Museums differ from archives, genealogy groups, historical societies, memorials, and research libraries because they have as a basic educational or aesthetic purpose the collection and display of objects, and regular exhibitions for the public. Being open to the public (not just researchers or by appointment) and having regular hours sets museums apart from historical sites or other facilities that may call themselves museums.

== History of African American museums in the United States ==
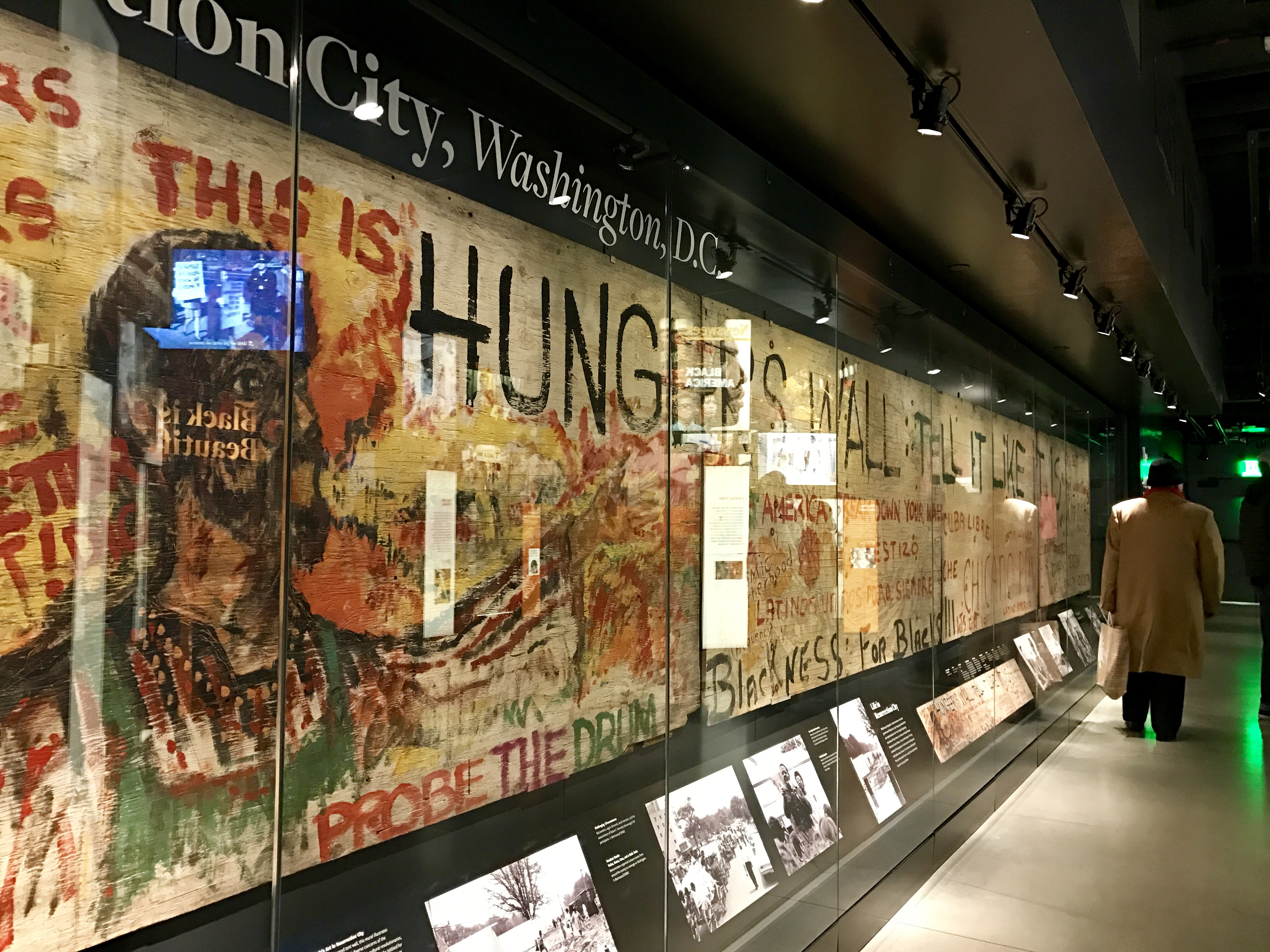
An exhibit at the National Museum of African American History and Culture. Museums not only collect and preserve historic and cultural material, their basic purpose is educational or aesthetic.

The first African American museum was the College Museum in Hampton, Virginia, established in 1868. Prior to 1950, there were about 30 museums devoted to African American culture and history in the United States. These were located primarily at historically black colleges and universities or at libraries that had significant African American culture and history collections.

Important collections were developed at Bennett College in Greensboro, North Carolina; Fisk University in Nashville, Tennessee; Howard University in Washington, D.C.; Lincoln University in Chester County, Pennsylvania; Morgan State University in Baltimore, Maryland; Talladega College in Talladega, Alabama; and Tuskegee University in Tuskegee, Alabama. Additionally, local historical societies, history clubs, and reading groups in African American communities also collected and displayed African American cultural artifacts.

The first independent, nonprofit African American museums in the United States were The African American Museum in Cleveland, Ohio (founded in 1956), the DuSable Museum of African American History in Chicago, Illinois (founded in 1960), and the Charles H. Wright Museum of African American History in Detroit, Michigan (founded in 1965). Throughout the 1960s, the energy of the American Civil Rights Movement led to numerous local African American museums being founded. Between 1868 and 1991, there were about 150 African American museums established in 37 states.

Since its opening in 2016, the largest African American museum in the United States is the Smithsonian Institution's National Museum of African American History and Culture. The previous record holder was the Charles H. Wright Museum of African American History in Detroit, Michigan.

== List of museums ==
This is a sortable table. Click on the column you wish it sorted by.

Image	Name	City	State	Founded	References
	African American Historical and Cultural Museum	Waterloo	Iowa	1997	
	A. Philip Randolph Pullman Porter Museum	Chicago	Illinois	1995	
	Africa Center, The	New York City (Manhattan)	New York	1984	(Note: The museum was known as the Center for African Art at its founding, and changed its name in 1933 to the Museum for African Art. The name was changed again in 2013 to the New Africa Center, and by 2014 had dropped the word "New" in favor of The Africa Center.)
	African American Civil War Memorial Museum	Washington	D.C.	1999	
	African-American Research Library and Cultural Center	Fort Lauderdale	Florida	2002	
	African American Firefighter Museum	Los Angeles	California	1997	
	African American Military History Museum	Hattiesburg	Mississippi	2000	
	African American Multicultural Museum	Scottsdale	Arizona	2005	
	African American Museum	Dallas	Texas	1974	
	African American Museum and Library at Oakland	Oakland	California	1994	
	African American Museum in Cleveland, The	Cleveland	Ohio	1956	
	African American Museum in Philadelphia	Philadelphia	Pennsylvania	1976	
	African American Museum of Iowa	Cedar Rapids	Iowa	2003	
	African American Museum of Nassau County	Hempstead	New York	1970	
	African American Museum of the Arts	DeLand	Florida	1994	
	African American Museum of Southern Illinois	Carbondale	Illinois	1997	
	Afro-American Historical and Cultural Society Museum	Jersey City	New Jersey	1984	
	Alabama State Black Archives Research Center and Museum	Huntsville	Alabama	1990	
	Alexandria Black History Museum	Alexandria	Virginia	1987	(Note: Founded in 1983 by the Parker-Gray Alumni and the Alexandria Society for the Preservation of Black Heritage, the museum was originally an archive known as the Alexandria Black History Research Center. Volunteers staffed the archive. In 1987, the City of Alexandria agreed to take over the archive, expanded its mission, and turned it into the Alexandria Black History Museum.)
	America's Black Holocaust Museum	Milwaukee	Wisconsin	1988	
	Anacostia Museum	Washington	D.C.	1967	
	Anne Spencer House and Garden Museum	Lynchburg	Virginia	1977	
	APEX (African American Panoramic Experience) Museum	Atlanta	Georgia	1978	
	Armstead T. Johnson High School	Montross	Virginia	2000	
	Backstreet Cultural Museum	New Orleans	Louisiana	1999	
	Banneker-Douglass Museum	Annapolis	Maryland	1984	
	Beach Institute African-American Cultural Center	Savannah	Georgia	1990	
	Benjamin Banneker Historical Park and Museum	Oella	Maryland	1998	
	Beck Cultural Exchange Center	Knoxville, Tennessee	Tennessee	1975	
	Bertha Lee Strickland Cultural Museum	Seneca	South Carolina	2015	
	Birmingham Civil Rights Institute	Birmingham	Alabama	1992	
	Black American West Museum and Heritage Center	Denver	Colorado	1971	
	Black Cowboy Museum	Rosenberg	Texas	2017	
	Black History 101 Mobile Museum	Detroit	Michigan	1995	
	Black History Museum and Cultural Center of Virginia	Richmond	Virginia	1981	
	Black History Museum of Warren County	McMinnville	Tennessee	2021	
	Blanchard House Museum	Punta Gorda	Florida	2004	
	Bontemps African American Museum	Alexandria	Louisiana	1988	
	Brazos Valley African American Museum	Bryan	Texas	2006	
	Bronzeville Children's Museum	Chicago	Illinois	1998	
	Buffalo Soldiers National Museum	Houston	Texas	2000	
	California African American Museum	Los Angeles	California	1981	
	Charles H. Wright Museum of African American History	Detroit	Michigan	1965	
	Charlotte Hawkins Brown Museum	Sedalia	North Carolina	1987	
	Clemson Area African American Museum	Clemson	South Carolina	2010	
	Crispus Attucks Museum	Indianapolis	Indiana	1998	
	Delta Cultural Center	Helena	Arkansas	1991	
	Destination Crenshaw	Los Angeles	California	2019	
	Dorchester Academy and Museum	Midway	Georgia	2004	
	Dr. Carter G. Woodson African American History Museum	St. Petersburg	Florida	2006	
	DuSable Museum of African American History	Chicago	Illinois	1960	
	Eddie Mae Herron Center and Museum	Pocahontas	Arkansas	2001	
	Ely Educational Museum	Pompano Beach	Florida	2000	
	Evansville African American Museum	Evansville	Indiana	2007	
	Finding Our Roots African American Museum	Houma	Louisiana	2017	
	Frederick Douglass National Historic Site	Washington	D.C.	1962	
	Freedom House Museum	Alexandria	Virginia	2008	
	Freedom Rides Museum	Montgomery	Alabama	1962	
	George Washington Carver Museum	Tuskegee	Alabama	1941	
	George Washington Carver Museum	Phoenix	Arizona	1980	
	George Washington Carver Museum and Cultural Center	Austin	Texas	1980	
	George Washington Carver National Monument	Newton County	Missouri	1960	
	Great Blacks in Wax Museum	Baltimore	Maryland	1983	
	Great Plains Black History Museum	Omaha	Nebraska	1975	
	Griot Museum of Black History, The	St. Louis	Missouri	1997	
	Hammonds House Museum	Atlanta	Georgia	1988	
	Hampton University Museum	Hampton	Virginia	1988	
	Harriet Tubman Museum	Cape May	New Jersey	2020	
	Harriet Tubman Underground Railroad Visitor Center	Church Creek	Maryland	2017	
	Harvey B. Gantt Center	Charlotte	North Carolina	1974	
	Henderson Institute Historical Museum	Henderson	North Carolina	1986	
	Hotel Metropolitan Museum	Paducah	Kentucky		
	Houston Museum of African American Culture	Houston	Texas	2012	
	Howard County Center of African American Culture	Columbia	Maryland	1987	
	Idaho Black History Museum	Boise	Idaho	1995	
	International African American Museum	Charleston	South Carolina	2023	
	International Civil Rights Center and Museum	Greensboro	North Carolina	2010	
	Jacob Fontaine Religious Museum	Austin	Texas	2004	
	Jim Crow Museum of Racist Memorabilia	Big Rapids	Michigan	1996	
	John Johnson House	Philadelphia	Pennsylvania	1997	
	John E. Rogers African American Cultural Center	Hartford	Connecticut	1991	
	John G. Riley Center/Museum of African American History and Culture	Tallahassee	Florida	1996	
	Josephine School Community Museum	Berryville	Virginia	2003	
	Kansas African-American Museum	Wichita	Kansas	1997	
	L.E. Coleman African-American Museum	Halifax County, Virginia	Virginia	2005	
	LaVilla Museum	Jacksonville	Florida	1999	
	Legacy Museum, The	Montgomery	Alabama	2018	
	Legacy Museum of African American History	Lynchburg	Virginia	2000	
	Lewis H. Latimer House	New York City (Queens)	New York	2004	
	Lincolnville Museum and Cultural Center	St. Augustine	Florida	2005	
	Louis Armstrong House	New York City (Queens)	New York	2003	
	Mariposa Museum & World Cultural Center	Peterborough	New Hampshire	2002	
	Mariposa Museum in Oak Bluffs (Mariposa Museum & World Cultural Center)	Oak Bluffs	Massachusetts	2019	
	Martin Luther King, Jr., National Historic Site Visitors Center	Atlanta	Georgia	1996	
	Mary McLeod Bethune Council House National Historic Site	Washington	D.C.	1979	
	Mary McLeod Bethune Home	Daytona Beach	Florida	1956	(Note: The Mary McLeod Bethune Home is operated as a historic house museum.)
	Mary S. Harrell Black Heritage Museum	New Smyrna Beach	Florida	1999	
	Mayme A. Clayton Library and Museum	Culver City	California	2010	
	McLemore House African-American Museum	Franklin	Tennessee	2002	
	Mississippi Civil Rights Museum	Jackson	Mississippi	2017	
	MoCADA	New York City (Brooklyn)	New York	1999	
	Mosaic Templars Cultural Center	Little Rock	Arkansas	2008	
	Muhammad Ali Center	Louisville	Kentucky	2005	
	Museum of African American History & Abiel Smith School	Boston	Massachusetts	1964	
	Museum of the African Diaspora	San Francisco	California	2005	
	Nash House Museum	Buffalo	New York	2003	
	Natchez Museum of African American History and Culture	Natchez	Mississippi	1991	
	National African American Archives and Museum	Mobile	Alabama	1992	
	National Afro-American Museum and Cultural Center	Wilberforce	Ohio	1987	
	National Center for Civil and Human Rights	Atlanta	Georgia	2014	
	National Center of Afro-American Artists	Roxbury	Massachusetts	1969	
	National Civil Rights Museum	Memphis	Tennessee	1991	
	National Museum of African American History and Culture	Washington	D.C.	2016	
	National Museum of African American Music	Nashville	Tennessee	2013	(Note: The museum was originally named the Museum of African American Art, Music and Culture, but changed its name to reflect a focus solely on music.)
	National Underground Railroad Freedom Center	Cincinnati	Ohio	2004	
	National Voting Rights Museum	Selma	Alabama	1991	
	Negro Leagues Baseball Museum	Kansas City	Missouri	1990	
	Negro Southern League Museum	Birmingham	Alabama	2014	
	New Orleans African American Museum	New Orleans	Louisiana	1988	
	Newsome House Museum and Cultural Center	Newport News	Virginia	1991	
	Niagara Falls Underground Railroad Heritage Center	Niagara Falls	New York	2018	
	Northeast Louisiana Delta African American Heritage Museum	Monroe	Louisiana	1994	
	Northwest African American Museum	Seattle	Washington	2008	
	Odell S. Williams Now And Then African-American Museum	Baton Rouge	Louisiana	2001	
	Old Dillard Museum	Fort Lauderdale	Florida	1995	
	Omenala Griot Afrocentric Teaching Museum	Atlanta	Georgia	1992	
	Oran Z's Black Facts and Wax Museum	Los Angeles	California	2000	
	Paul R. Jones Collection of African American Art	Newark	Delaware	2004	
	Philadelphia Doll Museum	Philadelphia	Pennsylvania	1988	
	Poindexter Village Museum and Cultural Center	Columbus	Ohio	Planned	
	Pope House Museum	Raleigh	North Carolina	2011	
	Portsmouth Colored Community Library Museum	Portsmouth	Virginia	2013	
	Prince George's African American Museum and Cultural Center	North Brentwood	Maryland	2010	
	Ralph Mark Gilbert Civil Rights Museum	Savannah	Georgia	1996	
	Reginald F. Lewis Museum of Maryland African American History & Culture	Baltimore	Maryland	2005	
	River Road African American Museum	Donaldsonville	Louisiana	1994	
	Rosa Parks Museum	Montgomery	Alabama	2000	
	Rural African American Museum	Opelousas	Louisiana	2018	
	Sandy Ground Historical Museum	New York City (Staten Island)	New York	1994	
	Scott Joplin House State Historic Site	St. Louis	Missouri	1983	
	Scottsboro Boys Museum and Cultural Center	Scottsboro	Alabama	2010	
	Slave Haven Underground Railroad Museum	Memphis	Tennessee	1997	
	Slave Mart Museum	Charleston	South Carolina	1938	
	Smith-Robertson Museum and Cultural Center	Jackson	Mississippi	1984	
	Southeastern Regional Black Archives Research Center and Museum	Tallahassee	Florida	1976	
	Spady Cultural Heritage Museum	Delray Beach	Florida	2001	
	Spelman College Museum of Fine Art	Atlanta	Georgia	1996	
	Springfield and Central Illinois African-American History Museum	Springfield	Illinois	2012	
Stiles African American Heritage Center	Stiles African American Heritage Center	Denver	Colorado	1998	
	Studio Museum in Harlem	New York City (Manhattan)	New York	1968	
	Swift Museum	Rogersville	Tennessee	2008	
	Tangipahoa African American Heritage Museum	Hammond	Louisiana	2007	
	Taylor House Museum of Historic Frenchtown	Tallahassee	Florida	2011	
	Tubman African American Museum	Macon	Georgia	1981	
	Tuskegee Airmen National Historic Site	Tuskegee	Alabama	2008	
	Tuskegee Airmen National Museum	Detroit	Michigan	1987	
	Underground Railroad Museum at Belmont Mansion	Philadelphia	Pennsylvania	2007	
	Weeksville Heritage Center	New York City (Brooklyn)	New York	2005	
	Wells' Built Museum	Orlando	Florida	2001	
	Whitney Plantation	St. John the Baptist Parish	Louisiana	2014	
	Willam V. Banks Broadcast Museum	Detroit	Michigan	2017	
	Zion Union Heritage Museum	Hyannis	Massachusetts	2008	
	Zora Neale Hurston Museum of Fine Arts	Eatonville	Florida	2017	
	Minnesota African American Heritage Museum and Gallery	Minneapolis	Minnesota	2018	
	Seek Museum	Russellville	Kentucky	2016	

== See also ==
- African American Museum (disambiguation)
- African-American Heritage Sites
- Museums of the African diaspora

== Bibliography ==
- Alexander, Edward P. (1997). The Museum in America: Innovators and Pioneers. Walnut Creek, Calif.: AltaMira Press. ISBN 9780761989462.
- Burcaw, George Ellis (1997). Introduction to Museum Work. Walnut Creek, Calif.: Altamira Press. ISBN 9780761989257.
- Coleman, Christy (2006). "African American Museums in the Twenty-first Century". In Genoways, Hugh H. (ed.). Museum Philosophy for the Twenty-First Century. Lanham, Md.: Altamira Press. ISBN 9780759107533.
- Curtis, Nancy C. (1996). Black Heritage Sites: An African American Odyssey and Finder's Guide. Chicago: American Library Association. ISBN 9780838906439.
- Dagbovie, Pero Gaglo (2010). African American History Reconsidered. Urbana, Ill.: University of Illinois Press. ISBN 9780252035210.
- Duty, Michael W.; Penn, Elan (2007). Dallas & Fort Worth: A Pictorial Celebration. New York: Sterling Publishing Co. ISBN 9781402725616.
- Evelyn, Douglas E.; Dickson, Paul; Ackerman, S.J. (2008). On This Spot: Pinpointing the Past in Washington, D.C. Sterling, Va.: Capital Books. ISBN 9780918339744.
- Dickerson, Amina J. (1991). "African American Museums and the New Century: Challenges in Leadership". In Tolles, Bryant Franklin; Alexander, Edward P. (eds.). Leadership for the Future: Changing Directorial Roles in American History Museums and Historical Societies: Collected Essays. Nashville: American Association for State and Local History. ISBN 9780942063110.
- Doswell, Raymond (2008). Evaluating Educational Value in Museum Exhibitions: Establishing an Evaluation Process for the Negro Leagues Baseball Museum (Ed.D.). Department of Educational Leadership, Kansas State University. ISBN 9780549598282.
- Holland, Jesse J. (2007). Black Men Built the Capitol: Discovering African-American History In and Around Washington, D.C.. Guilford, Conn.: Globe Pequot Press. ISBN 9780762751921.
- Hornsby, Alton (2011). Black America: A State-By-State Historical Encyclopedia. Volume 1: A—M. Santa Barbara, Calif.: ABC-CLIO. ISBN 9780313341120.
- Huntington, Tom (2006). Ben Franklin's Philadelphia: A Guide. Mechanicsburg, Pa.: Stackpole Books. ISBN 9780811732826.
- Lefever, Harry G.; Page, Michael C. (2008). Sacred Places: A Guide to the Civil Rights Sites in Atlanta, Georgia. Macon, Ga.: Mercer University Press. ISBN 9780881461213.
- Lurie, Maxine N.; Mappen, Mark (2004). Encyclopedia of New Jersey. New Brunswick, N.J.: Rutgers University Press. ISBN 9780813533254.
- Mjagkij, Nina (2001). Organizing Black America: An Encyclopedia of African American Associations. Florence, Ky.: Taylor & Francis. ISBN 9780203801192.
- Pulliam, Ted (2011). Historic Alexandria: An Illustrated History. San Antonio, Tex.: Historical Publishing Network. ISBN 9781935377412.
- Romano, Renee C. (2006). The Civil Rights Movement in American Memory. Athens, Ga.: University of Georgia Press. ISBN 9780820325385.
- Selz, Peter Howard (2006). Art of Engagement: Visual Politics in California and Beyond. Berkeley, Calif.: University of California Press. ISBN 9780520240537.
- Shuman, Robert Baird (2002). Great American Writers, Twentieth Century. Volume 2: Benét—Cather. New York: Marshall Cavendish. ISBN 9780761472407.
- Sisson, Richard (2006). The American Midwest: An Interpretive Encyclopedia. Bloomington, Ind.: Indiana University Press. ISBN 9780253003492.
- Woodford, Arthur M. (2001). This Is Detroit, 1701–2001. Detroit: Wayne State University Press. ISBN 9780814329146.
