= Baker Public School (Richmond, Virginia) =

Historic buildings in Virginia, US

- U.S. National Register of Historic Places
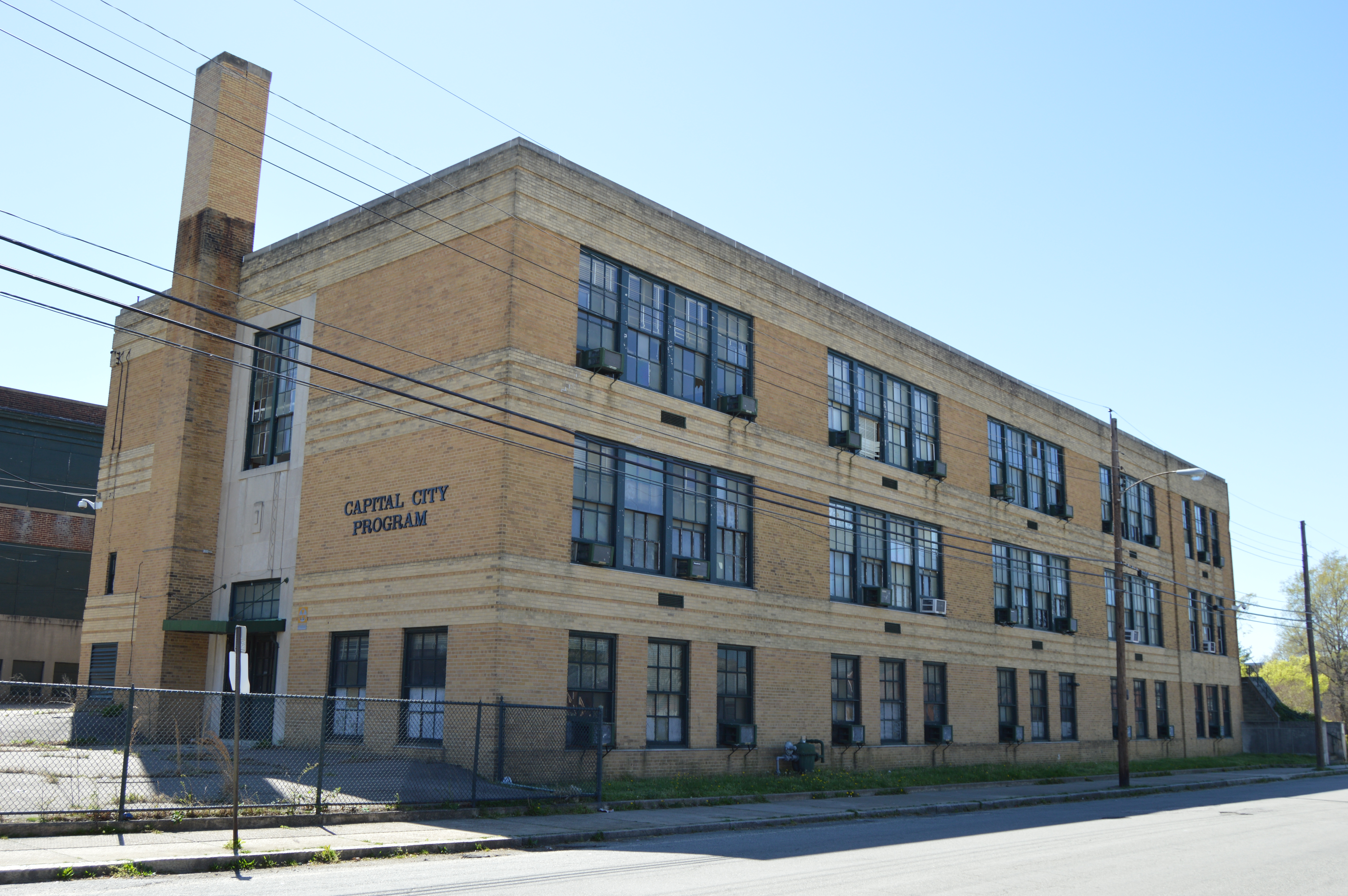

- Location within Virginia Location within the United States
- Location: 100 W. Baker St., Richmond, Virginia
- Coordinates: 37°33′07″N 77°26′18″W
- Area: 1.7 acres (0.69 ha)
- Built: 1913; 1939
- Architectural style: Colonial Revival; Art Deco
- NRHP reference No.: 16000537
- Added to NRHP: August 15, 2016

The Baker Public School is a pair of historic school buildings at 100 West Baker Street in Richmond, Virginia. It consists of a small Colonial Revival brick building constructed in 1913 as an annex to an older (now demolished) building, and a larger 1939 Art Deco building built out of limestone and brick. The latter is in an arrow shape, with its main entrance set at an angle facing the corner West Charity and St. Paul Streets. The school served the African-American neighborhood of Jackson Ward (from which it is now separated by a highway) until 1979.

The school was listed on the National Register of Historic Places in 2016.

== See also ==
- National Register of Historic Places listings in Richmond, Virginia
