= Legacy Museum of African American History =

Museum in Lynchburg, Virginia

- Founded: 1995 as The Legacy Project
- Type: Museum
- Location: Lynchburg, Virginia, US
- Website: legacymuseum.org

The Legacy Museum of African American History was established in 1995 in Lynchburg, Virginia. Its exhibits and permanent collection focus on topics central to African American history, including the historic struggle for civil rights; business and employment; civic and social organizations; entertainment and sports; medicine and health; the Black church; the professions; political life; education; communications; the family, and the arts.

== History ==
The Legacy Project was the name of the organization prior to its acquiring a building for a future museum. It was initially sponsored by the Lynchburg branch of the NAACP.

In 1995 it became incorporated with 501(c) non-profit status. In 1997 the Legacy Project acquired a 100-year-old, dilapidated but once-beautiful house at 403 Monroe Street, Lynchburg. Architect Kelvin Moore was hired to draw up plans to transform the house into a modern museum. A Capital Fundraising Committee was formed to raise $300,000, and a Collections Committee was formed to solicit and archive artifacts for the permanent collection. The Legacy Project became the Legacy Museum of African American History.

Renovation of the historic building that is the museum's home began in March 1999. On June 25, 2000 a celebratory dedication and grand opening was held. Dr. Vivian Pinn, Director of the Office of Research on Women's Health at the National Institutes of Health, gave the opening address. The ribbon was cut by civil rights pioneer Drucilla Moultrie and historian Harry Ferguson, both in their 90s, and six-year-old Ashley Lewis.

Since 2006, the museum has worked with the Virginia Foundation for the Humanities and five other central Virginia museums to share ideas about programs and staff development.

== Mission ==
The mission of the museum is "to collect, preserve and store historical artifacts, documents and memorabilia relating to significant contributions of the African American Community in Lynchburg and its environs."

== Logo ==
The logo of the museum is the Sankofa, a symbol used by the Akan people of West Africa. It means "return and take from the past that which may have been forgotten in the past but which will be of use today and in the future." In Ghana the Sankofa is stamped on textiles and carved on ceremonial objects and tools.

== See also ==
- List of museums focused on African Americans
