= Natchez Museum of African American History and Culture =

Museum in Mississippi, USA

Coordinates: 31.5610°N 91.4040°W

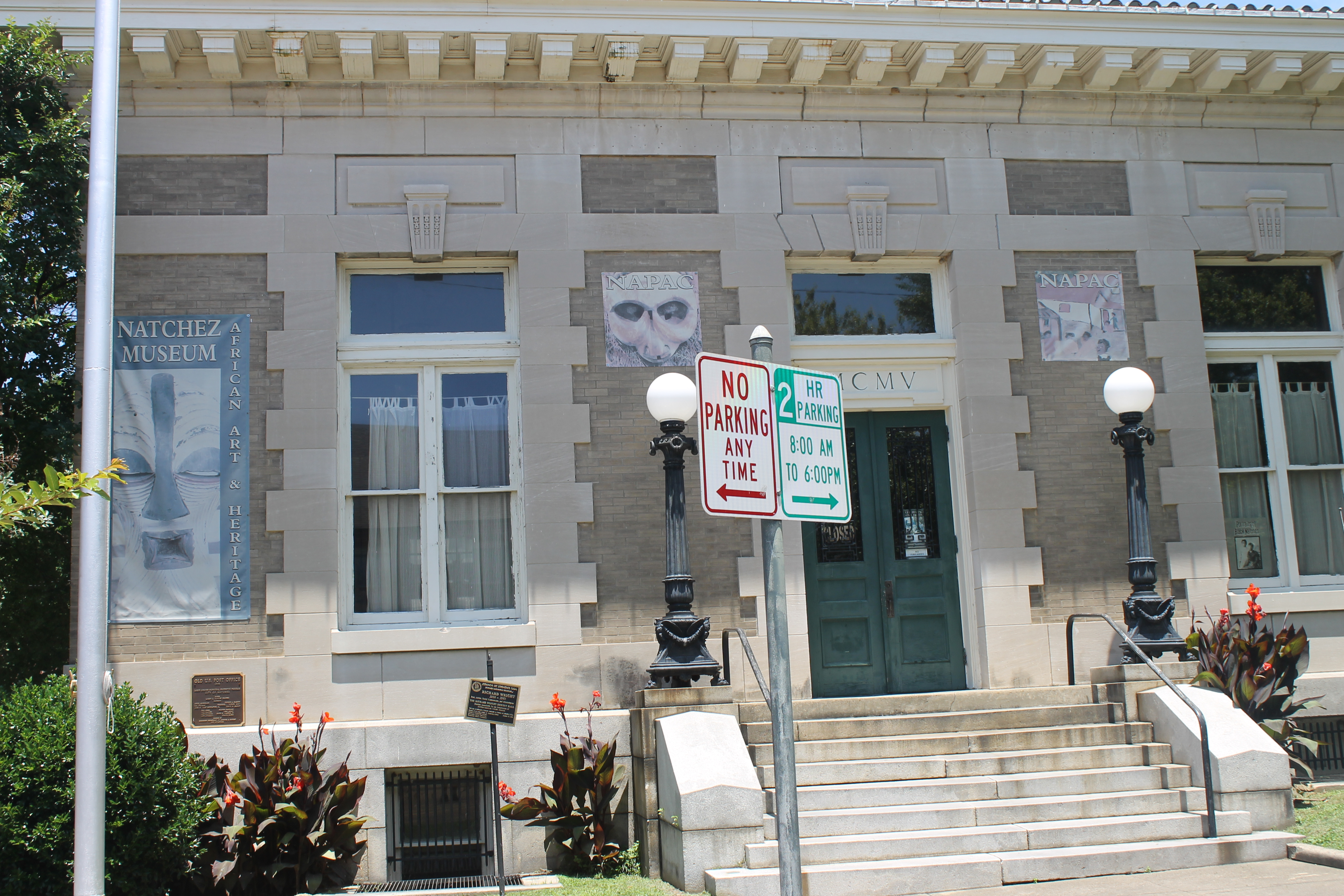
- Natchez Museum of African American History and Culture
- Established: 1991
- Location: 301 Main Street, Natchez, MS, United States
- Director: Bobby L Dennis

The Natchez Museum of African American History and Culture is a museum located in Natchez, MS, United States. The museum chronicles the history and culture of African Americans in the southern United States. The museum opened in 1991 by the Natchez Association for the Preservation of African American Culture (NAPAC), an organization dedicated to exploring the societal contributions of people of African origin and descent.

== Building ==
The museum is located in a historic building in Natchez, Mississippi, the former United States Post Office, built around 1904. The museum and its exhibits occupy approximately 10,000 square feet.

== Exhibits ==
The museum showcases events starting with the incorporation of the City of Natchez in 1716 to the present, using art, photographs, manuscripts, artifacts, and books. Exhibits cover the era of slavery, the Civil War, Reconstruction, 20th Century wars and the Civil rights era. They include Forks of the Road, which was the second largest slave market in the southern United States, and which has received international recognition by the United Nations because of its role in the international slave trade; also known for the famed enslaved Prince Abdul Rahman Ibrahima ibn Sori, The Rhythm Nightclub fire, where over 200 African American Natchez citizens died; an exhibit dedicated to the literary works of critically acclaimed author Richard Wright, a Natchez native. The museum also hosts educational events and presentations.

In February 2016, as part of its participation in Black History Month events, the museum held its inaugural Natchez Hip Hop Summit, with Hip hop music performances and a panel discussion on hip hop in relation to racial identity.

In February 2022, the museum opened a new permanent exhibit honoring the life of Daisy C. Newman, an African American soprano soloist and music educator who earned the nickname "Black Butterfly" for her portrayal of Cio-Cio San in the opera "Madame Butterfly". Newman was born in Natchez in 1947 and died in 2021. She performed on stages worldwide and was nominated for a Tony Award for her performance in "Porgy and Bess". The exhibit features a portrait of Newman, donated to the museum by her sister, Dorothy Hills, along with videos of Newman's performances. The museum's executive director, Bobby Dennis, said "I knew Ms. Newman. Her talent and accolades went far beyond Mississippi. Her acclaim was international".

== Education ==
The museum has hosted educational programs for visiting students. Staff have also contributed to educational events, such as the Black and Blue Civil War Living History Program, where museum Executive Director Darrell S. White portrayed Hiram Revels, a freedman who during the Civil War helped to raise two African-American regiments and later became the first African American to serve as a senator from Mississippi in the United States Congress, and also portrayed Wilson Brown, an escaped enslaved man who joined the United States Navy, and was eventually awarded the Medal of Honor, the highest American military decoration, for his heroism on the USS Hartford during the Battle of Mobile Bay in August 1864.

== See also ==
- List of museums focused on African Americans
