= George Washington Carver Museum and Cultural Center =

- U.S. National Register of Historic Places
- Recorded Texas Historic Landmark
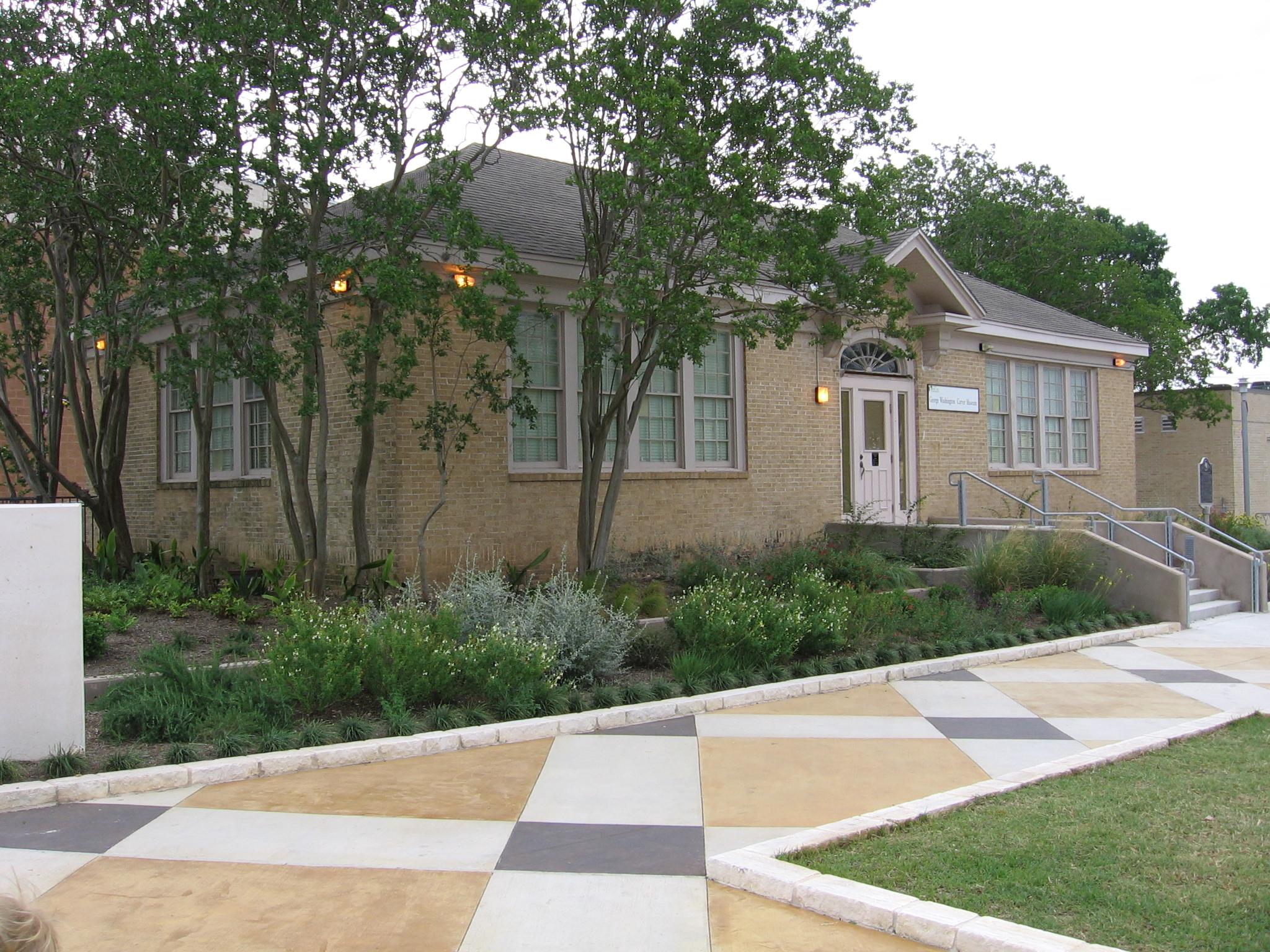
- Location: 1165 Angelina St; Austin, Texas, USA
- Coordinates: 30°16′11.64″N 97°43′27.48″W
- Built: 1926
- MPS: East Austin MRA
- NRHP reference No.: 05000241
- RTHL No.: 14088

Significant dates
- Added to NRHP: March 30, 2005
- Designated RTHL: 1977

The George Washington Carver Museum and Cultural Center is a museum and cultural center in east Austin, Texas, housed in the former George Washington Carver branch of the Austin Public Library. Named in honor of George Washington Carver, the facility has been listed on the National Register of Historic Places since 2005.

== History ==
The small, wood-frame building was constructed in 1926 on the corner of Ninth and Guadalupe Streets. When it was replaced by a larger stone structure in 1933, the building was moved to the east side of town, on Angelina Street, to serve the African-American Community. It was known for many years as the "Colored Branch." In 1947, the building was renamed the George Washington Carver Library in honor of the famous inventor and scientist. The library served African-Americans and others in the community until 1979 when a new, modern library building was completed next door. At that time work began to convert the building to a cultural center. The museum opened on October 24, 1980, and was expanded with a new facility in 2001.

The original Colonial Revival style building was added to the National Register of Historic Places in 2005.

== Juneteenth Memorial Monument ==
The Juneteenth Exhibit is the core of the George Washington Carver Museum, Cultural, and Genealogy Center's permanent exhibits. The displays and information provided help visitors understand the significance of freedom to formerly enslaved African Americans. Multimedia presentations introduce students to the earliest and present-day Juneteenth celebrations. It also provides the opportunity to learn about Texas’ participation in the Civil War, the history of the celebration, why the holiday is significant for all Americans, as well as contrasting and comparing early commemorations and modern day activities.

The Juneteenth Memorial Sculpture Monument opened to the public on June 27, 2015. It is made up of 5 bronze figures that represent the story of Juneteenth and a paved timeline of the Black Presence in the Americas—from the Middle Passage to the Emancipation Proclamation that leads to the Bell of Freedom.

The Juneteenth Sculptures were created by Adrienne Rison Isom and Eddie Dixon. Isom, a native Austinite, created 3 of the sculpture pieces—Freed Man & Freed Woman, and Child (the girl figure). And Dixon created the remaining work—Law Maker and Pastor.

The sculptures show how the news of freedom spread. Juneteenth began on June 19, 1865, with an order read by General Gordon Grainger—a law that the Emancipation Proclamation was enforced. So Legislature learned of freedom first, then the news reached The Pastor (who represents the faith leader in African American Community). The Pastor told the enslaved people represented by the Freed Man and Freed Woman, and they shared the news with youth—the Child figure. The blank pedestal is where visitors can stand and be a part of the piece and continue the Juneteenth Story—to remember, to reflect, and to be inspired to share the emancipation story with others.

== See also ==
- List of museums focused on African Americans
