= African-American neighborhood =

Type of ethnic enclaves found in many cities in the United States

African-American neighborhoods or black neighborhoods are types of ethnic enclaves found in many cities in the United States. Generally, an African American neighborhood is one where the majority of the people who live there are African American. Some of the earliest African-American neighborhoods were in New Orleans, Mobile, Atlanta, and other cities throughout the American South, as well as in New York City. In 1830, there were 14,000 "Free negroes" living in New York City.

The formation of Black neighborhoods is closely linked to the history of segregation in the United States, either through formal laws or as a product of social norms. Black neighborhoods have played an important role in the development of African-American culture. Some neighborhoods endured violent attacks.

Black residential segregation has been declining in the United States and many Black people are moving to white suburbs. Black people continue to live in poorer neighborhoods than white people and Americans of other races.

African-American neighborhoods are more likely to have higher poverty rates. African-American neighborhoods also have higher homicide rates. In addition, African-American neighborhoods also experience poor funding for resources such as vital infrastructures, lower economic growth, higher health issues and environmental racism from historical redlining.

== History ==
African American neighborhoods originated from segregation. Slavery had shaped housing options for blacks. Blacks and sometimes Jews, Asians, and Latinos were barred from white neighborhoods.

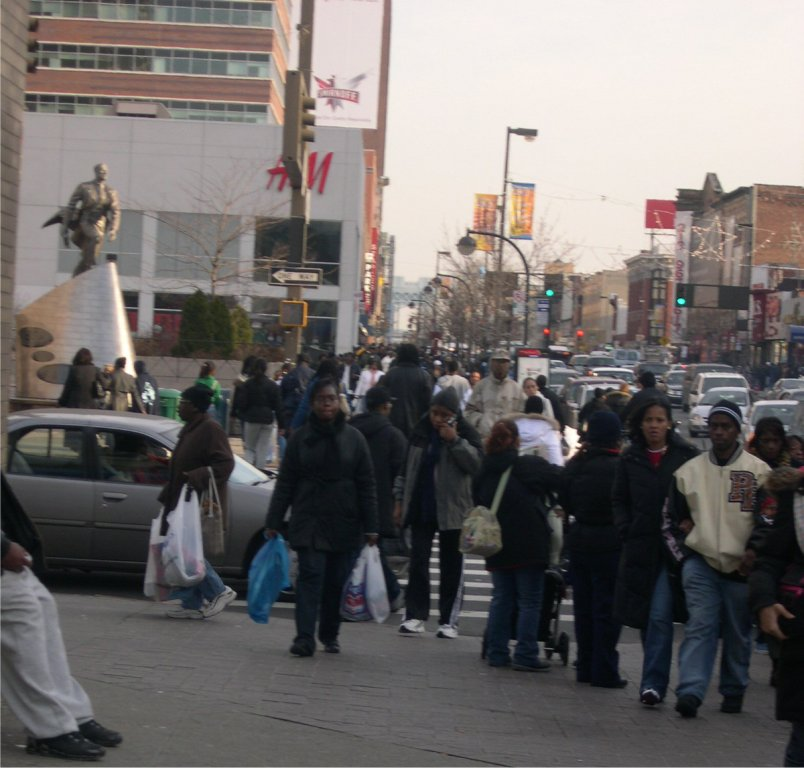
Shopping on 125th Street, in New York City's Harlem, the city's historic Black neighborhood.

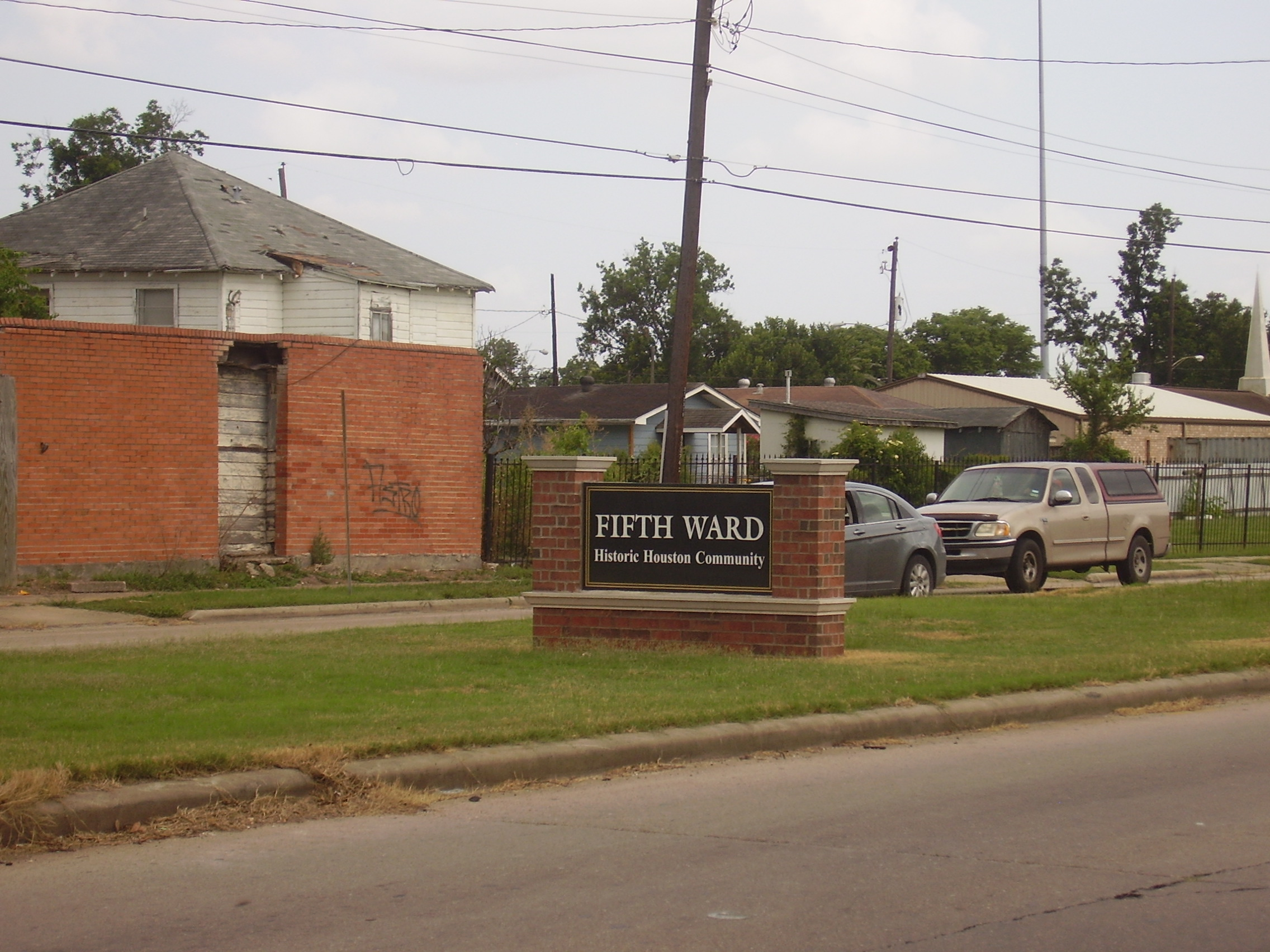
Houston's The Fifth Ward is a predominantly African American neighborhood in the city of Houston.

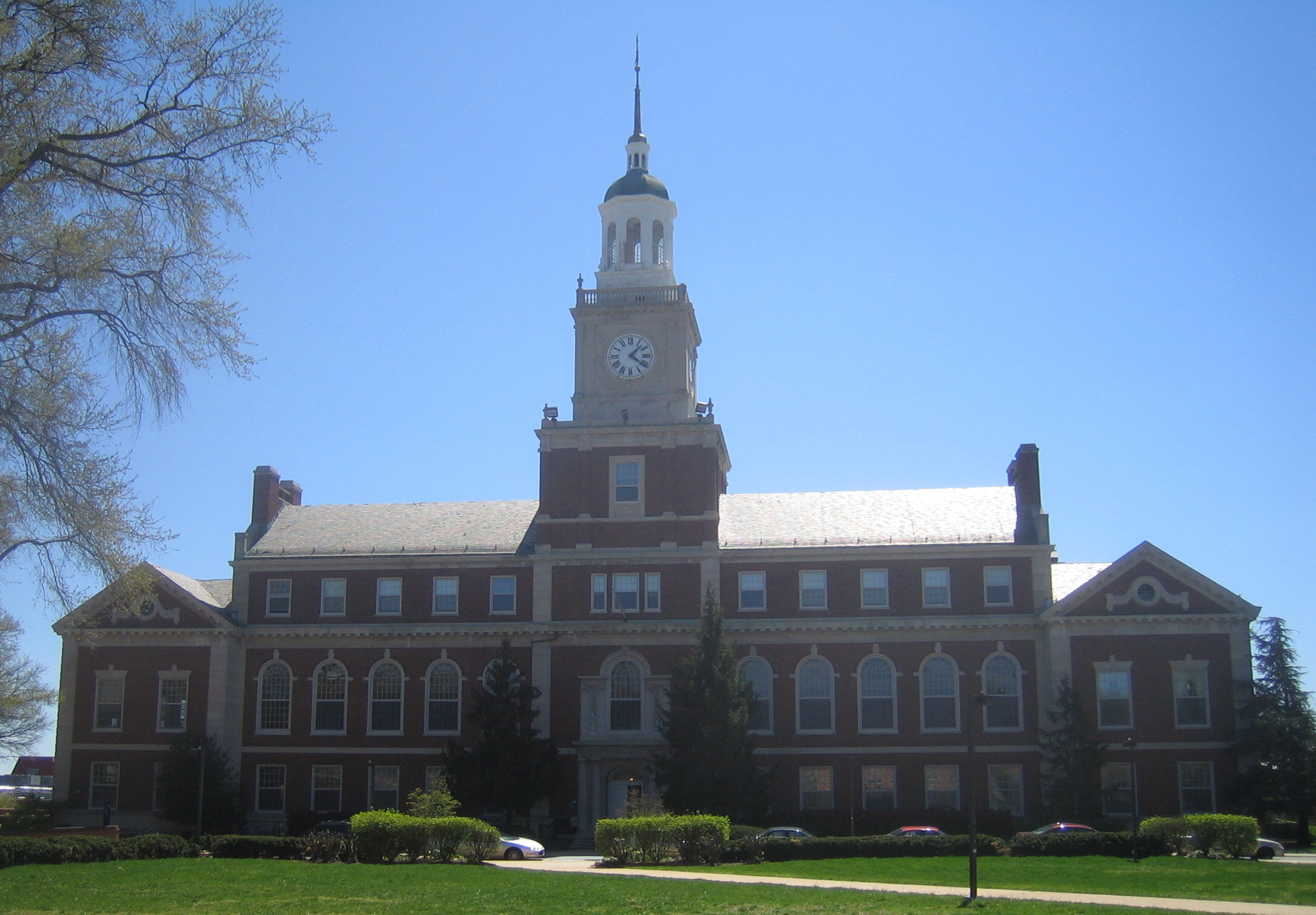
The Founder's Library at Howard University is located in Washington D.C.'s U Street historic Black neighborhood.

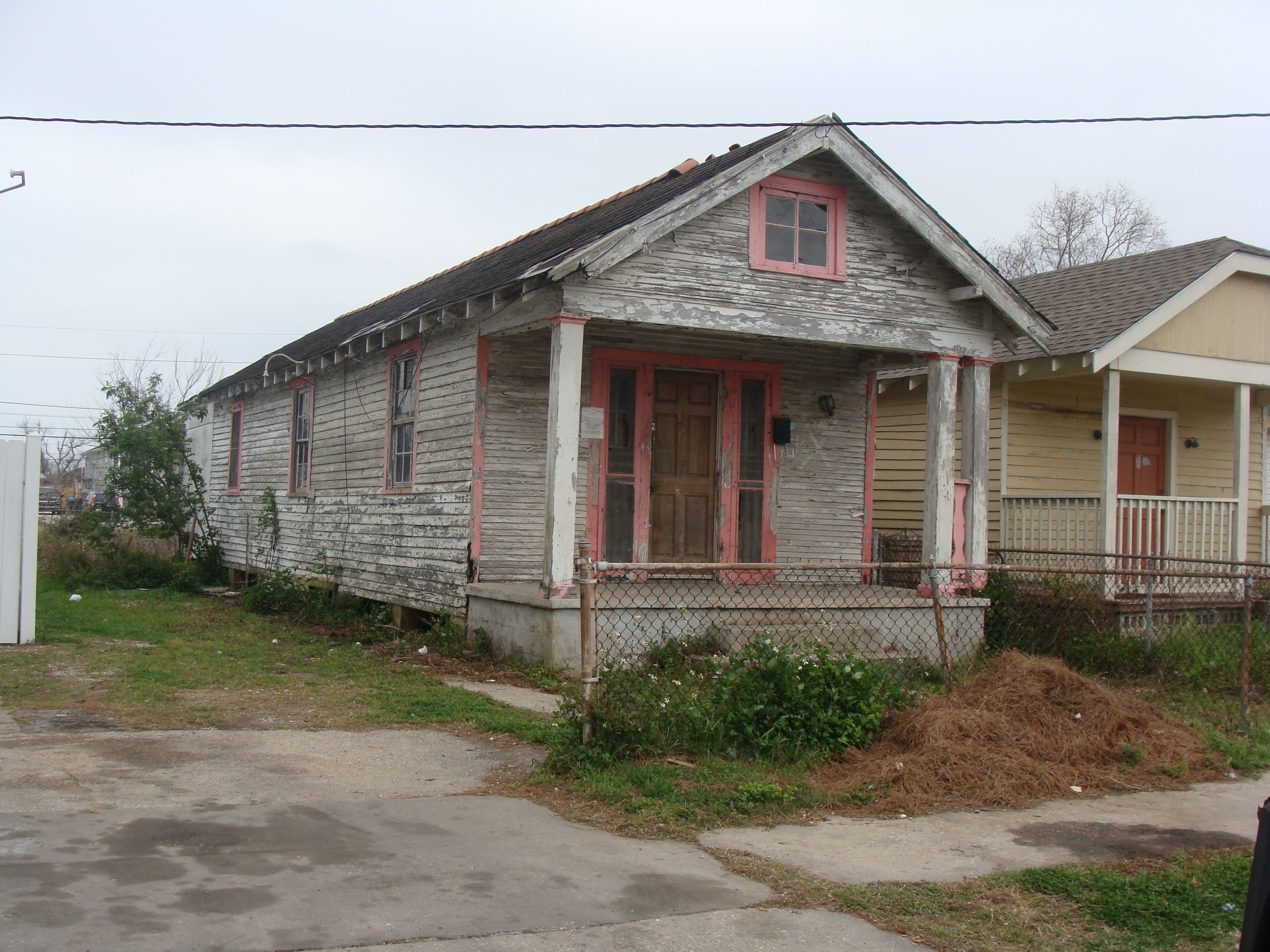
New Orleans' Lower 9th Ward, is a well-known Black neighborhood famously damaged by Hurricane Katrina in 2005.

African Americans and Mexican Americans were put in less desirable neighborhoods due to redlining and white supremacy. This racist legacy due to white people has left African Americans to still live in poor neighborhoods and lack quality housing.

=== The Great Migration ===
The Great Migration was the movement of more than one million African Americans out of rural Southern United States from 1914 to 1940. Most African Americans who participated in the migration moved to large industrial cities such as New York City, Chicago, Philadelphia, Detroit, Cincinnati, Cleveland, St. Louis, Kansas City, Missouri, Boston, Baltimore, Pittsburgh, Los Angeles, Washington, D.C., Minneapolis, New Orleans, Milwaukee, Oakland, and Long Beach as well as many smaller industrial cities. Hence, the Migration played an important role in the formation and expansion of African-American neighborhoods in these cities. Chicago's South Side and adjoining South Suburbs together constitute the largest geographical predominantly Black region in America, stretching from roughly Cermak Road (22nd St) on the north in the Near South Side to the far south suburb of University Park - a distance of approximately 40 miles. There are various races and ethnic groups in this huge expanse such as Whites, Latinos, Asians, and Arabs, but it is predominantly Black.

While the Great Migration helped educated African Americans obtain jobs, while enabling a measure of class mobility, the migrants encountered significant forms of discrimination in the North through a large migration during such a short of period of time. The African-American migrants were often resented by working classes in the North, who feared that their ability to negotiate rates of pay, or even to secure employment at all, was threatened by the influx of new labor competition.

Populations increased very rapidly with the addition of African-American migrants and new European immigrants, which caused widespread housing shortages in many cities. Newer groups competed even for the oldest and most rundown houses because the poorly constructed houses were what they could afford. African Americans competed for work and housing with first or second generation immigrants in many major cities. Ethnic groups created territories which they defended against change. More established populations with more capital moved away to newer housing that was being developed on the outskirts of the cities, to get away from the pressure of new groups of residents.

The migrants also discovered that the open discrimination of the South was only more subtly manifested in the North. In 1917, the Supreme Court declared municipal resident segregation ordinances unconstitutional. In response, some white groups resorted to the restrictive covenant, a formal deed restriction binding property owners in a given neighborhood not to sell to blacks. Whites who broke these agreements could be sued by "damaged" neighbors. Not until 1948 did the Supreme Court strike down restrictive covenants. The National Housing Act of 1934 contributed to limiting the availability of loans to urban areas, particularly those areas inhabited by African Americans. In Chicago's North Side, property owners of Chicago Uptown Association in 1931 listed the 4600 block of North Winthrop Avenue as the only block where African Americans could live.

In some cities, the influx of African-American migrants as well as other immigrants resulted in racial violence, which flared in several cities during 1919.

This significant event and the subsequent struggle of African-American migrants to adapt to Northern cities was the subject of Jacob Lawrence's Migration Series. This series, exhibited in 1941, was responsible for bringing Lawrence to the public eye as one of the most important African-American artists of the time.

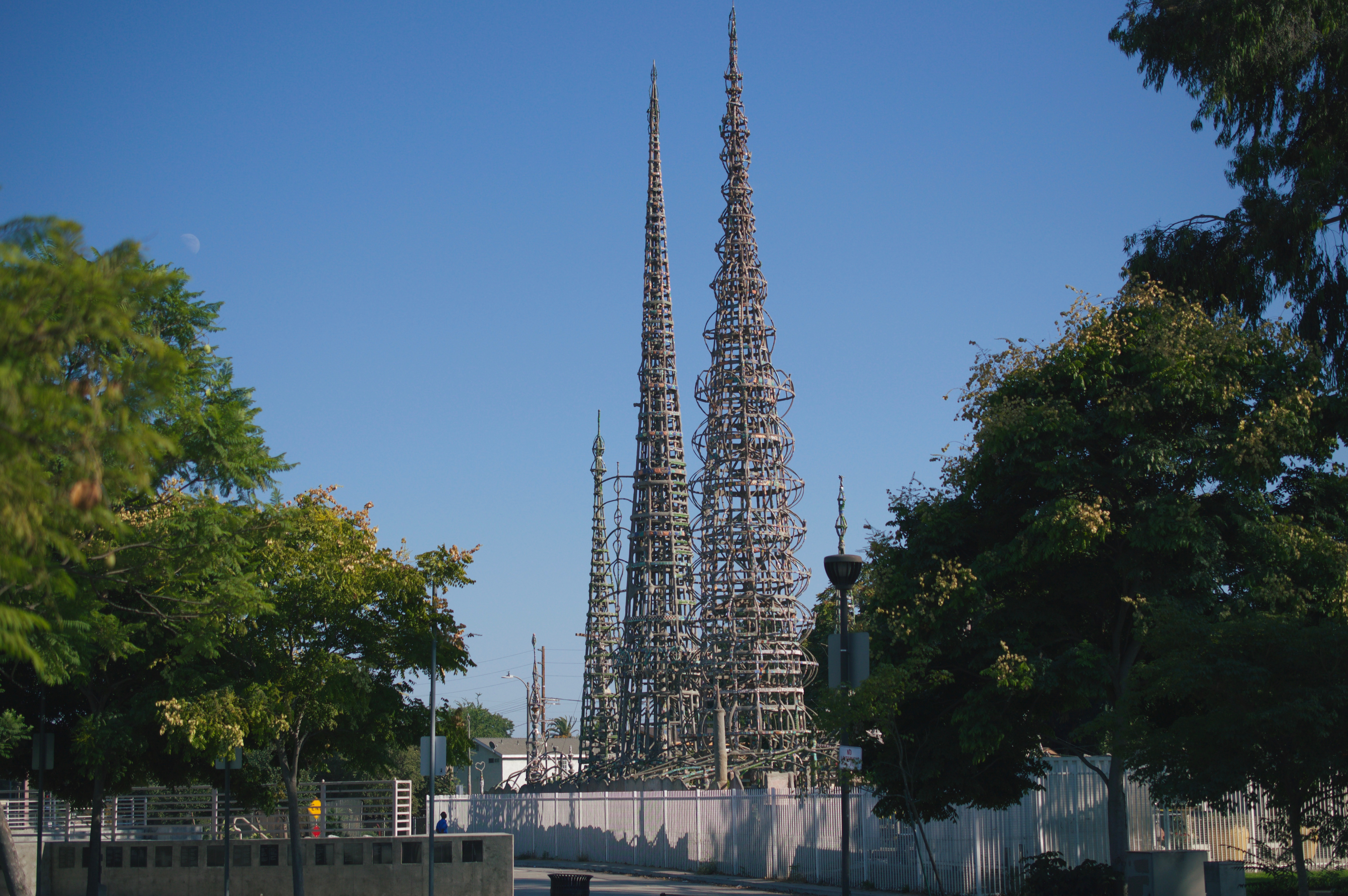
The landmarked interconnected sculptural towers known as the Watts Towers are located in Los Angeles' Watts neighborhood.

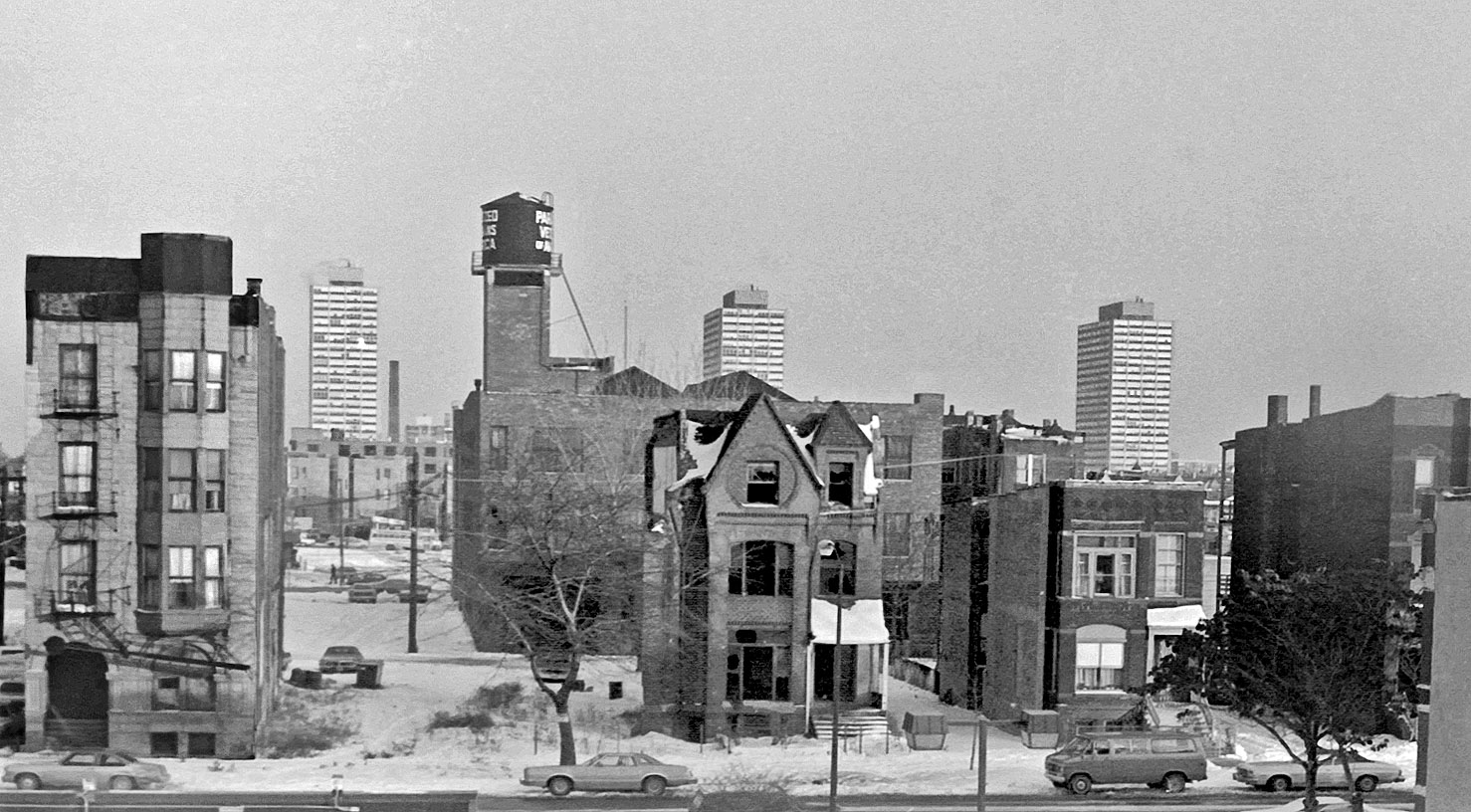
The South Side of Chicago is a 48.3% Black and now diverse and contains Chicago’s Black Belt, and the South Side was once known for being disadvantaged, and for its most famous daughter, Michelle Obama, Pullman Historic Site, and the University of Chicago .

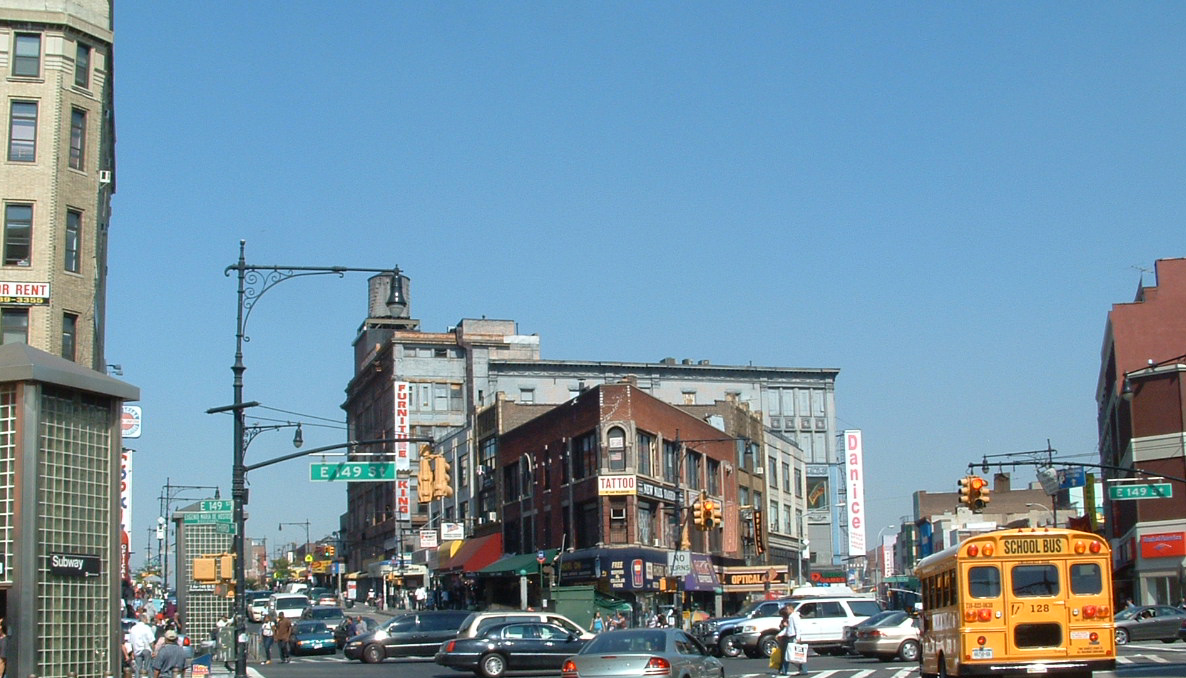
The Hub is the retail heart of the South Bronx, New York City. Between 1900 and 1930, the number of Bronx residents increased from 201,000 to 1,265,000.

=== The Second Great Migration ===
From 1940 to 1970, another five million people left the South for industrial jobs in cities of the North and West. Sometimes violence was the outcome of some of the pressure of this migration.

In response to the influx of Blacks from the South, banks, insurance companies, and businesses began redlining—denying or increasing the cost of services, such as banking, insurance, access to jobs, access to health care, or even supermarkets to residents in certain, often racially determined, areas. The most common use of the term refers to mortgage discrimination. Data on house prices and attitudes toward integration suggest that in the mid-20th century, segregation was a product of collective actions taken by whites to exclude blacks from their neighborhoods. This meant that ethnic minorities could secure mortgage loans only in certain areas, and it resulted in a large increase in the residential racial segregation and urban decay in the United States.

Urban renewal, the redevelopment of areas within large cities, including white flight, has also been a factor in the growth patterns of African-American neighborhoods. The process began an intense phase in the late 1940s and continues in some places to the present day. It has had a major impact on the urban landscape. Urban renewal was extremely controversial because it involved the destruction of businesses, the relocation of people, and the use of eminent domain to reclaim private property for city-initiated development projects. The justifications often used for urban renewal include the "renewal" of residential slums blighted commercial and industrial areas. In the second half of the 20th century, renewal often resulted in the creation of urban sprawl and vast areas of cities being demolished and replaced by freeways and expressways, housing projects, and vacant lots, some of which still remain vacant at the beginning of the 21st century. Urban renewal had a disproportionate and largely negative impact on African-American neighborhoods. In the 1960s James Baldwin famously dubbed urban renewal "Negro Removal".

The creation of highways in some cases divided and isolated black neighborhoods from goods and services, many times within industrial corridors. For example, Birmingham's interstate highway system attempted to maintain racial boundaries established by the city's 1926 racially based zoning law. The construction of interstate highways through Black neighborhoods in the city led to significant population loss in those neighborhoods. It was also associated with an increase in neighborhood racial segregation.

The riots that swept cities across the country from 1964 to 1968 damaged or destroyed additional areas of major cities, for instance Detroit's 12th Street, the U and H street corridors in Washington, DC, and Harlem in New York City during the Harlem Riots. In 1968, the Civil Rights Act removed racial deed restrictions on housing. This enabled middle-class African Americans to move to better housing, in some cases in the suburbs, and to desegregated residential neighborhoods. In some areas, however, real estate agents continued to steer African Americans to particular areas although that was now illegal.

=== Late 20th century ===
By 1990, the legal barriers enforcing segregation had been replaced by decentralized or systemic racism, where whites pay more to live in predominantly white areas. Some social scientists suggest that the historical processes of suburbanization and decentralization are instances of white privilege that have contributed to contemporary patterns of environmental racism.

At the same time, however, middle-class and upper-class Black people have also paid more to live in the suburbs and have left the inner cities of former industrial powerhouses behind. In the New Great Migration, Black college graduates are returning to the South for jobs, where they generally settle in middle-class, suburban areas. This includes states such as Texas, Georgia, and Maryland, three of the biggest gaining states of college graduates.

The New Great Migration is not evenly distributed throughout the South. The rise in net gain points to Atlanta, Charlotte, Dallas, and Houston being a growing hot spots for the migrants of The New Great Migration. The percentage of Black Americans who live in the South has been increasing since 1990, and the biggest gains have been in the region's large urban areas, according to census data. The Black population of metro Atlanta more than doubled between 1990 and 2020, surpassing 2 million in the most recent census. The Black population also more than doubled in metro Charlotte while Greater Houston and Dallas-Fort Worth both saw their Black populations surpass 1 million for the first time. Several smaller metro areas also saw sizable gains, including San Antonio; Raleigh and Greensboro, N.C.; and Orlando. Primary destinations are states that have the most job opportunities, especially Georgia, North Carolina, Maryland, Virginia, Tennessee, Florida and Texas. Other southern states, including Mississippi, Louisiana, South Carolina, Alabama and Arkansas, have seen little net growth in the African American population from return migration.

== Contemporary ==
Despite these pervasive patterns, many changes for individual areas are minor. Decades after the civil rights era, residential segregation in the United States continues to play a major role in the location and quality of Black and white neighborhoods. Despite these pervasive patterns, many changes for individual areas are minor. Cities throughout history have had distinct ethnic districts. However, the African-American districts in U.S. cities are often marked by significant isolation and poverty, a characteristic that distinguishes them from other ethnic neighborhoods.

=== Black middle class and white-collar areas ===
See Gentrification in the United States for development and gentrification of Black neighborhoods

The Civil Rights Movement empowered many historically black religious and educational institutions, creating a growing class of Black middle- and upper-class professionals who drive the social and political activism of the African-American community. This has helped produce majority Black populations with significant middle to upper class Black neighborhoods. Many of these communities are found in the Maryland suburbs of Washington, D.C., and Baltimore, MD as well as the suburbs of Atlanta, GA, and scattered around the country such as Cedar Hill, Texas, Oak Park, Michigan, and LaPlace, Louisiana. The residents of these communities are highly educated and work in white-collar professional jobs. Such communities have also developed in many of the larger cities of the United States. Even some of those that traditionally have high poverty and unemployment have also had neighborhoods with middle class and affluent Blacks. Cities' policies of gentrification, the process of renovating a district so that it conforms to middle-class taste, have also played a factor.

=== Ghettos ===
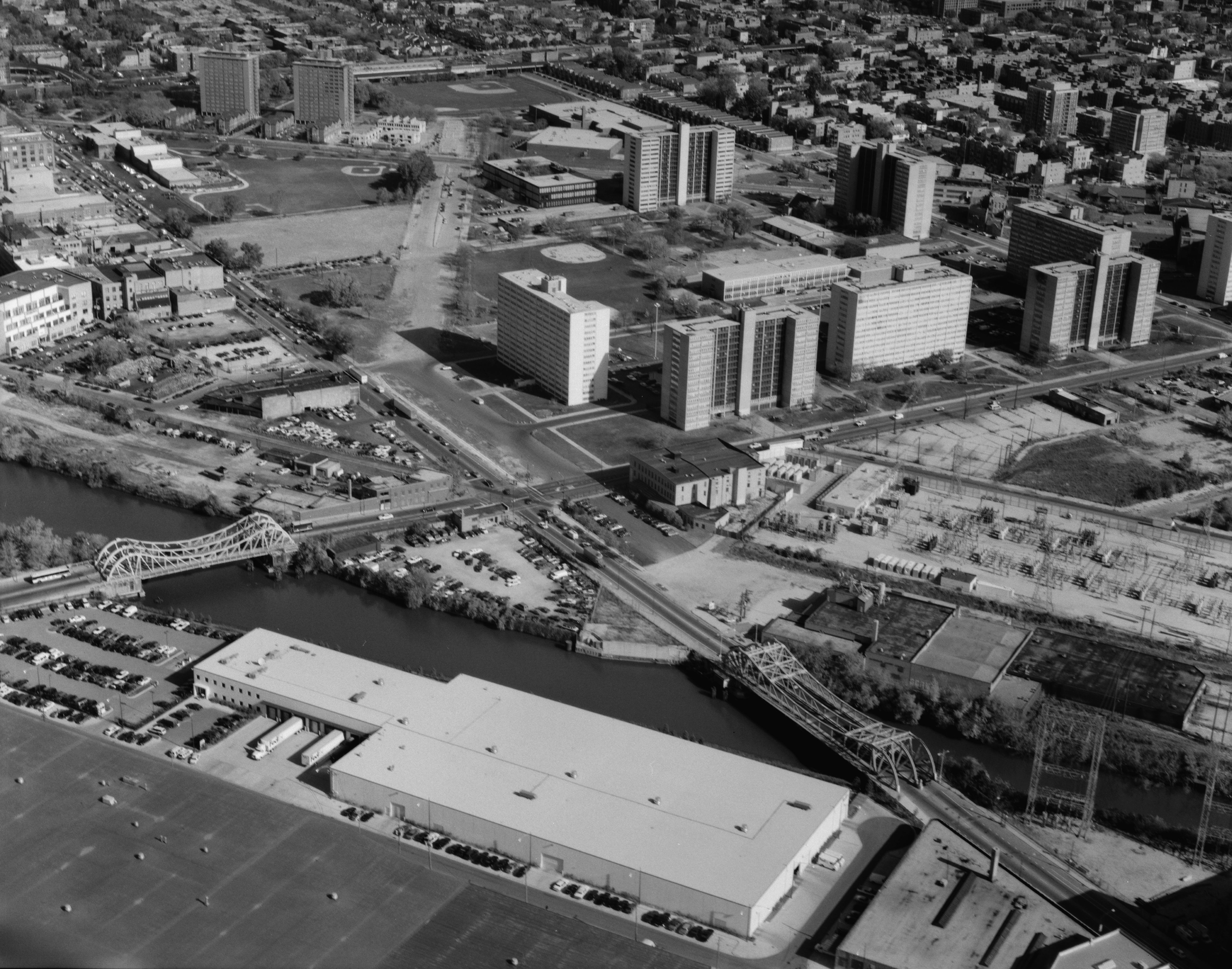
Chicago's Cabrini Green Housing Project, photographed in 1999, was infamous for the poor living conditions and lack of safety suffered by its residents.

Racial segregation in the United States is most pronounced in housing. Although people of different races may work together, they are still unlikely to live in largely integrated neighborhoods. This pattern differs only by degree in different metropolitan areas.

Due to segregated conditions and widespread poverty, some Black neighborhoods in the United States have been called "the ghetto" or "the projects." The use of this term is controversial and, depending on the context, potentially offensive. Despite mainstream America's use of the term "ghetto" to signify a poor urban area (predominantly African-Americans), those living in the area often used it to signify something positive.

The Black ghettos did not always contain dilapidated houses and deteriorating projects, nor were all of its residents poverty-stricken. For many African Americans, the ghetto was "home", a place representing authentic African American culture and a feeling, passion, or emotion derived from the rising above the struggle and suffering of being Black in America. Langston Hughes relays in the "Negro Ghetto" (1931) and "The Heart of Harlem" (1945): "The buildings in Harlem are brick and stone/And the streets are long and wide,/But Harlem's much more than these alone,/Harlem is what's inside." Playwright August Wilson used the term "ghetto" in Ma Rainey's Black Bottom (1984) and Fences (1987), both of which draw upon the author's experience growing up in the Hill District of Pittsburgh, first a neighborhood of early European immigrants, then a black ghetto. Depending on the context and social circles, the term 'ghetto' or 'hood' (short for neighborhood) can be a term of endearment for where the individual person has been brought up or lives.

== Institutions within Black neighborhoods ==
Although some Black neighborhoods may suffer from civic disinvestment, with schools assumed to be of lower quality due to some schools showing lower test scores, less effective policing and fire protection, there are institutions that help to improve the physical and social capital of Black neighborhoods. And with the social mobility of many African Americans, there has been the rise of many communities with better schools and safe neighborhoods. But these issues may be more due to economics than race since middle class blacks with middle-class neighborhoods tend to live in better neighborhoods and children attend better schools than those from lower income neighborhoods or schools districts.

=== Churches ===
In Black neighborhoods the churches have been important sources of social cohesion and activism. For some African Americans, the kind of spirituality learned through these churches works as a protective factor against the corrosive forces of racism. Churches may also do work to improve the physical infrastructure of the neighborhood. Churches in Harlem have undertaken real estate ventures and renovated burnt-out and abandoned brownstones to create new housing for residents. Churches have fought for the right to operate their own schools in place of the often inadequate public schools found in many Black neighborhoods.

=== Museums ===
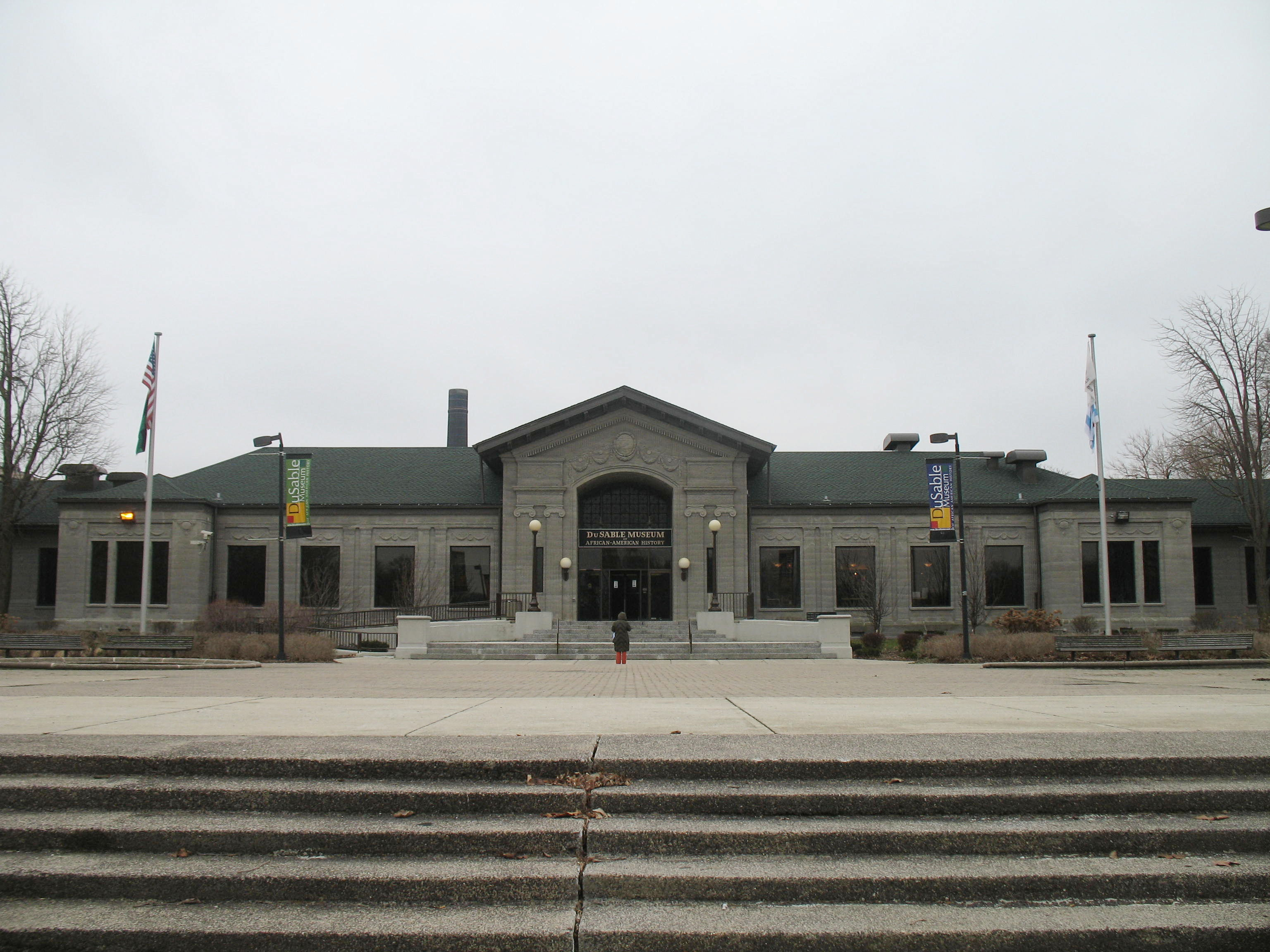
DuSable Museum, Washington Park, Chicago.

The African American Museum Movement emerged during the 1950s and 1960s to preserve the heritage of the lack experience and to ensure its proper interpretation in American history. Museums devoted to African American history are found in many black neighborhoods. Institutions such as the African American Museum and Library at Oakland, the Charles H. Wright Museum of African American History in Detroit, DuSable Museum in Chicago, and The African American Museum in Cleveland were created by African Americans to teach and investigate cultural history that, until recent decades was primarily preserved through oral traditions.

=== Theatre and arts ===
Major movements in literature, music, and the arts have their roots in African American neighborhoods: Blues, Gospel, Jazz, Soul, Rap, House, Hip hop, Rock 'n' roll and others. Cities were the places where young artists could meet and study with other artists and receive recognition, as did Jacob Lawrence when his "Migration Series" was featured by the Museum of Modern Art in New York when he was still in his 20s.

African American neighborhoods have also generated African American theater and numerous dance companies in a variety of styles. After his career as a classical ballet dancer with the New York City Ballet, Arthur Mitchell founded a school and dance company in Harlem. Alvin Ailey created dances out of the African American experience with his Alvin Ailey Dance Company.

Chicago stepping is a name given to a dance that was created in Chicago's predominantly African American neighborhoods. House music, a form of Electronic Dance Music was first developed in Chicago in the early 1980s. By the 1990s, it had spread both nationally and globally.

Hip hop is both a cultural movement and a music genre developed in New York City starting in the late 1970s predominantly by African Americans. Since first emerging in the South Bronx and Bedford-Stuyvesant, the lifestyle of rap/hip hop has spread globally.

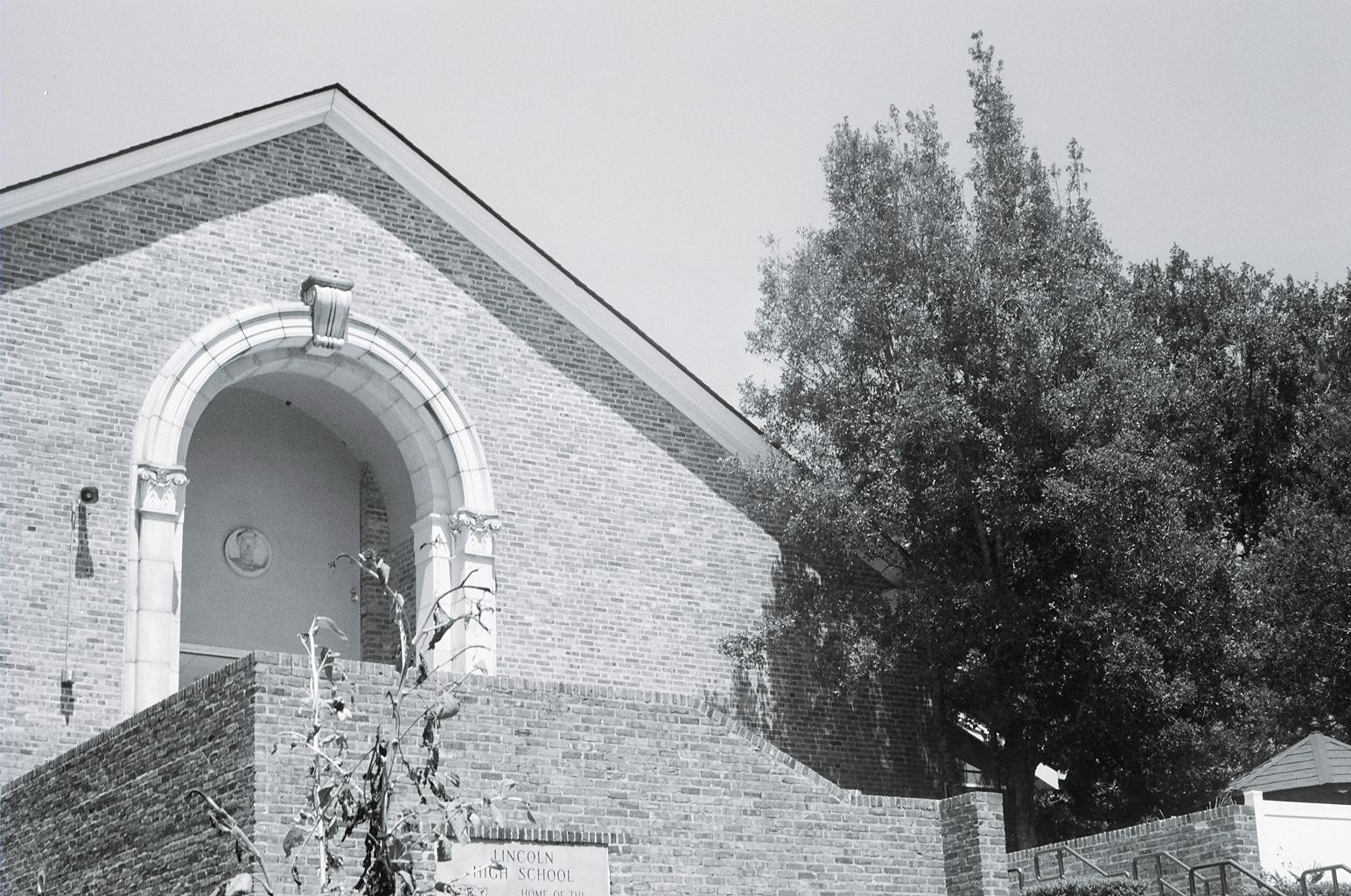
Lincoln Academy was the first school for African Americans in Tallahassee, Florida.

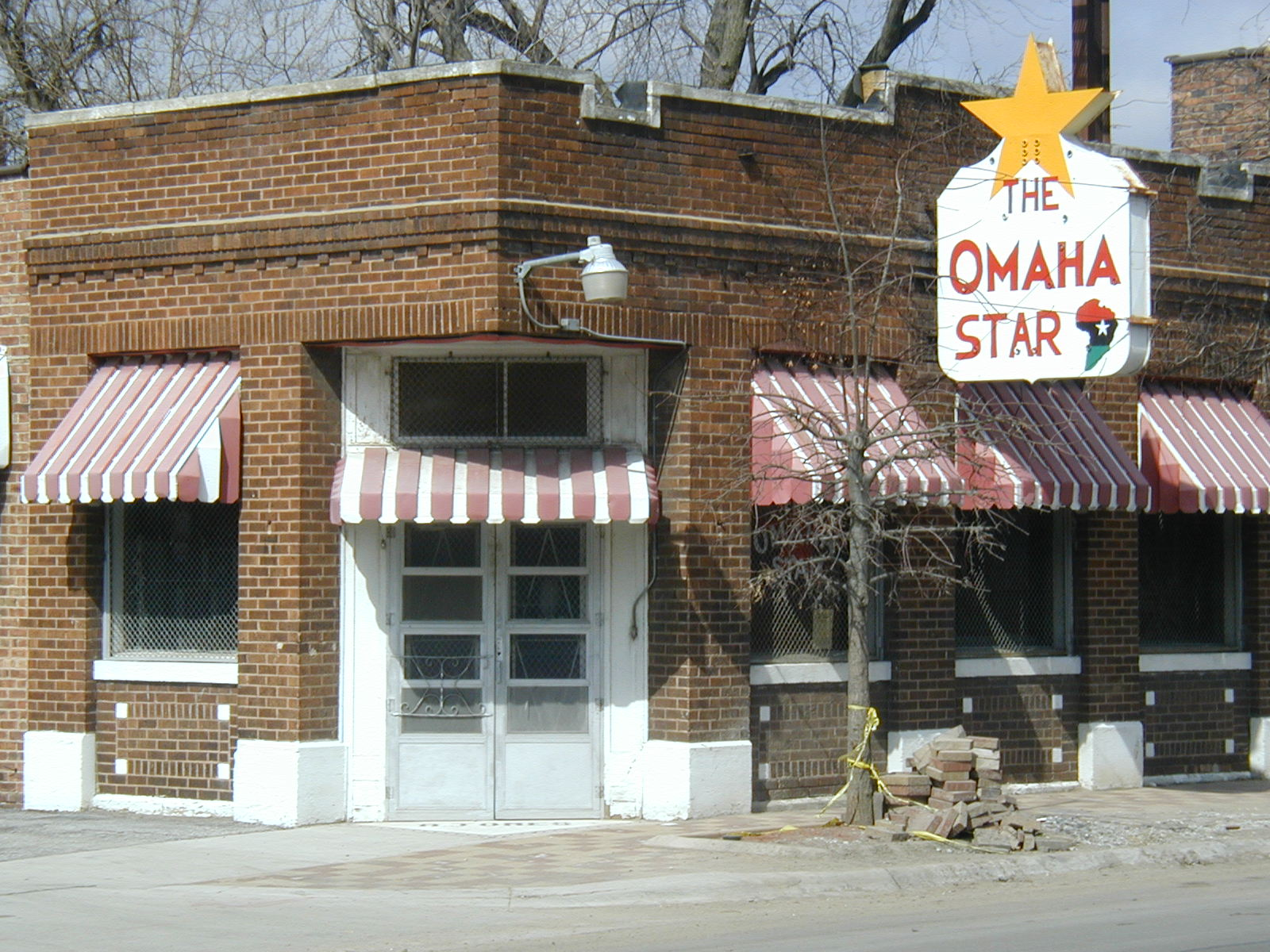
The historic office of the Omaha Star, an African American newspaper.

=== Newspapers ===
Many African American neighborhoods produce their own newspapers, including the South Fulton Neighbor in Atlanta, the Capitol Update in Tallahassee, the Chicago Defender in Chicago, the Amsterdam News in New York City, and the Star in Omaha.

=== Education ===
Segregation in schools and universities led to the creation of many Black schools. Public elementary, junior and senior high schools across the United States existed during the period of legal segregation. Students that attended school went through either vocational classes or regular high school. Vocational school offered several subjects such as cosmetology, tailoring and welding. On the college level, a handful of historically Black colleges and universities developed before the Civil War and many more established after 1865. These colleges and universities are historically often surrounded by Black neighborhoods.

=== Festivals and holidays ===
In the U.S. city of Philadelphia, the Odunde Festival (also known as "African New Year") claims to be the largest gathering of African Americans that happens annually on the second Sunday of June in the Southwest Center City section of town.

Also, the District of Columbia celebrates April 16 as Emancipation Day as a public holiday, which is an observance of the emancipation of slaves of African origin.

Although Juneteenth has increased in national and international popularity, the holiday began among Black Texans in Galveston, Texas when enslaved persons learned of the Emancipation Proclamation two years late, because slaveholders had purposefully kept this information from them. Today, several Black communities in Texas and beyond recognize June 19 as a complicated but celebratory holiday. It is also known as Jubilee Day.

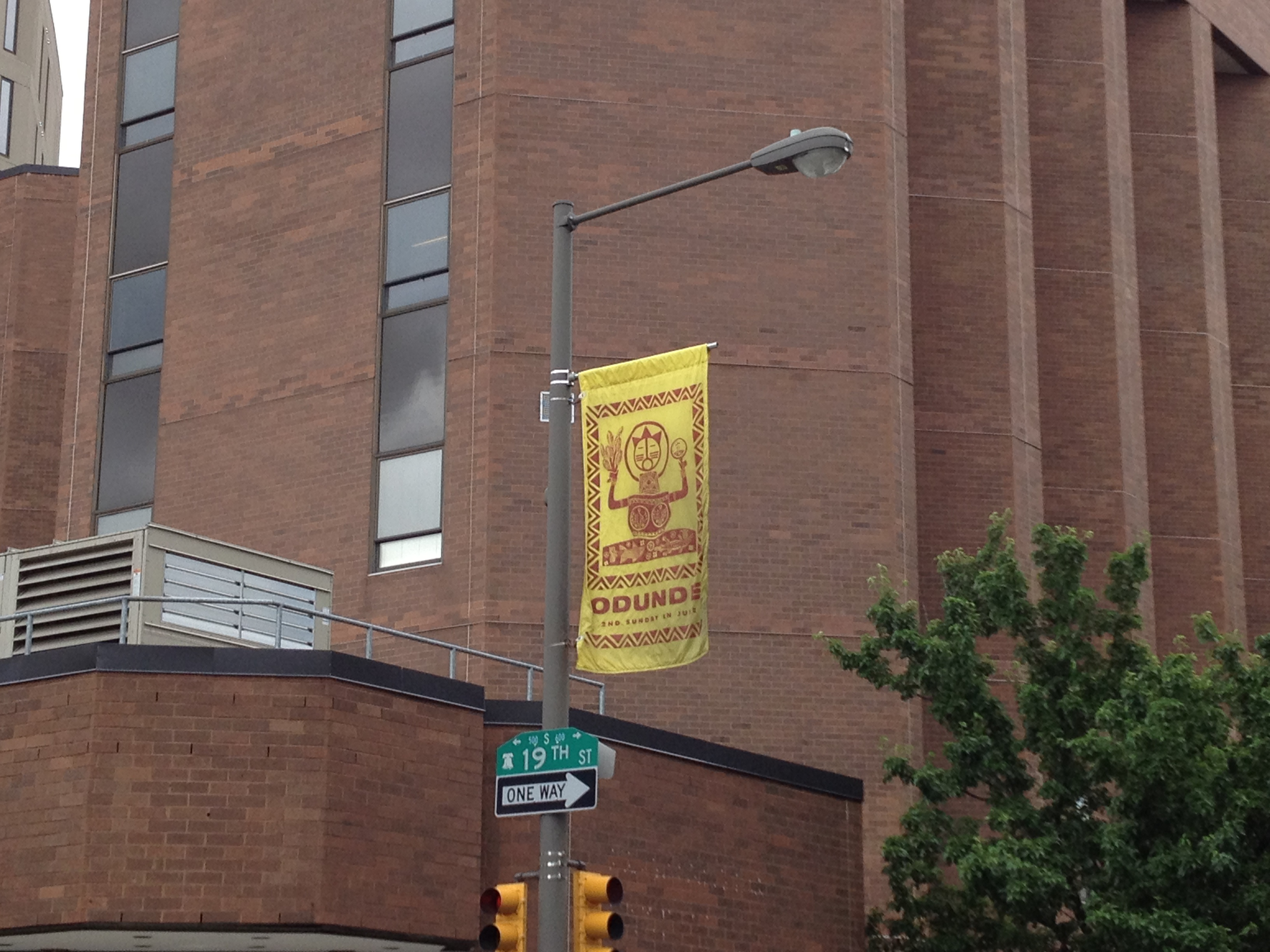
Odunde Festival is celebrated in Philadelphia's Southwest Center City the largest gathering of African Americans on the East Coast of the United States.

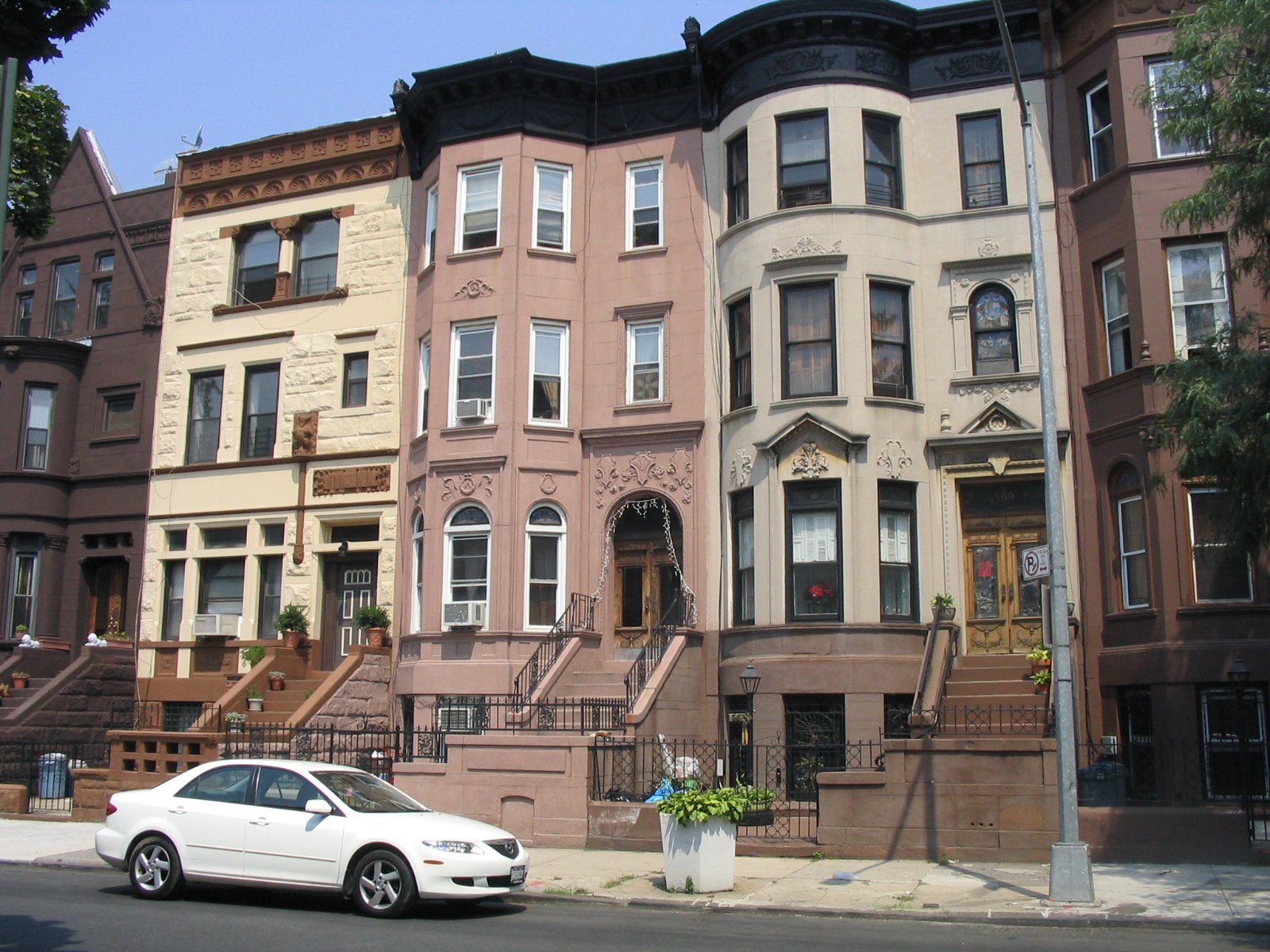
Brooklyn's Bedford-Stuyvesant (also known as BedSty) is in New York City.

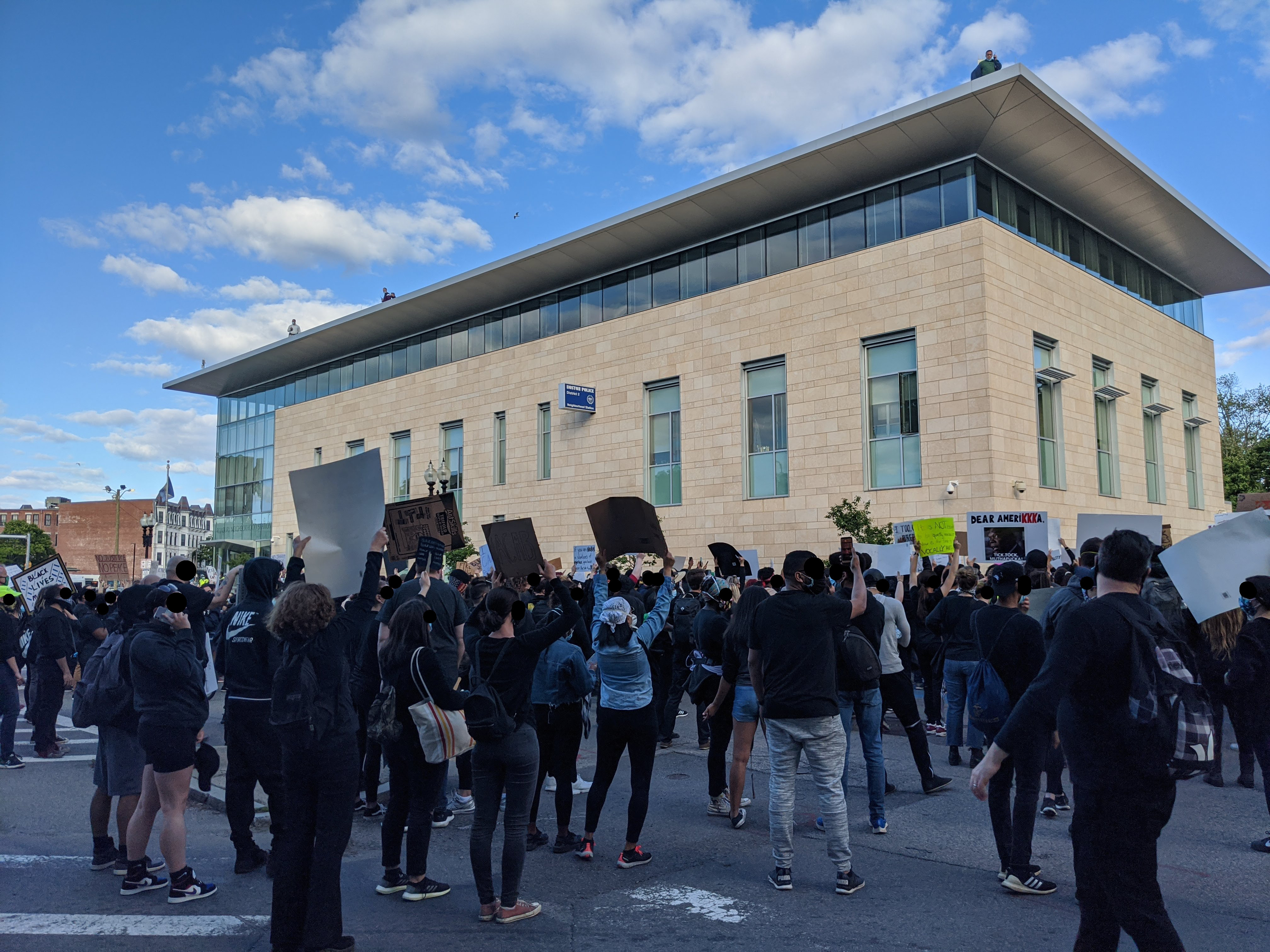
Crowds gather at the beginning of a George Floyd march in front a police station in Roxbury, Boston's historic Black neighborhood.

== Built environment ==
Many African American neighborhoods are located in inner cities or are a part of an urban center. These are the mostly residential neighborhoods located closest to the central business district. The built environment is often 19th- and early 20th-century row houses or brownstones, mixed with older single-family homes that may be converted to multifamily homes. In some areas there are larger apartment buildings.

Shotgun houses are an important part of the built environment of some southern African American neighborhoods. The houses consist of three to five rooms in a row with no hallways. This African American house design is found in both rural and urban southern areas, mainly in African-American communities and neighborhoods (especially in New Orleans).

The term "shotgun house," is often said to come from the saying that one could fire a shotgun through the front door and the pellets would fly cleanly through the house and out the back door. However, the name's origin may actually reflect an African architectural heritage, perhaps being a corruption of a term such as to-gun, which means "place of assembly" in the Southern Dohomey Fon area.

During the periods of population decline and urban decay in the 1970s and 1980s, many African American neighborhoods, like other urban minority neighborhoods, turned abandoned lots into community gardens. Community gardens serve social and economic functions, providing safe, open spaces in areas with few parks. Organizations such as Philadelphia Green, organized by the Philadelphia Horticultural Society, have helped communities organize gardens to build community feeling and improve neighborhoods. They can be places for socialization, fresh vegetables in neighborhoods poorly served by supermarkets, and sources of traditional African American produce.

== Concerns in Black neighborhoods ==
=== Environmental racism ===
African American neighborhoods, have been subject to pollution from companies that establish their operations there, affecting poor and communities with marginalized ethnicities. Infrastructures that produce major sources of persistent emissions, such as roads, rail lines and industrial facilities, are often located in redlined neighborhoods, resulting in environmental health disparities related to class and race.

== See also ==
- List of African-American neighborhoods
- List of U.S. metropolitan areas with large African-American populations
- List of U.S. communities with African-American majority populations
- Gentrification
- Colonia (United States)
- White flight
- Racial segregation in the United States
- Housing segregation in the United States
- Land of the Blacks (Manhattan)
