= African American Museum of Iowa =

History museum in Cedar Rapids, Iowa

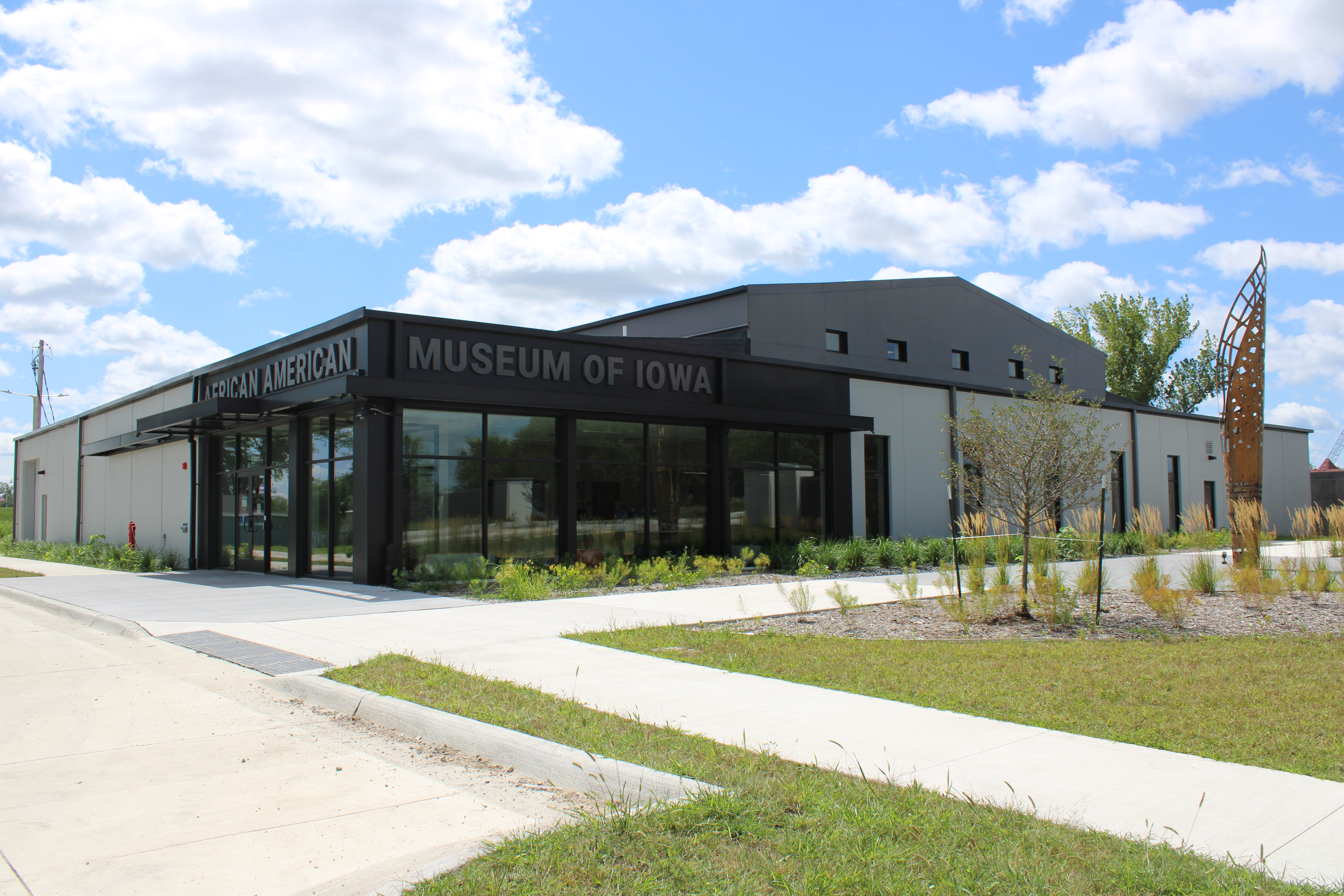
- African American Museum of Iowa
- Established: 1993
- Location: 55 12th Avenue SE, Cedar Rapids, Iowa 52401
- Coordinates: 41°58′7.56″N 91°39′34.96″W
- Type: African American heritage
- Director: Anne Harris Carter
- Curator: Felicite Wolfe
- Website: http://www.blackiowa.org/

The African American Museum of Iowa (AAMI), nestled along the Cedar River near downtown Cedar Rapids, Iowa, United States, has been carrying out its mission “To preserve, publicize, and educate the public on the African American heritage and culture of Iowa” since its incorporation as a 501(c)(3) organization in 1993. It has become the leading educational resource on African American history in Iowa and has two on-site exhibits: a permanent exhibit called Endless Possibilities, and a temporary exhibit which changes annually. Additionally, the AAMI has several "traveling exhibits" that are available for reservation by libraries, schools, businesses, etc.

Each year the AAMI serves over 30,000 people, offering tours, educational programming for all ages, special events, and much more across the state of Iowa.

== History ==
The African American Museum was started in 1993 by a small group from the Mount Zion Missionary Baptist Church in Cedar Rapids, with the goal of preserving the heritage of African Americans in Iowa in celebration of Black History Month. That year, the African American Heritage Foundation, Inc. was chartered in Iowa as a 501(c)(3) non-profit organization.

Four years later, in 1998, the foundation hired its first full-time employee, Joseph McGill, who served as the executive director. In 2000, a temporary museum opened in Westdale Mall in Cedar Rapids, and in April 2002, construction began on a new 17,000 square foot, state-of-the-art facility along the Cedar River.

In May 2003, Thomas Moore was named interim executive director for the AAMI; the interim was dropped in November. The Grand Opening of the AAMI was on September 19, 2003, and highlighted the Exhibition|permanent exhibit Doorways: A History of African Americans in Iowa.

The following year brought the creation of an endowment fund for the museum, as well as the opening of the new Africa section of the permanent exhibit. Visitors started in West Africa, where they passed through the “Door of No Return” and entered a slave ship to experience the famous Middle Passage from Africa to the United States.

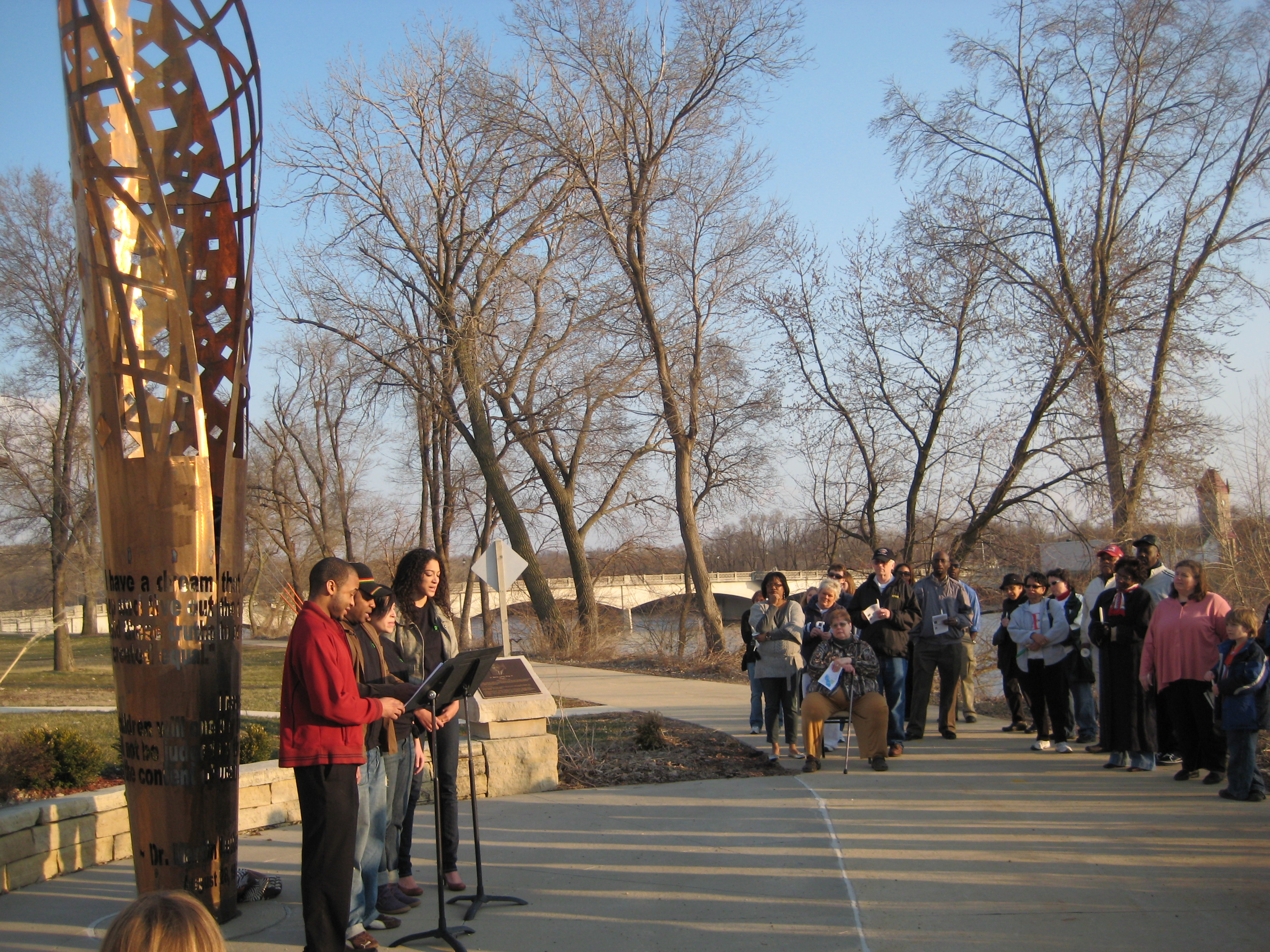
Community members perform in front of the public art piece 'Trumpet' at the 2008 Martin Luther King Jr. Memorial Celebration

In 2005, the 12th Ave. bridge near the AAMI was renamed the Dr. Martin Luther King Jr. Memorial Bridge, and a public art piece, Trumpet, was unveiled on the museum grounds near the Cedar River Trail.

Museum chapters were established in eight communities across Iowa in 2006, and in 2007 the AAMI received a grant from the Institute of Museum and Library Services (IMLS) to hire and train two staff members to coordinate the chapter program. Later that same year, the AAMI received a second grant from the IMLS to conduct a statewide oral history project entitled Adult Voices–Children’s Eyes: Iowa's African American Oral History Project. This innovative and ongoing project trained youth groups across Iowa to conduct oral histories in their communities. These sessions recorded important events and sparked a passion for history among African American youth.

The following year, the AAMI was devastated by the Iowa flood of 2008. The first floor of the museum, home to the education and collection staff as well as the gift shop, rental hall, and both exhibits, was filled with 5.5 feet of standing water. This catastrophic natural disaster caused significant damage to the building and at least half of the museum's artifacts, necessitating $1.3 million in repairs.

On January 17, 2009, the AAMI was reopened to the public, featuring building renovations and repairs as well as a new temporary exhibit: No Roads Lead to Buxton. A new permanent exhibit, Endless Possibilities, was opened on December 15, 2009, and uses photos, objects, stories, and multimedia to trace the journeys of Iowa's African Americans.

In spring 2023, the AAMI held a groundbreaking ceremony for its on-going renovation project. The $5M project began in response to the City of Cedar Rapids' updates to the flood control system. Given the AAMI's close proximity to the Cedar River, the new flood wall and gate directly impacted the building's entrance. The AAMI saw this impact as an opportunity to make other, necessary changes to both the interior and the exterior of the museum while growing our endowment. In addition to the $5M being raised for the renovation project, the AAMI seeks to grow its endowment by $1M.

The Museum reopened to the public in May 2024 following the renovation project. The public art piece, Trumpet, was relocated near the Museum's new lobby.

== Collection and exhibits ==
The AAMI's collection includes more than 2,000 artifacts, 70 linear feet of archives, and 200 oral histories. Additionally, the AAMI's Library holds more than 1,000 volumes on African and African American topics.

=== Exhibit galleries ===
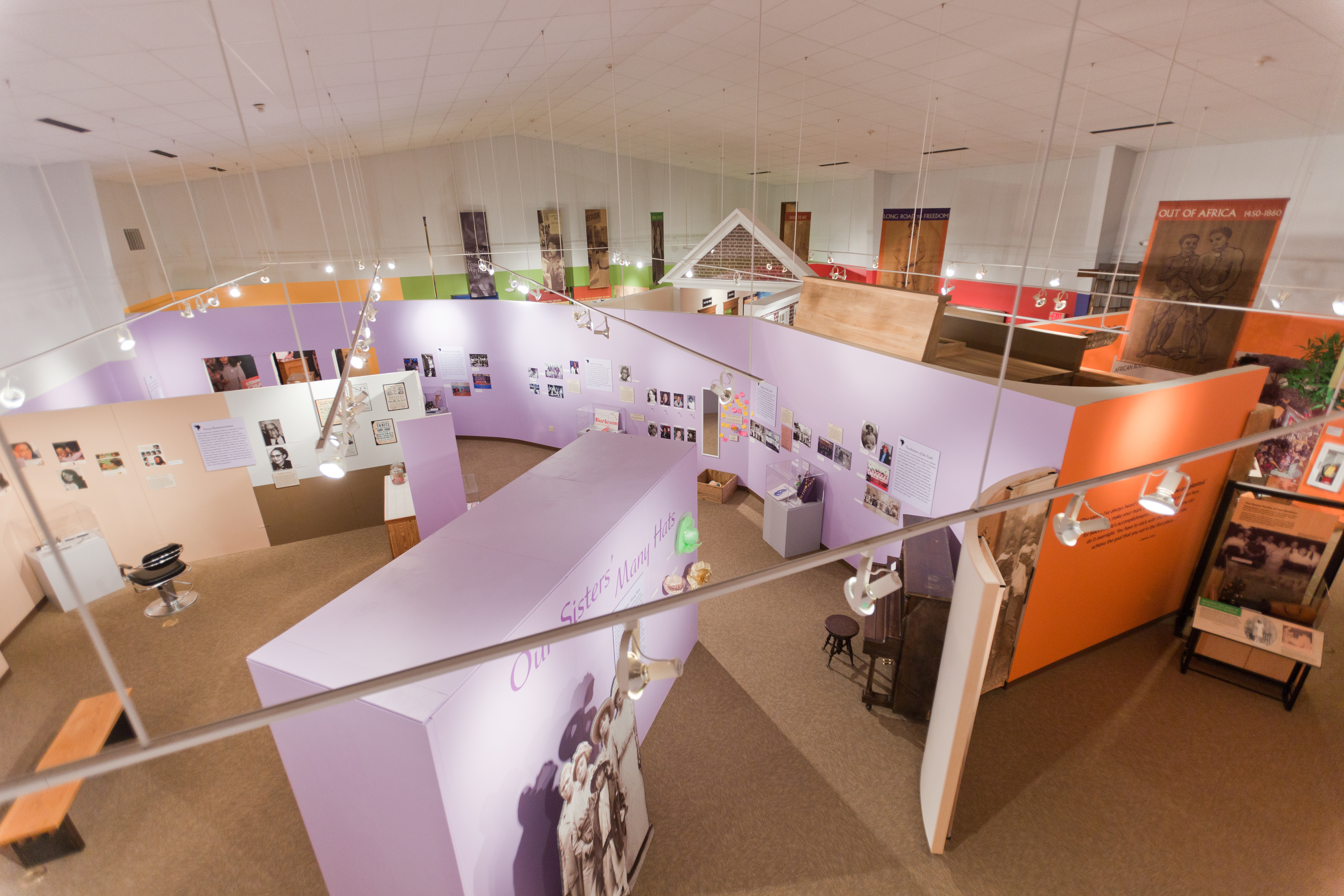
Inside the AAMI: Left: Gayle Sayers Changing Exhibit Gallery. Right: Permanent exhibit Endless Possibilities.

The AAMI has two exhibit galleries on site. The first of these contains Endless Possibilities, which was installed in 2009. This permanent exhibit traces Iowa's African American heritage from its origins in Western Africa through Slavery, the American Civil War, the Underground Railroad, the Civil Rights Movement, and struggles and accomplishments today.

The second exhibit is housed in the Gale Sayers Changing Exhibit Gallery, which displays at least one new temporary exhibit each year.

Exhibits have included but are not limited to:

- Racist Things: Hateful Imagery in the American Home (2024-2025)
- 30 Years of the AAMI (2024)
- Power and Impact (2023-2024, in partnership with the Cedar Rapids Museum of Art)*
- Suspended: Systemic Oppression in Our Schools (2022-2023)*
- Mapping Exclusion: Redlining in Iowa (2021-2022)
- Unwavering: 21st Century Activism (2020-2021)
- Untangling the Roots (2019-2020)
- Driven By Hope (2018-2019)
- If Objects Could Talk (2017-2018)
- Mightier Than the Sword (2016-2017)
- Products of a Creative Mind (2015–2016)
- Behind the Beat (2014–2015)
- Western Africa: Before the Boats (2013–2014)
- The Only One (2012)

=== Traveling exhibits ===
In addition to its on-site exhibits, the AAMI offers several traveling exhibits. These exhibits include:

- Behind the Beat
- Driven By Hope
- Iowa Civil Rights
- Iowa Roots, Global Impact: The Life and Legacy of George Washington Carver
- Mapping Exclusion: Redlining in Iowa
- No Roads Lead to Buxton
- The Only One
- Products of a Creative Mind
- Riding the Freedom Train: The Underground Railroad in Iowa
- Suspended: Systemic Oppression in Our Schools
- Unconditional Loyalty: The Military Service of African Americans
- Untangling the Roots
- Western Africa: Before the Boats

== Programming ==
Following the Iowa Flood of 2008, the AAMI recognized the need to shift its primary focus from preserving African American history to playing a more active role in educating people about this history within the Cedar Rapids area and across Iowa.

With this revised focus in mind, the AAMI has developed numerous programs and partnerships that offer educational opportunities. These events include annual Juneteenth programming, a variety of workshops for learners of all ages, lectures and programs for people in the area and across Iowa. The AAMI also hosts an annual History Makers Gala. This event recognizes Black Iowans who are making history in their communities while also raising funds to support the AAMI's mission.

== See also ==
- List of museums focused on African Americans
