= Zion Union Heritage Museum =

Museum in Hyannis, Massachusetts

Coordinates: 41°39′4.05″N 70°17′34.10″W

The Zion Union Heritage Museum is a museum dedicated to African American and Cape Verdean American history that is located in Hyannis, Massachusetts. It was formerly a church for black congregants in Hyannis. It opened as a museum in 2007.
