= St. Rita's Colored Catholic Mission =

- U.S. National Register of Historic Places
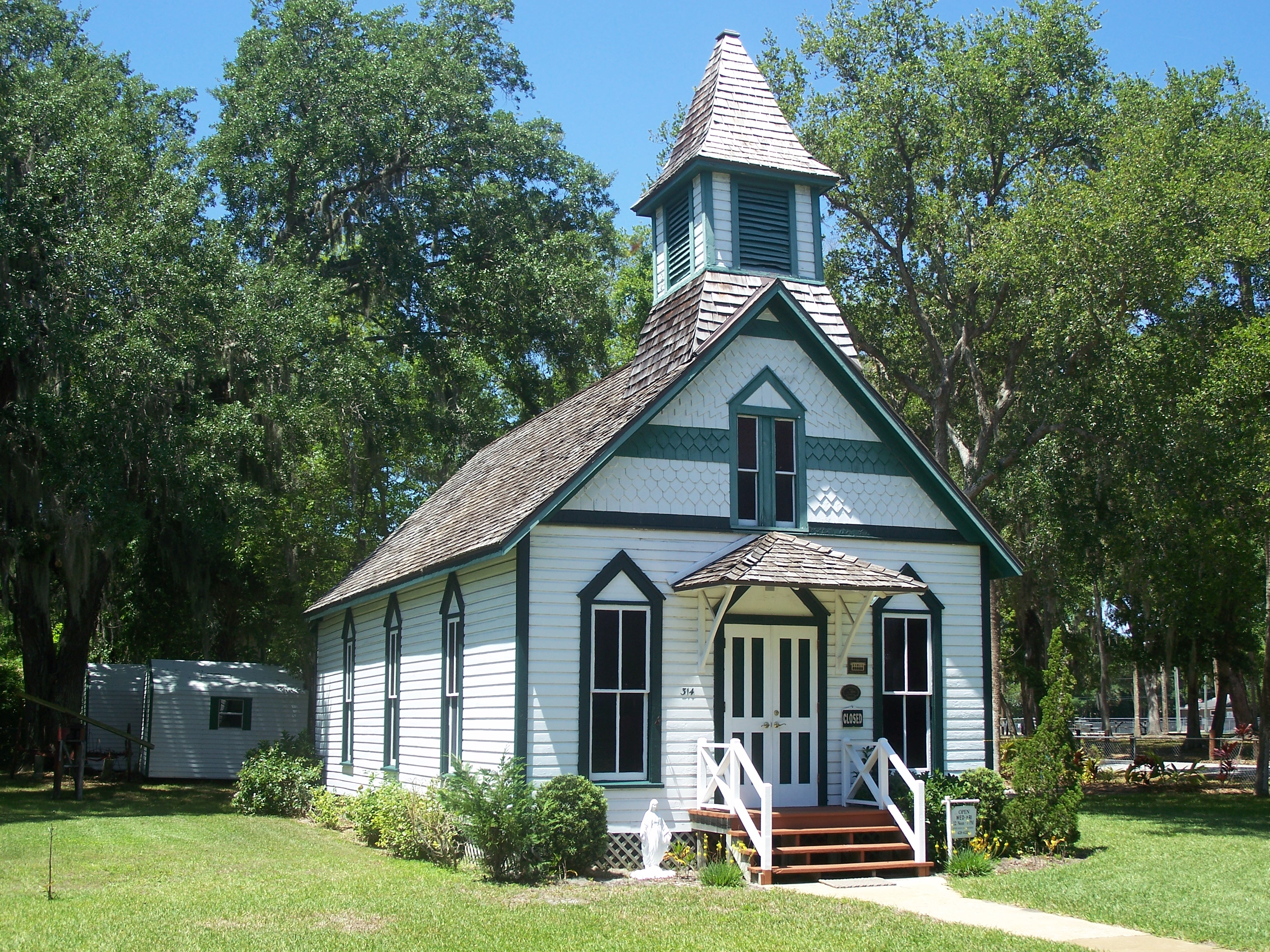

- Location within Volusia County
- Location: 314 Duss St., New Smyrna Beach, Florida
- Coordinates: 29°01′29″N 80°55′59″W
- Area: less than one acre
- Built: 1899
- Architectural style: Late Gothic Revival
- NRHP reference No.: 07000280
- Added to NRHP: April 13, 2007

The St. Rita's Colored Catholic Mission is a historic building in New Smyrna Beach, Florida, United States. Built in 1899 as Sacred Heart Catholic Church on Faulkner Street, it was relocated to 314 Duss Street in 1956 to serve as a Catholic Mission to the African-American community. Today, it is the Mary S. Harrell Black Heritage Museum. On April 13, 2007, the building was added to the U.S. National Register of Historic Places.
