= African American Museum of Nassau County =

Coordinates: 40.709542°N 73.627662°W

The "Joysetta and Julius Pearse African American Museum of Nassau County" was renamed on 18 May 2021 for its long-time Directors. African American Museum also known as the African American Museum of Nassau County, which opened in 1970, is dedicated to showcasing local and national African American artists. The 6,000 sq. ft. facility is operated by the Museum Services Division of the Nassau County Department of Recreation, Parks and Support Services, the museum is located at 110 North Franklin Street in Hempstead, New York and is one of a number of cultural organizations in the region where visitors can learn about the role of African Americans in Long Island's history. The museum, one of the only African American museums in New York City, hosts a number of events including Black History Month and Kwanzaa celebrations and commemorations of the lives of important figures including Martin Luther King Jr. and Malcolm X among others. In an effort to increase visitation, Nassau County decided in 2005 to eliminate admission fees.

One of the museum's founders was Dr. Leroy Ramsey, a former military historian for the Department of Defense. and the museum's Director for the first twenty years was Willie Houston. In addition to the large number of school groups that the museum receives, the museum is also the location of and is managed by the African Atlantic Genealogy Society, which provides workshops and research assistance into family genealogy.

In 2005 the museum was one of the first ten recipients of the Museum Preservation Award, granted by American Legacy magazine.

The museum also acts as a community center that promotes African American culture through education, art, and other programs that would help enlighten the public. The museum holds Long Island prominent in most exhibits as a representation of the region. Further more, the museum also curates genealogical consultations through a program called " Digging for Roots at the African American Museum."

== See also ==
- List of museums focused on African Americans
