= Beck Cultural Exchange Center =

- Established: 1975
- Location: 1927 Dandridge Avenue; Knoxville, Tennessee 37915
- Coordinates: 35°58′23″N 83°53′53″W
- Type: African American museum
- Website: beckcenter.net

The Beck Cultural Exchange Center is a museum in Knoxville, Tennessee. The museum was established in 1975 to preserve the city's history, but its mission subsequently broadened to tell the story of the history and culture of African-Americans in East Tennessee.

The Center's collection includes more than fifty thousand artifacts, and a 2022 expansion into the Delaney Museum, which will honor Beauford Delaney and Joseph Delaney in the artists last home, will allow the center to better showcase those artifacts.
