= The African American Museum in Cleveland =

Coordinates: 41.508747°N 81.627263°W

African American Museum
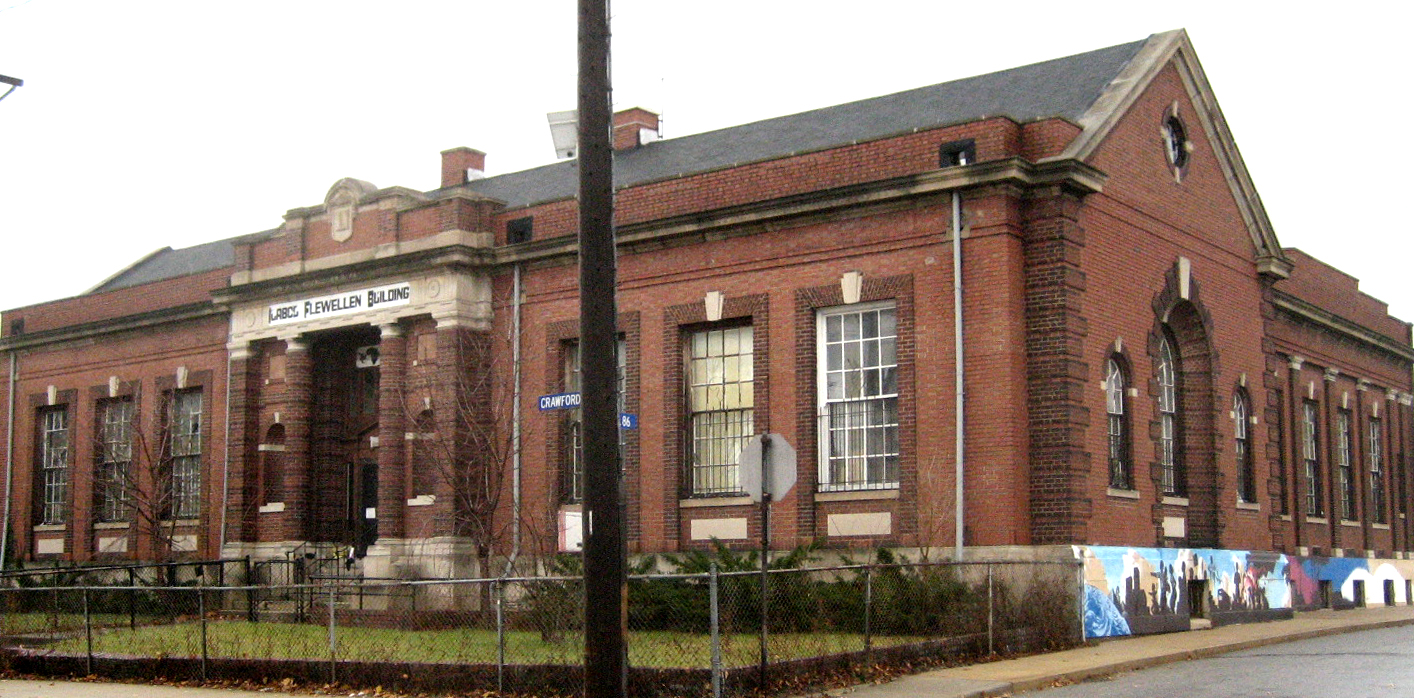
- The African American Museum in Cleveland
- Established: April 1953
- Location: Cleveland, Ohio, United States
- Type: African-American museum
- Collections: African-American history and culture
- Website: Official website

African American Museum (formerly the Afro-American Cultural & Historical Society Museum) in Cleveland, Ohio was founded in 1953 by Icabod Flewellen. The Museum is housed in a 100-year-old Carnegie Library building. The Museum works to educate young people about the positive contributions of blacks to the cultures of the world, and to eliminate the distorted portrayals and images of black people.

== History ==
The African American Museum in Cleveland was founded by Icabod Flewellen in 1953. It became the first independent African American museum to open in America. Flewellen was a long-time resident of East Cleveland and best known for his extensive collection of African-American historical artifacts and souvenirs. By age 13, Flewellen began collecting historical newspaper clippings dedicated to the history of black Americans, a passion inspired by the writings of Jamaican-born author J. A. Rogers. Icabod’s first museum collection, which he noted had been exceedingly rich with historical material, was destroyed at his West Virginia home in a firebomb by white supremacists shortly after his return from the military. Flewellen’s collection of materials, after the fire in his West Virginia home, eventually became the main artifacts of the Museum. He then migrated to Cleveland, Ohio in 1949, began collecting materials again, and relaunched his second African American Museum originally known as the Afro-American Historical and Cultural Society in 1953. The majority of Flewellen’s collected material was obtained by visiting neighbors and asking them about their family histories. One collection that remains in the museum today is from the Cleveland’s "Parade of Progress" in 1964. Other portions of his collection went to the East Cleveland Library Debra Ann November Center.

== Mission ==
The African American Museum, formerly the Afro-American Cultural & Historical Society Museum which was established in April 1953 is located at 1765 Crawford Rd. in Cleveland. It is a nonprofit cultural and educational museum that aims to share the achievements of African Americans. Flewellen believed that everyone should have the opportunity to see the accomplishments of Africans and those of African descent. Although they were originally stored at his home on Harkness Avenue, it was moved in 1968 to a classroom at St. Marian’s School. In May 1973, the collection (more than 200,000 items at the time) was moved to 1839 E. 81st St., where it was housed until February 1983, when the Cleveland Public Library (CPL) leased Flewellen its Treasure House building on Crawford Rd. CPL turned over the management of the building to the museum in September 1984. The museum building was renamed Icabod Flewellen in 1987 and can be seen in the photo.

== Funding ==
Flewellen worked other jobs to support this project and due to an increase in black history interest, he received grants for special projects, such as a $10,000 grant from the Cleveland Foundation in 1970 to catalog his collection. The Ohio Humanities Council and the National Endowment for the Humanities also provided support, and in 1983 the museum received a $50,000 community development block grant for lectures to schoolchildren and community groups. In 1992 the museum received grants from the Cleveland and Gund Foundations.

== Closure ==
The museum has been closed since 2005 due to lack of proper building functions and funds. As of 2010, it is open only on selected days. It is raising funds in hopes of re-opening. Its mission will remain the same: to store, share, and educate the public on contributions made to the world by people of African descent.

Over the decades, the museum has provided the Cleveland community with cultural education about black history and events that celebrate African Americans.

== Exhibits ==
- African Past and Present
- Civil Movements in America
- Reflections of Black Life in Cleveland
- Black Scientists and Inventors (Supported in part by NASA.)
- The African Solar Village Outreach Project

In partnership with Green Energy Ohio the museum hosted an exhibit on the use of solar power in African Villages. The museum installed a solar panel on its roof. The components of the system are in a clear display case and part of the exhibit. The African Solar Village Outreach Project plans to establish creative avenues for teaching science and mathematics, specifically Solar Energy, to visitors. The African Solar Village exhibit, its other tours and hands-on activities are designed to offer an understanding of how science and culture interrelate in unique ways.

== See also ==
- List of museums focused on African Americans
