= Funeral cosmetology =

Procedures for preparing a corpse for viewing

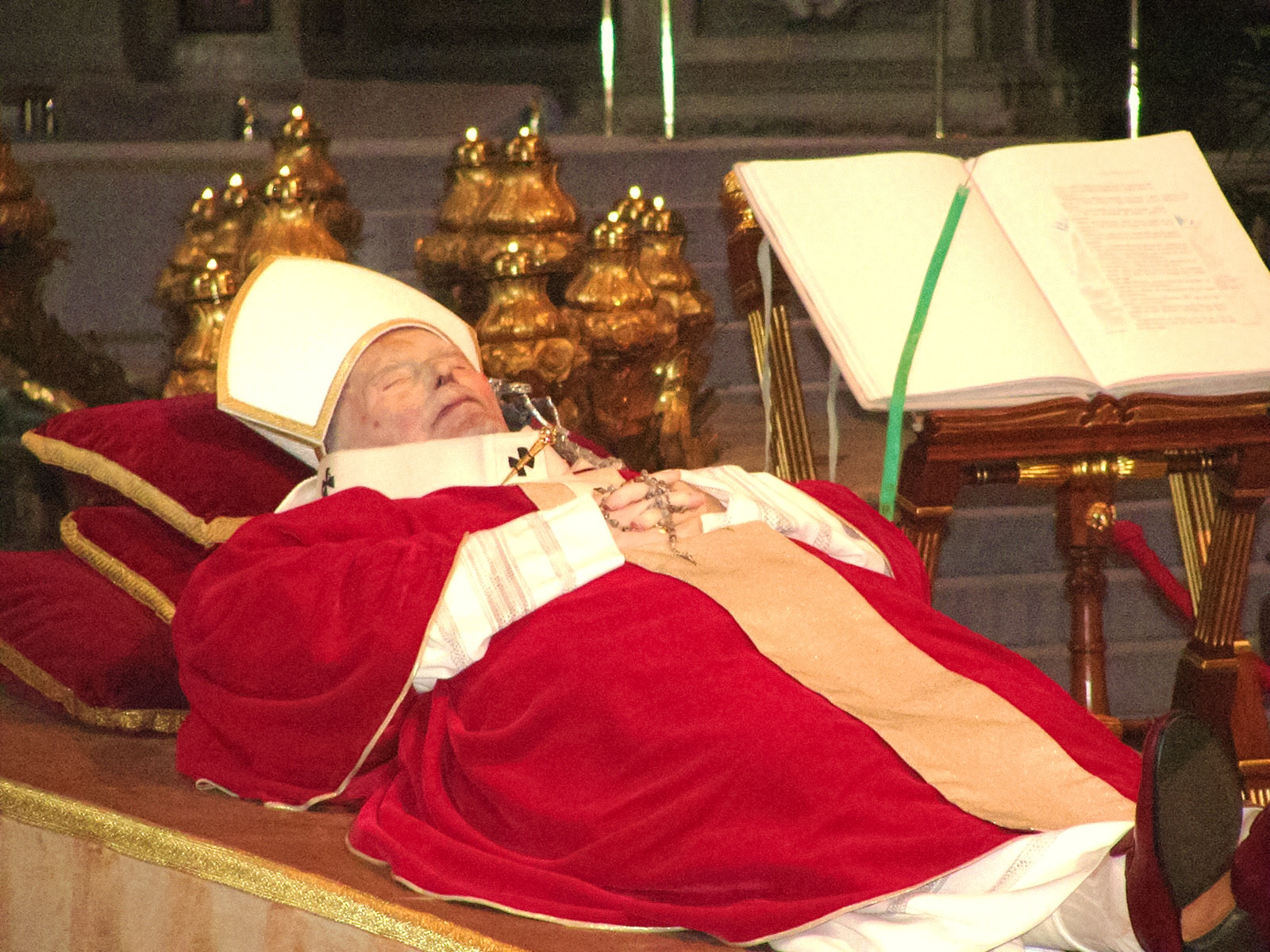
An example of a deceased person (Pope John Paul II) prepared for viewing

Funeral cosmetology, also known as mortuary makeup, restorative arts, mortuary cosmetology, or desairology, is a cosmetological art practiced on deceased human bodies to prepare for viewing. The goal of a funeral cosmetologist is to make a person appear as they did when alive and to give them the appearance of resting.

Funeral cosmetology is a relatively new field, only becoming specialized in the 1970s and 1980s, as preparation a cadaver for viewing has traditionally been the job of an embalmer or funeral director. Often, basic flesh-tone makeup is all that is needed in preparing a cadaver, and cadavers with simple hairstyles may not need the specialized services of a cosmetologist. Funeral cosmetologists often reconstruct the appearance of a cadaver based on a photograph of the person while they were alive. Conditions of death such as illness or physical trauma may affect the job of a funeral cosmetologist. Additionally, embalming chemicals may make the hair of a cadaver dry and brittle.

According to the National Accrediting Commission of Cosmetology Arts and Sciences (NACCAS), no colleges or universities in the United States currently offer specific programs of study for mortuary cosmetologists, although morturary education may be part of a standard cosmetology course. U.S. states do not require special licensing for mortuary cosmetologists beyond the standard cosmetology license, which is a requirement for cosmetologists in all 50 U.S. states.

== See also ==
- Embalming
