= Capitol School of Hairstyling & Esthetics =

Cosmetology school in Omaha, Nebraska, US

Capitol School of Hairstyling & Esthetics (Capitol School of Hair Design) is a cosmetology and esthetics school in Omaha, Nebraska, United States. It was founded in 1923. The school is approved by the Nebraska State Board of Education, accredited by the National Accrediting Commission of Cosmetology Arts and Sciences (NACCAS), and licensed by the Nebraska State Board of Cosmetology.

Eric Hahn won the title "World's Tallest Mohawk" from the Guinness Book of World Records on November 14, 2008, at Capitol School.

Lyal McCaig, the owner and Director of Education for Capitol, was named "Legend of Hair" by Omaha Magazine shortly before he died in 2007.
