= Funeral director =

Professional in the business of funeral procedures

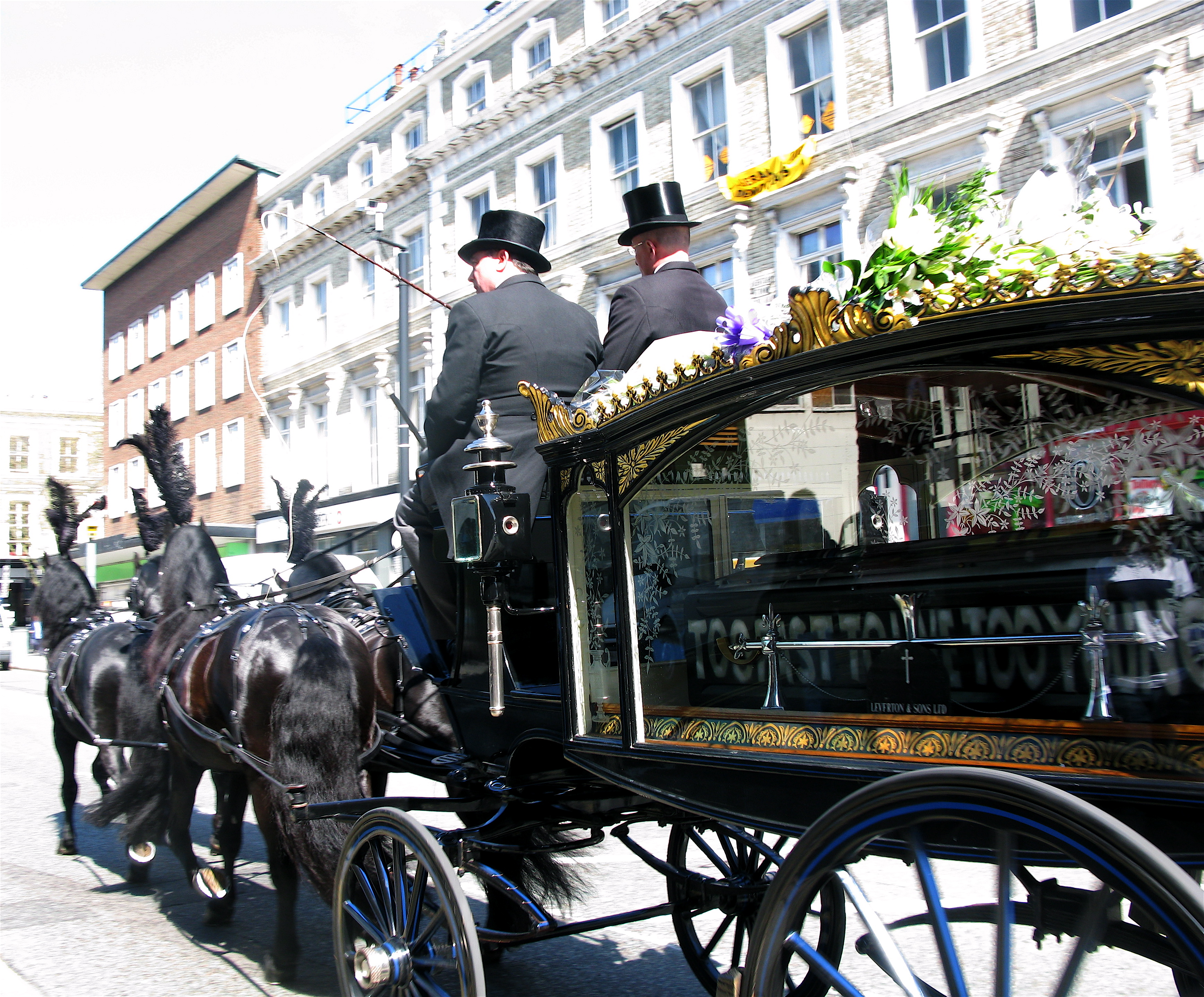
Funeral directors driving a hearse in a funeral procession

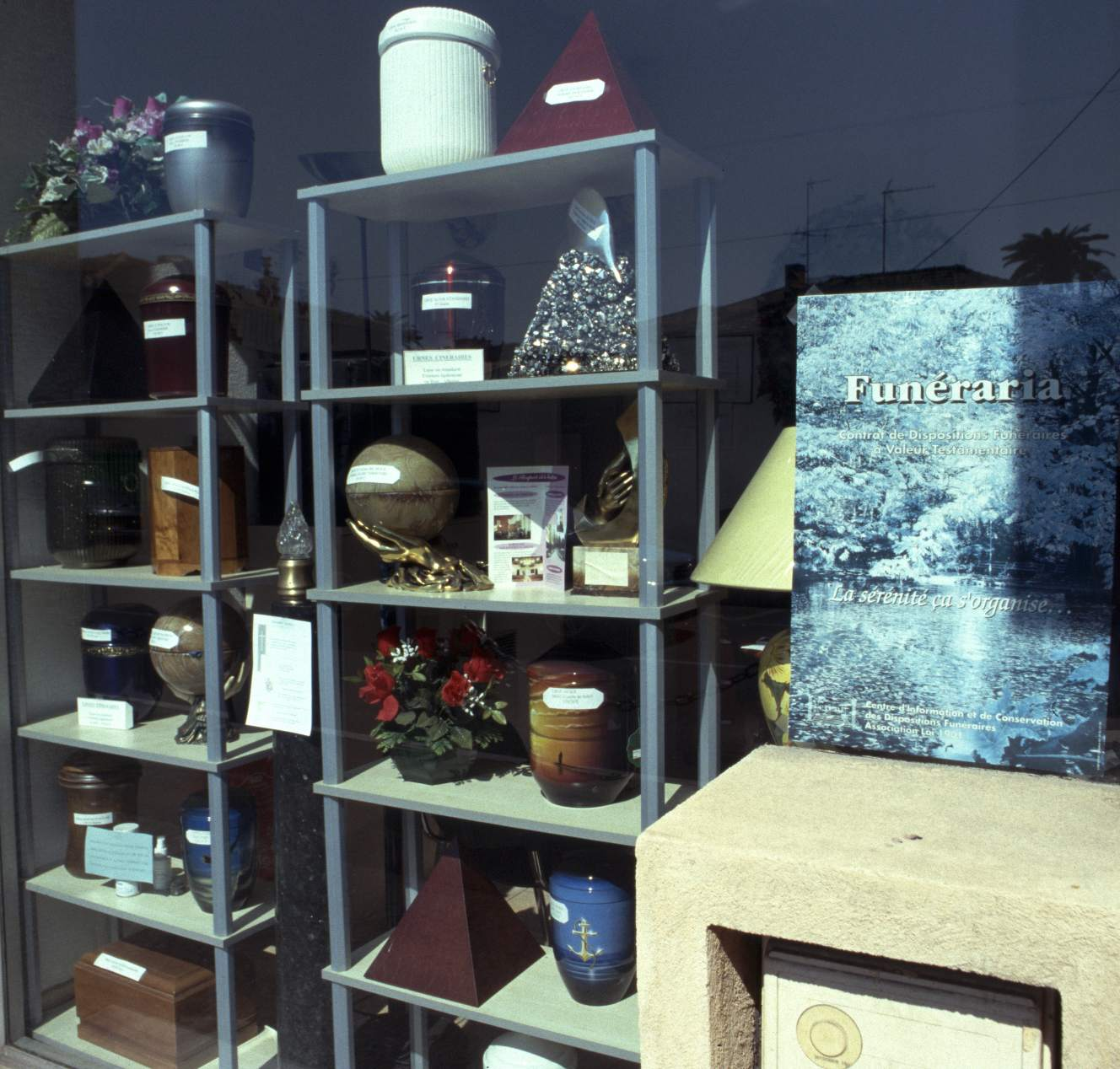
Showcase of an urn shop in Nice, France

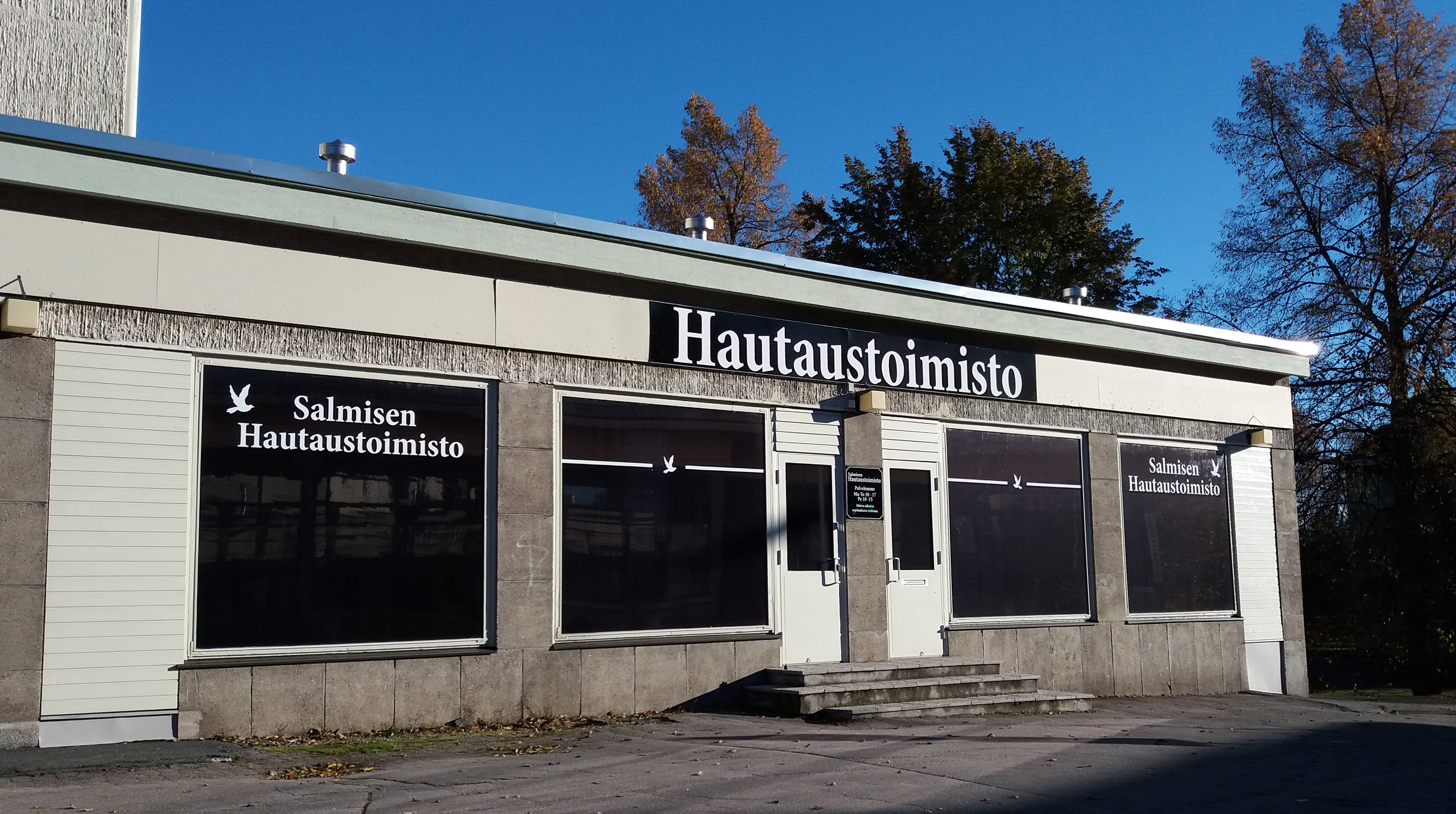
A funeral home in Jyväskylä, Finland

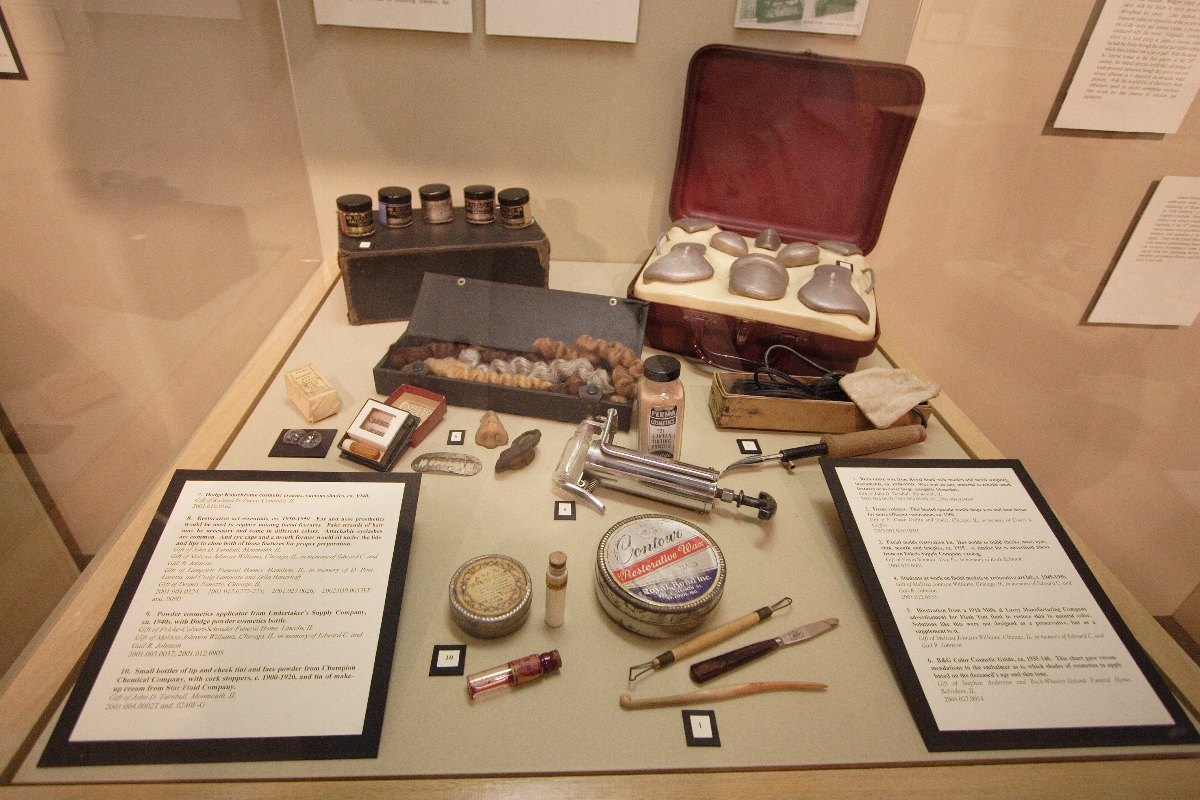
Mortician's restorative tools, Museum of Funeral Customs, Springfield, Illinois

A funeral director, also known as an undertaker or mortician (American English), is a professional who has licenses in funeral arranging and embalming (or preparation of the deceased) involved in the business of funeral rites. These tasks often entail the embalming and burial or cremation of the dead, as well as the arrangements for the funeral ceremony (although not the directing and conducting of the funeral itself unless clergy are not present). Funeral directors may at times be asked to perform tasks such as dressing (in garments usually suitable for daily wear), casketing (placing the corpse in the coffin), and cossetting (applying any sort of cosmetic or substance to the best viewable areas of the corpse for the purpose of enhancing its appearance) with the proper licenses. A funeral director may work at a funeral home or be an independent employee.

== Etymology ==
The term mortician is derived from the Latin word mors- mortis ('death') with the ending -ician. In 1895, the trade magazine The Embalmers' Monthly put out a call for a new name for the profession in the US to distance itself from the title undertaker, a term that was then perceived to have been tarnished by its association with death. The term mortician was the winning entry.

== History ==
The desire to respect the dead and their survivors is as ancient as civilization itself, and death care is among the world's oldest professions. Ancient Egypt is a probable pioneer in supporting full-time morticians; intentional mummification began around 2600 BCE, with the best-preserved mummies dating to around 1570 to 1075 BCE. Specialized priests spent 70 full days on a single corpse. Only royalty, nobility and wealthy commoners could afford the service, considered by some to be essential for accessing eternal life; the poorer performed very basic intentional mummification or simply buried the body in a dry spot hoping it would naturally mummify. In every case, an intact body was considered paramount to accessing the afterlife.

Across successive cultures, religion remained a prime motive for securing a body against decay and/or arranging burial in a planned manner; some considered the fate of departed souls to be fixed and unchangeable (e.g. ancient Mesopotamia) and considered care for a grave to be more important than the actual burial.

In ancient Rome, wealthy individuals trusted family to care for their corpse, but funeral rites would feature professional mourners: most often actresses who would announce the presence of the funeral procession by wailing loudly. Other paid actors would don the masks of ancestors and recreate their personalities, dramatizing the exploits of their departed descendant. These purely ceremonial undertakers of the day nonetheless had great religious and societal impact; a larger number of actors indicated greater power and wealth for the deceased and their family.

Modern ideas about proper preservation of the dead for the benefit of the living arose in the European Age of Enlightenment. Dutch scientist Frederik Ruysch's work attracted the attention of royalty and legitimized the study of anatomy using cadavers. Most importantly, Ruysch developed injected substances and waxes that could penetrate the smallest vessels of the body and seal them against decay.

Historically, from ancient Egypt to Greece and Rome to the early United States, women typically did all of the preparation of dead bodies. They were called "layers out of the dead". In the mid-19th century, gender roles within funeral service in the United States began to change. In the late 19th century, the industry became male dominated with the development of funeral directors, which changed the funeral industry both locally and nationally.

As embalming became more complicated, funeral services moved away from individuals' homes and toward funeral parlors and then funeral homes. The rise of funeral directing as a specialized profession is generally attributed to this move and complexity of embalming science.

In the 1930s, preneed agreements came about, with funeral directors often encouraging consumers to pre-pay for future funeral services.

== Role in the United States ==
In 2003, 15 percent of corporately owned funeral homes in the US were owned by one of three corporations. The majority of morticians work in small, independent family-run funeral homes. The owner usually hires two or three other morticians to help them. Often, this hired help is in the family, perpetuating the family's ownership. Other firms that were family-owned have been acquired and are operated by large corporations such as Service Corporation International, though such homes usually trade under their pre-acquisition names.

The funeral industry remains one of the most segregated industries in America, particularly in the South. Due to discrimination, black funerals were traditionally done by Black-owned businesses employing Black funeral directors, which has persisted.

Most funeral homes have one or more viewing rooms, a preparation room for embalming, a chapel, and a casket selection room. They usually have a hearse for transportation of bodies, a flower car, and limousines. They also normally sell caskets and urns.

=== Organizations and licensing in the United States ===
Licensing requirements in the US are determined at the state level. Most require a combination of post-secondary education (typically an associate's degree), passage of a National Board Examination, passage of a state board examination, and one to two years' work as an apprentice.

==== Other regulation ====
The funeral industry is regulated by the Funeral Rule, put in place in 1984 by the FTC, which enumerates price disclosure rules and the right of consumers to use alternative products, such as an urn purchased from a third-party.

== Role in the UK ==
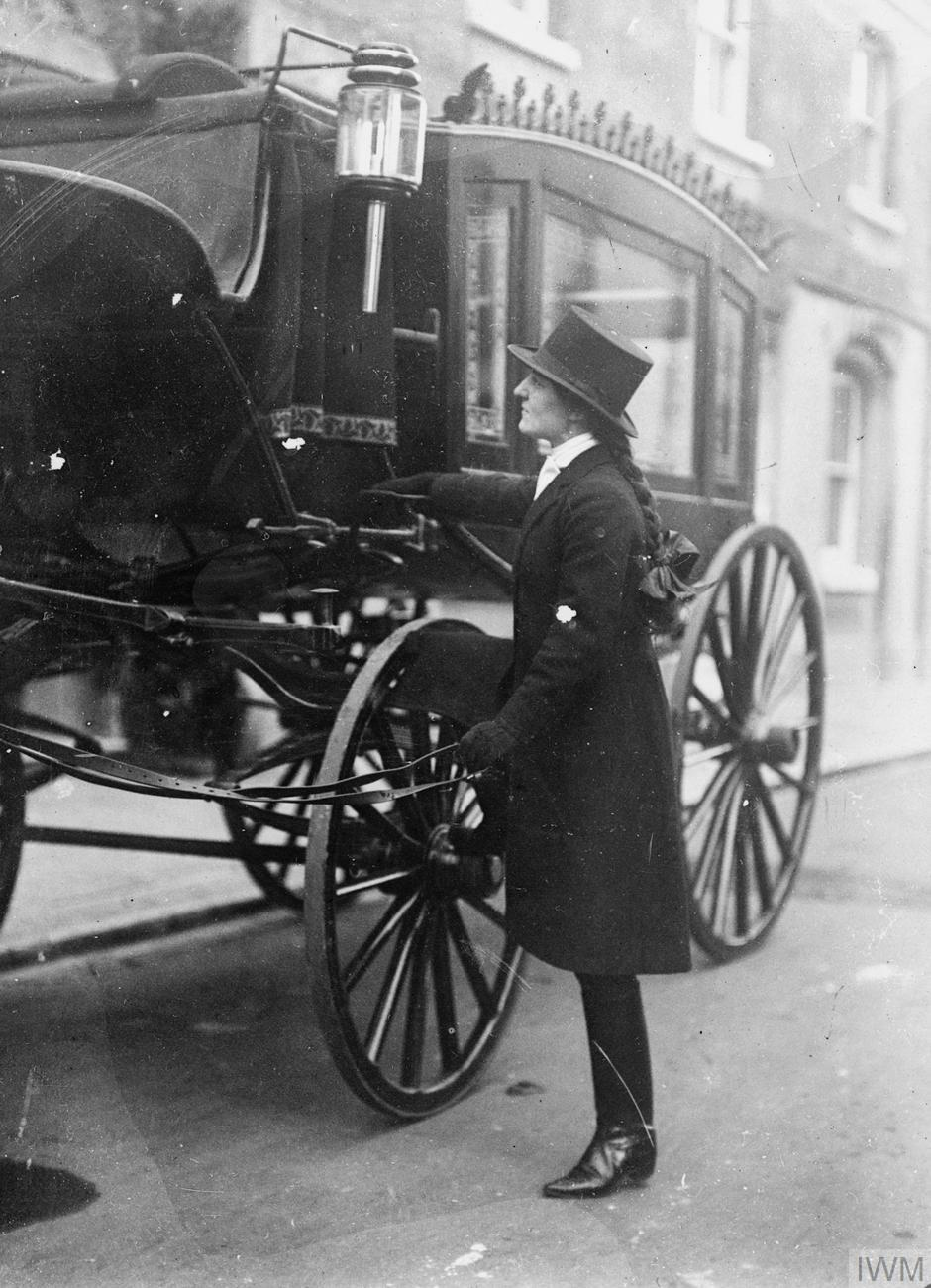
A funeral director with a horse-drawn carriage, 1918

A funeral director in the UK will usually take on most of the administrative duties and arrangement of the funeral service, including flower arrangements, meeting with family members, and overseeing the funeral and burial service. Embalming or cremation of the body requires further training. Funeral directors also often take the roll of collecting the deceased from the house or hospital, and bringing them into their care to dress and encoffin for the funeral.

A funeral director may also work on behalf of the coroner in the cases of an unexpected or suspicious deaths, these deaths involve the police to be called.

=== Organizations and licensing in the UK ===
In England and Wales no formal licence is required to become an undertaker (funeral director). There are national trade organizations such as the British Institute of Funeral Directors (BIFD), the National Association of Funeral Directors (NAFD) and the Society of Allied and Independent Funeral Directors (SAIF).

The BIFD offers a licence to funeral directors who have obtained a diploma-level qualification; these diplomas are offered by both the BIFD and NAFD.

All of the national organizations offer voluntary membership of "best practice" standards schemes, which includes regular premises inspection and adherence to a specific code of conduct.

These organizations help funeral directors demonstrate that they are committed to continuing professional development, and they have no issue with regulation should it become a legal requirement.

Since March 2025, Funeral Directors in Scotland are now regulated by the Scottish Government and require a licence to operate. They are also required to follow a code of practice outlined and regulated by the Scottish Government.

A Funeral director will require a coroner's contract in order to work on behalf of the coroner, in case of sudden, unexpected or suspicious deaths. These are issued by the coroner of the corresponding area they work within. A funeral director operating on behalf of the coroner is not operating on their respective business and as such the coroner will usually pay for the transport of the deceased from the place of death to the public hospital for post-mortem.

== Role in Canada ==
The role of a funeral director in Canada can include embalming, sales, oversight of funeral services as well as other aspects of needed funeral services.

=== Organizations and licensing in Canada ===
A funeral director in Canada will assume many responsibilities after proper education and licensing. Courses will include science and biology, ethics, and practical techniques of embalming. There are a number of organizations available to Canadian funeral directors.

== See also ==
- Deathcare
