= Setting the features =

Part of funeral procedures

Setting the features is a mortuary term for the closing of the eyes and the mouth of a deceased person such that the cadaver is presentable as being in a state of rest and repose, and thus more suitable for viewing. While it is one of the first stages of embalming, it is also commonly done as a token of respect even when the deceased is not viewed or is directly cremated. Generally only when the deceased (or their family) have specifically requested the body be untouched are the features left unset.

== Preparation ==
The body is disinfected and insects such as maggots and flies are removed. The body is then washed with water and germicidal soap. This movement of the body parts also helps to relieve rigor mortis, and particular attention is given by the embalmer to parts of the body that are most visible during a viewing: the facial area and hands. The hair is washed and styled, either before or after the embalming.

The body is shaved in accordance to the family's wishes. The embalmer also relieves rigor mortis of the corpse by flexing and massaging various parts of the body. Prior to embalming, the embalmer will also position the corpse to an approximate final position. After embalming the muscles will firm and it may become difficult to position the corpse. In extreme cases where positioning is difficult, such as bodies with arthritis or paralysis, the embalmer may cut tendons and utilise straps to hold the body in a suitable position. Autopsied bodies may need splints or dowels in the back to hold the head in place if the spine was removed.

== Procedures ==
Of the aesthetic preparations prior to embalming, the closure of the eyes, mouth, and lips are the most aesthetically obvious. There is a distinction between mouth closure and lip closure, the former meaning closure of the jaws, whilst the latter is closure of the lips and 'setting' the look of the mouth.

Eye closure

Though mouth and lip closures are usually done prior to arterial injection, eye closure can be done regardless of whether the body has had the arterial injection. Care is advised for bodies with communicable diseases such as herpes and special caution for eye discharges and fluids from victims of Creutzfeldt-Jacob disease.

The eyelids are massaged to relieve rigor mortis, and if necessary, are stretched to fully close the eyes. An eye cap is inserted underneath the lids to maintain the rounded contour of a normal eye and to keep the eyelids from opening. If the eye has collapsed due to decomposition, the eye cavity can be packed with cotton prior insertion of the eye cap. If the arterial injection does not sufficiently fill the eye cavity, an injection of embalming fluid under the lids will preserve the eyes followed by gluing the lids shut with rubber-based body glue.

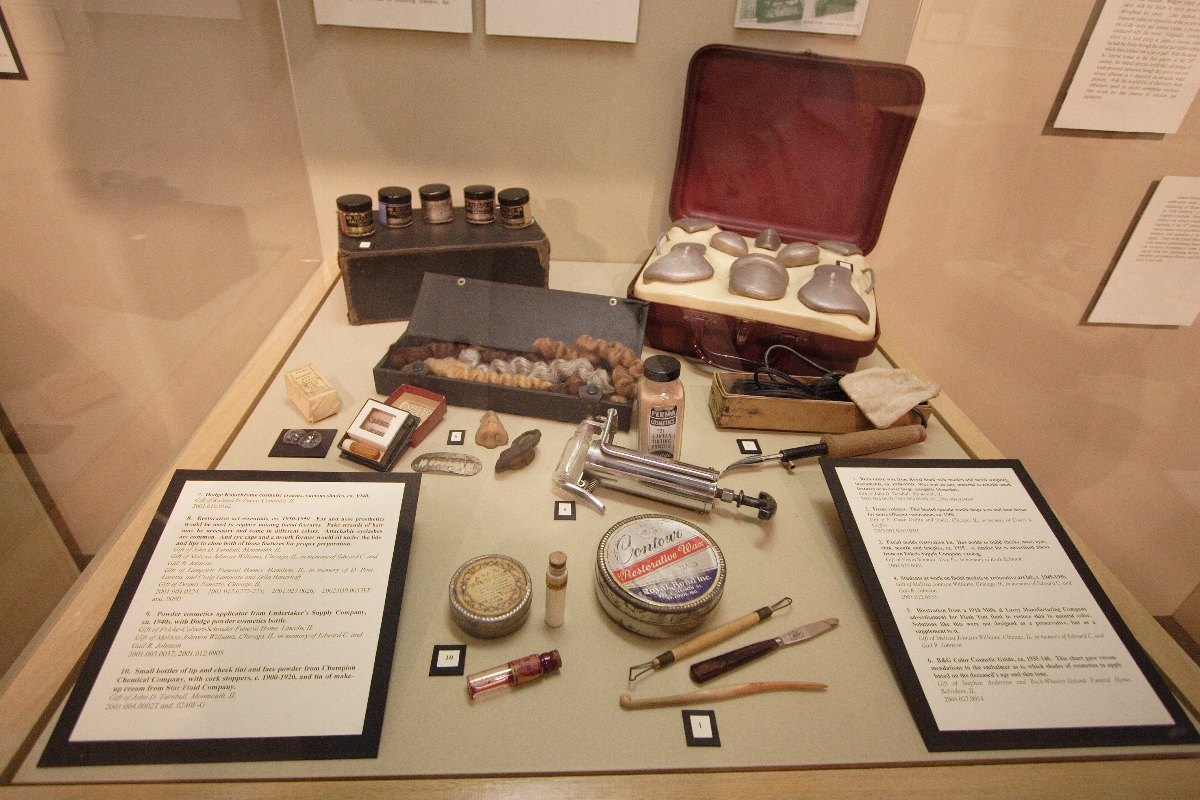
A mortician's restorative tools, amongst which includes eye caps and packing material for cavities, as well as smaller bottles of preserving fluid.

Mouth closure

Mouth closure is achieved through various methods. The body is first prepared by relieving rigor mortis, usually through massage. The oral and nasal cavities are swabbed clean, checked for any purge material, then the throat area is packed with cotton.

A common method of mouth closure is via needle injector. A needle with a barbed tip and with a wire attached is driven into the maxilla, behind the teeth, and another driven into the mandible. The two wires are then twisted together to bring the lower jaw up and close the mouth. In exceptions where the bone has atrophied or been fractured (as is the case with many denture users and automobile accident victims), a wire injection may require additional wires be set or sutures may be required.

In such cases, an embalmer will use a muscle suture. A needle and suture is drawn from the outer edge of the maxilla (the outer gums of the front teeth) into a nostril, pulled through the septum, and back down into the mouth. The needle then is pulled down to where the lower lip meets the mandible, pulled to the other side, and back up to meet with the hanging suture, at which point it is tied and the jaws are brought together. The sublingual suture is similar, exception being where the suture is drawn in the lower jaw, in the floor of the mouth as opposed to the front of the mandible, and this eliminates any unwanted dents in the skin of those with less flesh around the lower jaw.

Uncommonly, the lips may simply be sealed by use of cyanoacrylate, though this is reserved usually to the bodies of the young or infants.

Lip closure

After the mouth is closed, the cheeks may be padded to restore a normal contour, especially if the body is emaciated. The front of the mouth may also be padded to restore a normal contour, especially if the teeth are missing or sunken in. Once padded, the lips are held in position with petroleum jelly, rubber-based body glue, or cyanoacrylate in severe cases, prior to the arterial injection. The lips are sealed permanently after aerating the mouth cavity and after the embalmer confirms no blood or arterial fluid has leaked into the mouth.
