= Lying in repose =

Public funerary custom

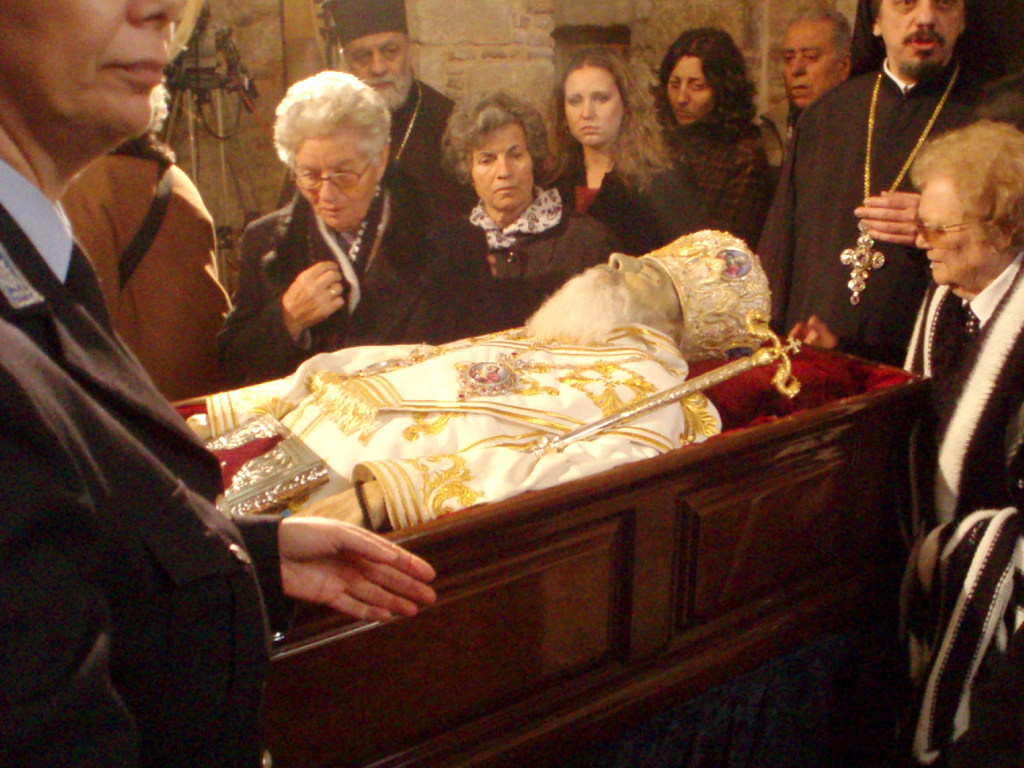
Archbishop Christodoulos of Athens lying in repose

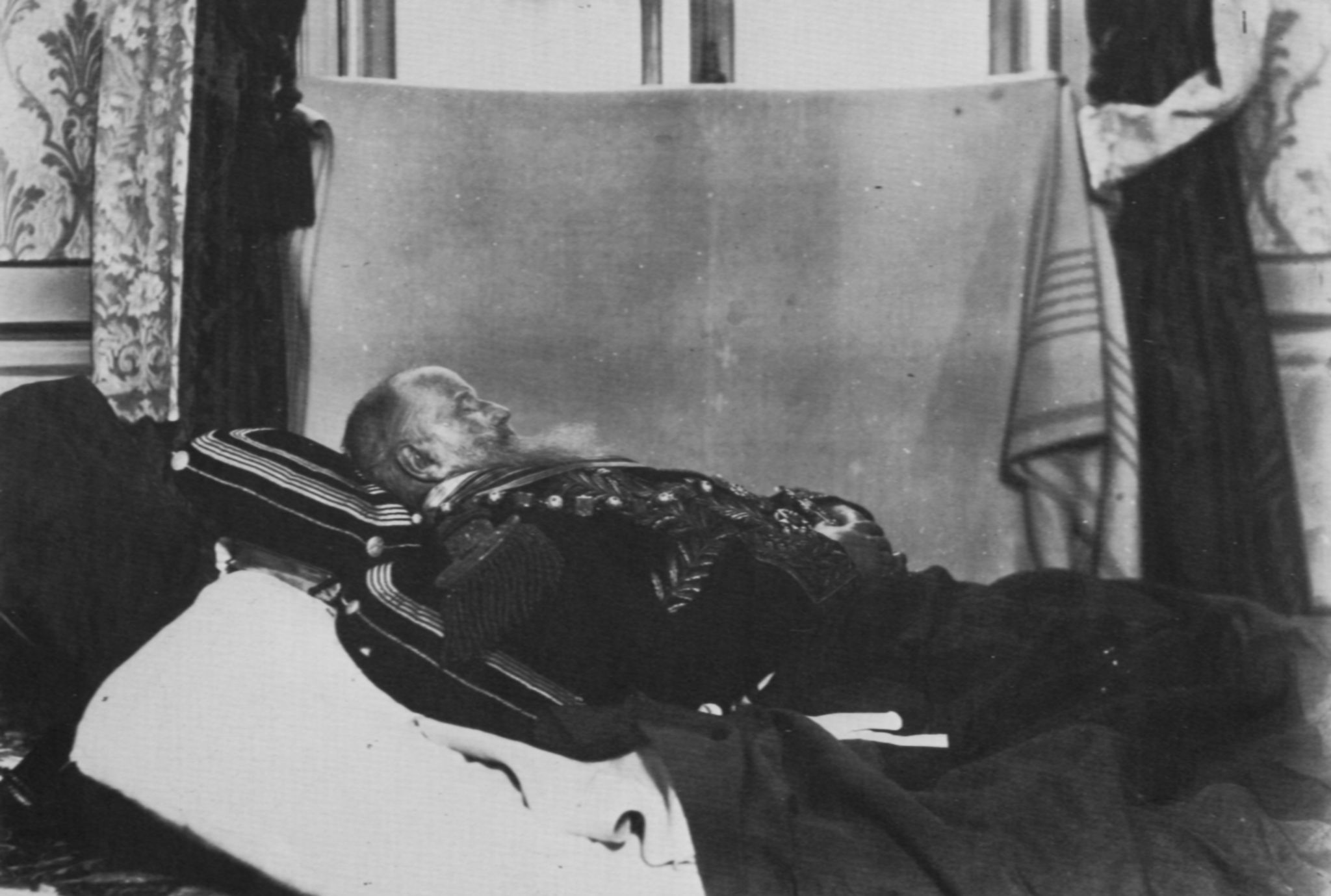
Emperor Pedro II of Brazil lying in repose in a room at the Hotel Bedford, Paris, 1891

Lying in repose is the tradition in which the body of a deceased person, often of high social stature, is made available for public viewing. Lying in repose differs from the more formal honor of lying in state, which is generally held at the principal government building of the deceased person's country and often accompanied by a guard of honour.

== United States ==
In the United States of America, "lying in state" is generally considered to be when one's body is placed in the rotunda of the United States Capitol. When the deceased person is placed in another location, like the Great Hall of the Supreme Court, they lie in repose, as was the case following the deaths of Justices Antonin Scalia in February 2016, Ruth Bader Ginsburg in September 2020, and Sandra Day O'Connor in December 2023.

The remains of presidents who die in office generally lie in repose in the East Room of the White House while those of a deceased former president generally lie in repose in his home state. However, as an example to the contrary, when the body of John F. Kennedy lay in repose, the term meant "private" as opposed to a public lying in state.

The body of Babe Ruth lay in repose in Yankee Stadium.

Not everyone eligible to lie in state in the Capitol Rotunda does so. For instance, the body of former President Richard Nixon lay in repose at the Richard Nixon Presidential Library in Yorba Linda, California, Senator Edward Kennedy's body lay in repose at the John F. Kennedy Library in Boston, Massachusetts, and Senator Robert Byrd's body lay in repose in the Senate chamber at the Capitol.

== Canada ==
In Canada, when deceased governors general and prime ministers lie anywhere outside of the Centre Block of Parliament Hill, they lie in repose. In the Hall of Honour, the Senate, or the foyer of the House of Commons, they lie in state.

At the provincial, territorial or local levels, current and former politicians may lie in state or repose in government buildings.

== Ireland ==
In Ireland the treatment of the dead has long been one of great respect. Catholic tradition has meant that virtually all deceased persons are afforded a state of repose, regardless of whether the funeral is conducted as a Catholic or secular service. The reposal of the body can either occur within a funeral home or at the deceased's residence (or the residence of close family). If conducted in a funeral home, this usually occurs for a few hours on the evening before the funeral service and burial/cremation. If conducted in a house, this can be extended from several hours to even days, depending on the tradition of the individual locality. Reposals are usually open to the general public and no invite is required. Reposals in Ireland are usually conducted with the corpse displayed in an open coffin, so that the body itself is on display. Exceptions to this can occur; such as in the case of the death of a child or young person, or if the body sustained significant physical damage upon death (in the case of a fatal accident, for example). It is typical, particularly in rural areas, for neighbours, extended family and friends to attend the reposal as an opportunity to pay their respects to the deceased, as well as to sympathise with the deceased's immediate family (sometimes referred to as "mourners"). In the funeral home setting, the mourners are generally standing or sitting around the open casket or coffin to shake hands and accept offers of sympathy from the public.

== See also ==
- Ancient Greek funeral and burial practices
- Caisson
- Catafalque
- Funeral train
- Missing man formation
- Riderless horse
- State funeral
- Vigil of the Princes
