= Martin van Butchell =

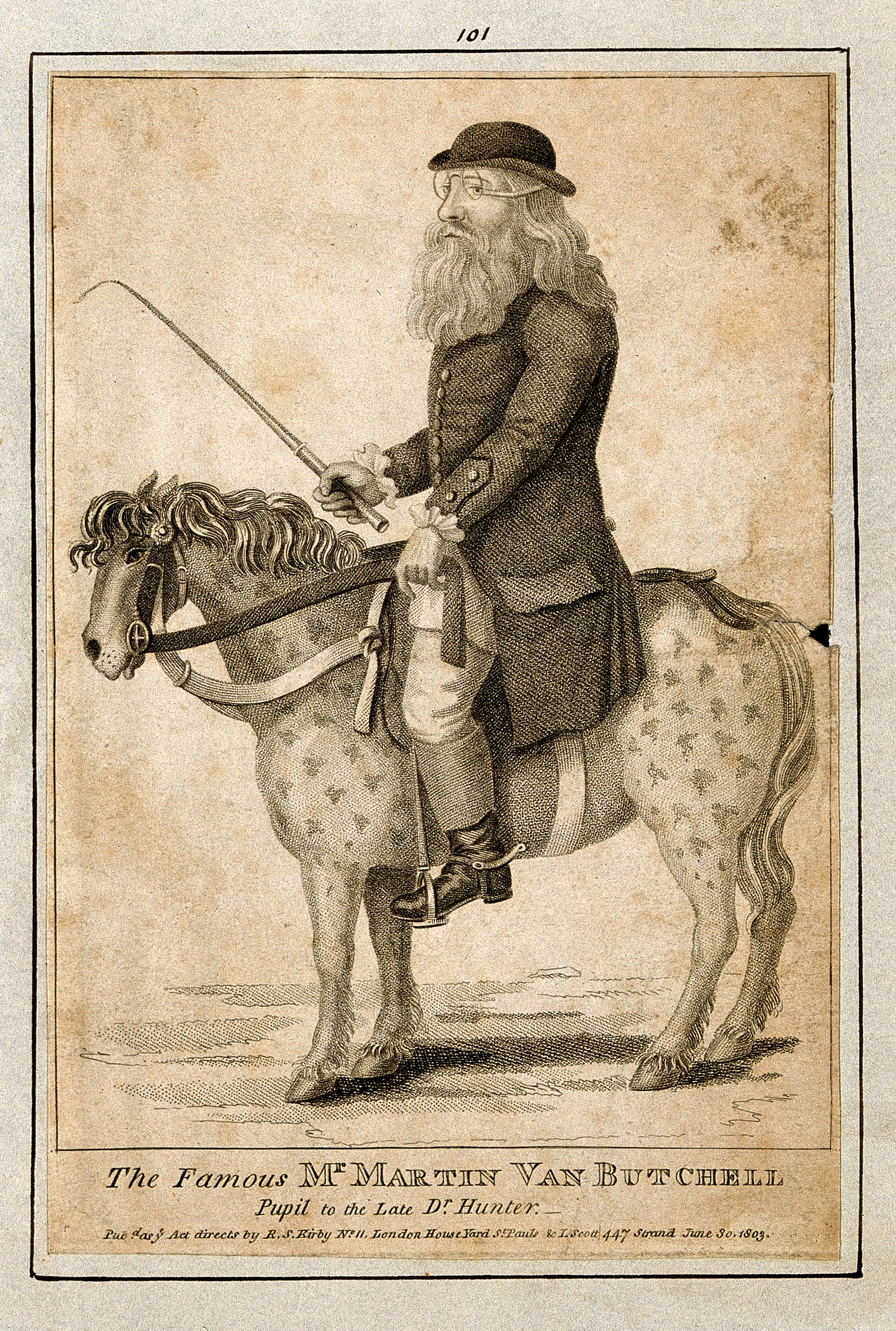
- Born: 1735
- Died: 1814
- Occupation: Quack dentist

Martin van Butchell (1735–1814) was an eccentric British dentist who put his dead wife on display, reputedly because of a clause in a marriage contract.

== Career ==
Butchell practised as a dental quack in the 1770s London and travelled around on a white pony, painted with purple spots.

He advertised in St. James's Chronicle with a text: "Real or Artificial Teeth from one to an entire set, with superlative gold pivots or springs, also gums, sockets and palate formed, fitted, finished and fixed without drawing stumps, or causing pain."

When his wife Mary died on 14 January 1775, he decided to have her embalmed and turn her into an attraction to draw more customers. He contacted his teacher of surgery and anatomy Dr. William Hunter and Dr. William Cruikshank who agreed to do the job.

Doctors injected the body with preservatives and color additives that gave a glow to the corpse's cheeks, replaced her eyes with glass eyes and dressed her in a fine lace gown. The body was then embedded in a layer of plaster of Paris in a glass-topped coffin.

Butchell put the body on display in the window of his home, which also housed his practice, and always referred to her as "my dearly departed". Many Londoners came to see the body but Butchell also drew criticism on his gruesome display. A rumour, possibly started by Butchell himself, claimed that a clause in their marriage certificate had provided income for Butchell as long as Mary was "above ground".

Eventually Butchell remarried and the new wife, Elizabeth, demanded that he remove the body of her predecessor from his window. Butchell gave the body to a brother of Dr. Hunter for his museum. The body ended up in the Royal College of Surgeons' museum.

The embalming was not very effective; the body begun to slowly deteriorate. In May 1941, the body of Mary Butchell was finally destroyed in a German bombing raid.
