= Springfield and Central Illinois African-American History Museum =

Museum of African-American history in Springfield

Coordinates: 39°49′12″N 89°39′12″W

- Location: 1440 Monument Avenue, Springfield, Illinois
- Type: African-American history
- Founder: Douglas King

The Springfield and Central Illinois African-American History Museum is a museum of African-American history and culture located in Springfield in the U.S. state of Illinois. The museum was founded in 2012 by historical educator Douglas King, and moved to a permanent location adjacent to Springfield's Oak Ridge Cemetery in March 2016. The history museum is located in the former home of the Museum of Funeral Customs, which closed permanently in 2009.

The museum celebrates the African-American history of Central Illinois. Exhibits and presentations include the presence of quasi-legal slavery in pioneer Springfield starting in 1819, the founding of the Pike County free village of New Philadelphia in 1836, and the construction of the Lincoln Colored Old Folks and Orphans Home in 1904. The museum and its volunteers have collected more than 700 oral histories of Central Illinoisans. The museum is backed and supported by the Springfield African American History Foundation.

The museum is located at 1440 Monument Avenue, Springfield, Ill.

== See also ==
- List of museums focused on African Americans
