= Embalming =

Method of preserving human remains

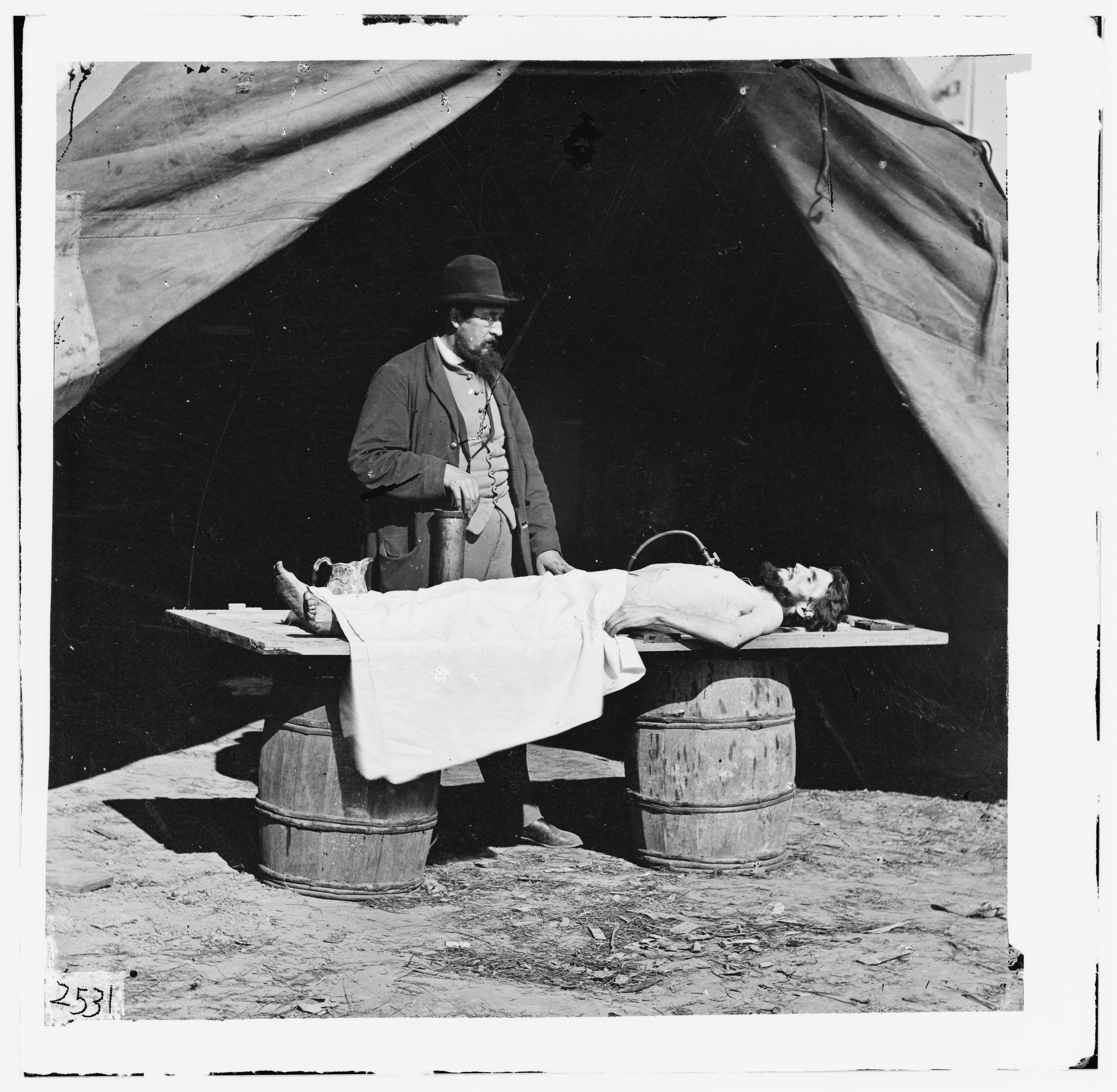
Embalming was popularized in the United States during the American Civil War.

Embalming is the art and science of preserving human remains by treating them with embalming chemicals in modern times to forestall decomposition. This is usually done to make the deceased suitable for viewing as part of the funeral ceremony or keep them preserved for medical purposes in an anatomical laboratory. The three goals of embalming are sanitization, presentation, and preservation, with restoration being an important additional factor in some instances. Performed successfully, embalming can help preserve the body for many years. Embalming has a long, cross-cultural history, with many cultures giving the embalming processes religious meaning.

Animal remains can also be embalmed by similar methods, though embalming is distinct from taxidermy. Embalming preserves the body while keeping it intact, whereas taxidermy is the recreation of an animal's form often using only the creature's skin, fur or feathers mounted on an anatomical form.

== History ==
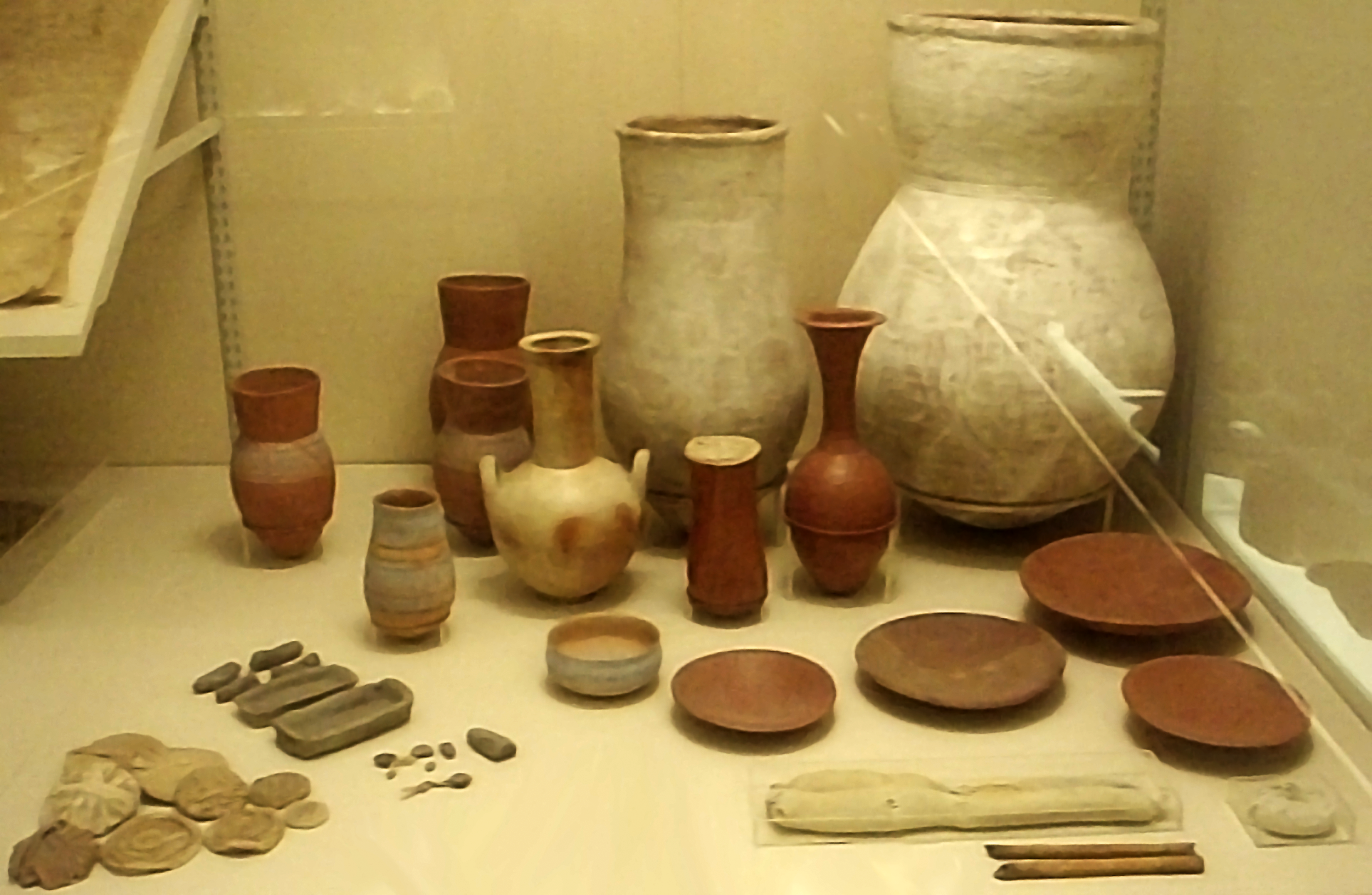
Pottery, dishes, and other miscellaneous items from the embalming cache of Tutankhamun

While the term embalming is used for both ancient and modern methods of preserving a deceased person, there is very little connection between the modern-day practices of embalming and ancient methods in terms of techniques or final aesthetic results.

The Chinchorro culture in the Atacama desert of present-day Chile and Peru is among the earliest cultures known to have performed artificial mummification, as early as 5000–6000 BCE. The earliest known evidence of artificial preservation in Europe was found in Osorno (Spain) – approximately 5000-year-old human bones covered in cinnabar for preservation – however embalming remained unusual in Europe up to the time of the Roman Empire.

Evidence of embalming practices in Egypt date to at least 3500 BCE. Ritual mummification, including embalming, continued to develop into a standardized practice in the dynastic period, and typically involved removing organs, ridding the body of moisture, and covering the body with natron, a mixture of desiccating salts found naturally in the Wadi El Natrun west of the Nile Delta. The ancient Egyptians believed that mummification enabled the soul to return to the preserved corpse after death. Other cultures known to have used embalming techniques in antiquity include the Meroites, Guanches, Peruvians, Jivaro Indians, Aztecs, Toltecs, Mayans, and Tibetan and southern Nigerian tribes.

In China, artificially preserved remains have been recovered from the period of the Han dynasty (206 BCE–220 CE), the main examples being those of Xin Zhui and the Mawangdui Han tombs site. While these remains have been extraordinarily well preserved, the embalming fluids and methods used are unknown.

In Europe the ancient practice of artificial preservation had become widespread by about 500 CE. The period of the Middle Ages and the Renaissance is known as the anatomists' period of embalming and is characterized by an increased influence of scientific developments in medicine and the need for bodies for dissection purposes. Early methods used are documented by contemporary physicians such as Peter Forestus (1522–1597) and Ambroise Pare (1510–1590). The first attempts to inject the vascular system were made by Alessandra Giliani, who died in 1326. Various attempts and procedures have been reported by Leonardo da Vinci (1452–1519), Jacobus Berengar (1470–1550), Bartholomeo Eustachius (1520–1574), Reinier de Graaf (1641–1673), Jan Swammerdam (1637–1680), and Frederik Ruysch (1638–1731).

=== Modern methods ===
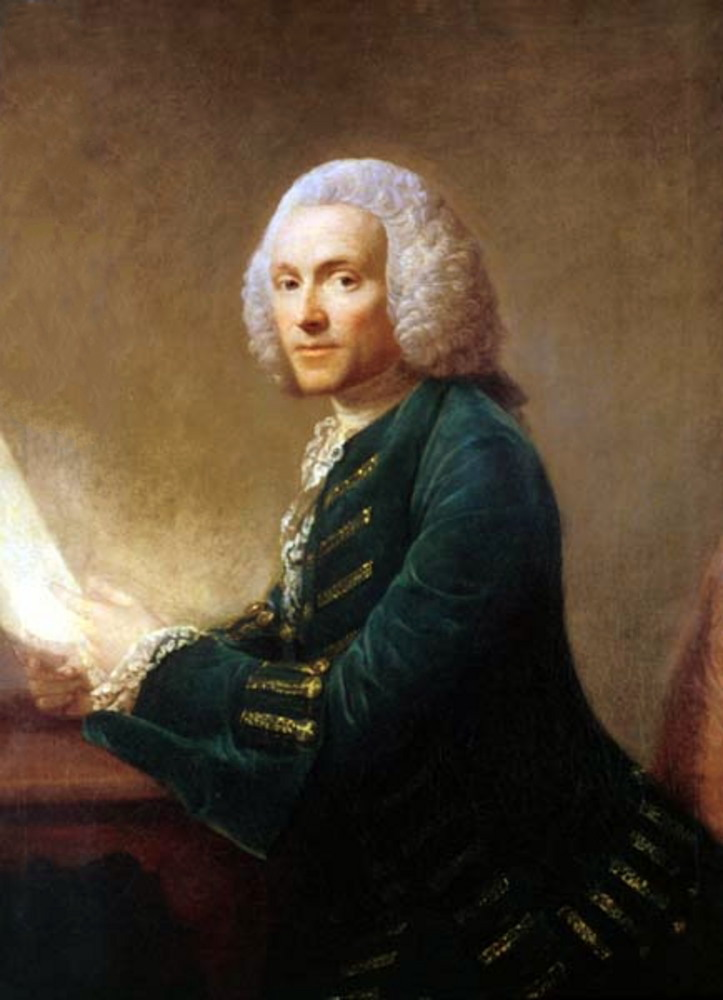
William Hunter developed and popularized the modern technique of arterial embalming in the late 18th century.

The modern method of embalming involves the injection of various chemical solutions into the arterial network of the body to primarily disinfect and slow the decomposition process. William Harvey, the 17th century English physician who was the first to detail the system of blood circulation, made his discoveries by injecting colored solutions into corpses.

The Scottish surgeon William Hunter was the first to apply these methods to the art of embalming as part of mortuary practice. He wrote a widely read report on the appropriate methods for arterial and cavity embalming in order to preserve bodies for burial. His brother, John Hunter, applied these methods and advertised his embalming services to the general public from the mid-18th century.

One of his more notorious clients was dentist Martin Van Butchell. When his wife Mary died on 14 January 1775, he had her embalmed as an attraction to draw more customers. Hunter injected the body with preservatives and color additives that gave a glow to the corpse's cheeks, replaced her eyes with glass eyes, and dressed her in a fine lace dress. The body was embedded in a layer of plaster of Paris in a glass-topped coffin. Butchell exhibited the body in the window of his home and many Londoners came to see it; however, Butchell drew criticism for the display. A rumor, possibly started by Butchell himself, claimed that his wife's marriage certificate had specified that her husband would only have control over her estate after her death for as long as her body was kept unburied.

Interest in, and demand for, embalming grew steadily in the 19th century largely for sentimental reasons. People sometimes wished to be buried at far-off locations, which became possible with the advent of the railways, and mourners wanted the chance to pay their last respects beside the displayed body. Other motives behind embalming were prevention of disease and the wish to prepare funerals and burials, which were becoming more elaborate, without undue haste. After Lord Nelson was killed in the Battle of Trafalgar, his body was preserved in brandy and spirits of wine mixed with camphor and myrrh for over two months. At the time of his state funeral in 1805, his body was found to still be in excellent condition and completely plastic.

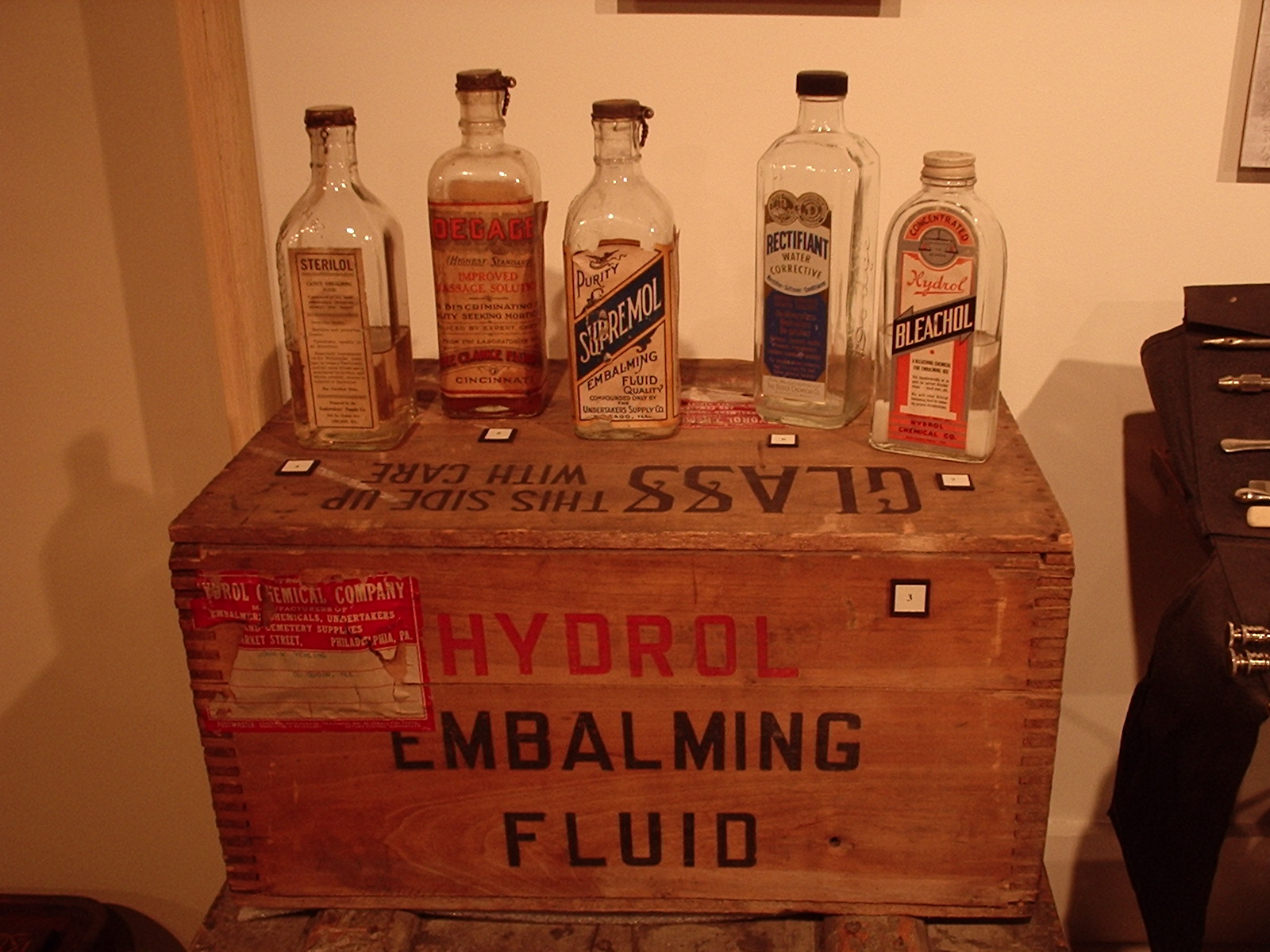
Embalming fluids used in the early 20th century

Alternative methods of preservation, such as ice packing or laying the body on so called 'cooling boards', gradually lost ground to the increasingly popular and effective methods of embalming. By the mid-19th century, the newly emerging profession of businessmen-undertakers – who provided funeral and burial services – began adopting embalming methods as standard.

Embalming became more common in the United States during the American Civil War, when servicemen often died far from home. The wish of families for their remains to be returned home for local burial and lengthy transport from the battlefield helped it become popular.

The period from about 1861 is sometimes known as the funeral period of embalming and is marked by a separation of the fields of embalming by undertakers and embalming (anatomical wetting) for medical and scientific purposes. Dr Thomas Holmes received a commission from the Army Medical Corps to embalm the corpses of dead Union officers to return to their families. Military authorities also permitted private embalmers to work in military-controlled areas. The passage of Abraham Lincoln's body home for burial was made possible by embalming, and it brought wider public attention to the possibilities and potential of embalming.

Until the early 20th century, embalming fluids often contained arsenic until it was supplanted by more effective and less toxic chemicals. There was concern about the possibility of arsenic from embalmed bodies contaminating ground water supplies, as well as legal concerns that people suspected of murder by arsenic poisoning might claim that levels of poison in the deceased's body were the result of post-mortem embalming, not homicide.

In 1855, the Russian chemist Alexander Michailowitsch Butlerow discovered formaldehyde, the preservative properties of which were soon noted, and it became the foundation for modern methods of embalming.

Dr Frederic Ruysch was the first to have used the arterial injection method for embalming. His work of embalming was so nearly perfect that people thought the dead body was actually alive; however, he only used it to prepare specimens for his anatomical work.

=== Present day ===
Modern embalming is most often performed to ensure a better presentation of the deceased for viewing by friends and relatives. It is also used for medical research or training, transportation of deceased, especially across national borders, and in many instances for above ground burial in a vault or mausoleum.

A successful viewing of the body is considered to be helpful in the grieving process. Embalming has the potential to prevent mourners from having to deal with the decomposition and eventual putrescence of the body. Despite a common misconception, embalming is not mandatory in the United States, although it is a general legal requirement for international repatriation of human remains to the U.S. (exceptions do occur).

There are no universal international preservation requirements for repatriation of human remains, but requirements for embalming do exist for a variety of countries depending on locality and circumstance. Some international standards do exist however, such as the Strasbourg Agreement of the Council of Europe, agreed to by more than 20 States in Europe, which only requires embalming in cases where the individual died due to an infectious disease.

== Terms for embalmers ==
An embalmer is someone who has been trained and qualified in the art and science of sanitization, presentation, and preservation of the human deceased. The term mortician is far more generic; it may refer to someone who is a funeral director, an embalmer, or just a person who prepares the deceased, with or without the formal qualification of an embalmer. Thus while all embalmers are morticians, many morticians are not embalmers and the terms are not intrinsically synonymous.

Embalming training commonly involves formal study in anatomy, thanatology, chemistry, and specific embalming theory (to widely varied levels depending on the region of the world one lives in) combined with practical instruction in a mortuary with a resultant formal qualification granted after the passing of a final practical examination and acceptance into a recognized society of professional embalmers. The roles of a funeral director and embalmer are different, depending on local customs and the licensing body of the region in which they both operate. A funeral director arranges for the final disposition of the deceased, and may or may not prepare the deceased (by embalming, preparing for viewing or other legal requirements).

Legal requirements over who can practice vary geographically. Some regions or countries do not have specific requirements, while others have clear prohibitions. In the United States, the title of an embalmer is largely based on the state in which they are licensed. Additionally, in many places, embalming is not done by specialist embalmers, but rather by doctors, medical technicians or laboratory technicians who, while they have the required anatomical or chemical knowledge, are not trained specialists in this field. Today, embalming is a common practice in North America, Australia, New Zealand, Britain and Ireland, while it is much less frequent in many parts of Europe; most modern countries have embalming available in some manner.

== Modern practices ==
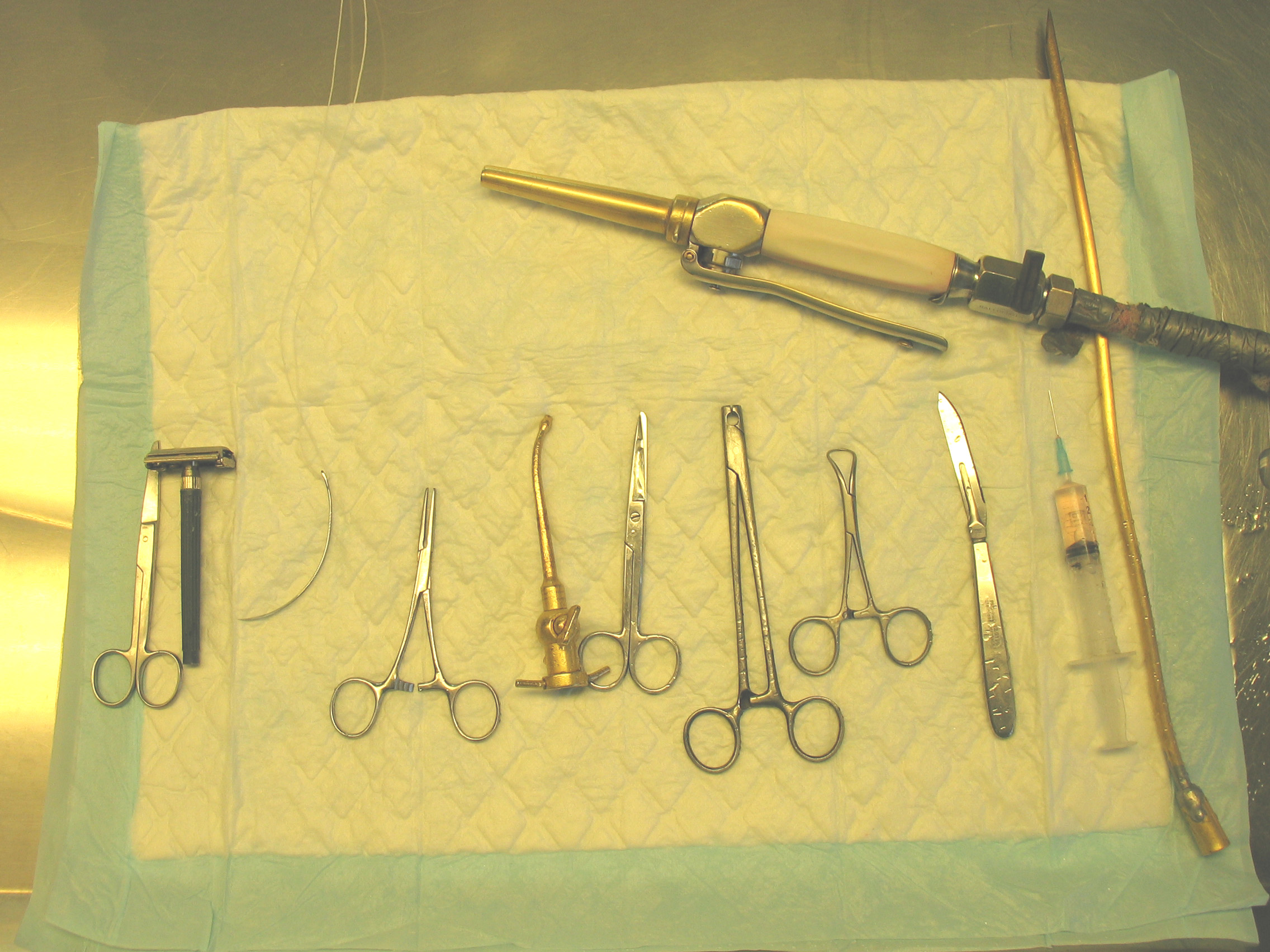
Instruments used for embalming

As practiced in the funeral home, embalming involves several distinct steps. Modern embalming techniques are not the result of a single practitioner, but rather the accumulation of many decades, even centuries, of research, trial and error, and invention. A standardized version follows below, but variation in techniques are common.

The first step in embalming is to verify the permissions and requests of the family followed by a careful plan for the deceased's preparation, including reviewing the medical certificate of death. The deceased is placed on the mortuary table in the supine anatomical position with the head elevated by a head rest. Before commencing any preparation the embalmer will verify the identity of the body (normally via wrist or leg bracelets or tags). At this point, embalmers commonly perform an initial evaluation of the deceased's condition, noting things such as rigor mortis, skin condition, edema, intravenous injection sites, presence of fecal matter, tissue gas and numerous other factors which may affect the procedure and outcome. The embalming procedure is a surgical one, albeit rather minimally invasive. The process requires significant effort over the course of multiple hours, including intensive planning, evaluation, and chemical selection.

Any clothing on the body is removed and set aside, and any personal effects such as jewelry are inventoried. A modesty cloth is commonly placed over the genitalia. The body is washed in a germicidal soap. During this process the embalmer bends, flexes, and massages the arms and legs to relieve rigor mortis. The eyes are posed using an eye cap that keeps them shut and in the proper expression. The mouth may be closed via suturing with a needle and ligature, using an adhesive, or by setting a wire into the maxilla and mandible with a needle injector, a specialized device most commonly used in North America and unique to mortuary practice. Care is taken to make the expression look as relaxed and natural as possible, and ideally, a recent photograph of the deceased in good health is used as a reference. The process of closing the mouth and eyes, shaving, etc. is collectively known as setting the features. Features may also be set after the completion of the arterial embalming process, which allows the embalmer to clean and remove any purge that occurs during the embalming process.

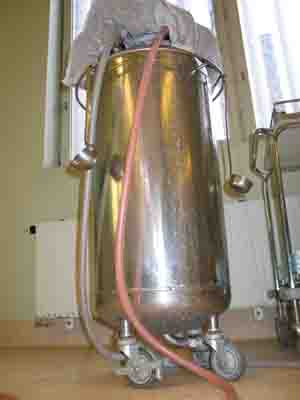
Tank containing embalming fluid

The actual embalming process usually involves four parts:

1. Arterial embalming, which involves the injection of embalming chemicals into the blood vessels, usually via the right common carotid artery. Blood and interstitial fluids are displaced by this injection and, along with excess arterial solution, are expelled from the right jugular vein and collectively referred to as drainage. The embalming solution is injected with a centrifugal pump, and the embalmer massages the body to break up circulatory clots so as to ensure the proper distribution of the embalming solution. This process of raising vessels with injection and drainage from a solitary location is known as a single-point injection. In cases of poor circulation of the arterial solution, additional injection points (commonly the axillary, brachial, or femoral arteries, with the ulnar, radial, and tibial vessels if necessary) are used. Cases where more than one vessel is raised are referred to as multi-point injection, with a reference to the number of vessels raised (i.e. a six-point injection or six-pointer). As a general rule, the more points needing to be raised, the greater the difficulty of the case. In some cases draining from a different site from injection (i.e. injecting arterial fluid into the right common carotid artery and draining from the right femoral vein) is referred to as a split (or sometimes cut) injection. In certain cases the embalmer may deem it necessary to perform a restricted cervical injection, which involves injecting the head of the deceased separately from the rest of body. This is done in cases where distention (swelling) has a greater chance of occurring. In many cases, an embalmer may select to perform what is known as a pre-injection. A pre-injection is a solution of chemicals that do not contain any preservative chemicals, but rather chemicals that encourage vasodilation, help disperse blood clots, and act as chelating agents. The focus of this "pre-injection" is to allow for a more complete drainage and better distribution of the arterial embalming solution.
2. Cavity treatment/embalming refers to the removal of internal fluids inside body cavities via the use of an aspirator and trocar. The embalmer pushes the trocar through the abdominal wall near the navel (two inches superior and two inches to the right) and into the abdominal and chest cavities. This first punctures the hollow organs and aspirates their contents. The embalmer then fills the cavities with concentrated chemicals (known as cavity chemicals) that may contain formaldehyde, which are delivered to the chest cavity via the trocar inserted through the diaphragm. The incision is either sutured closed (commonly using the purse-string or 'N' suture methods) or a "trocar button" is secured into place.
3. Hypodermic embalming is a supplemental method which refers to the injection of embalming chemicals into tissue with a hypodermic needle and syringe, which is generally used as needed on a case-by-case basis to treat areas where arterial fluid has not been successfully distributed during the main arterial injection.
4. Surface embalming, another supplemental method, utilizes embalming chemicals to preserve and restore areas directly on the skin's surface and other superficial areas as well as areas of damage such as from accident, decomposition, cancerous growths, or skin donation.

There are many further miscellaneous procedures. For example, pacemakers are required to be removed if the body is to be cremated as the battery inside can explode and damage the cremator. Such are removed with one incision over the device, after which it may be extracted and discarded of properly.

Surgical incisions are treated depending on their location and stage of healing. If the sutures are recent, a solution of phenol or other preservative chemicals is injected into the margins and the area disinfected. Metal sutures are removed after arterial injection, and the incision then tightly sutured with a running stitch. Sealing powder can be applied to protect against leakage, and glue is then applied over the surface of the incision. If the suture is visible, cyanoacrylate and/or a restorative suture is used.

For feeding and breathing tubes, the skin around them may be destroyed and dented, and an embalmer may choose to use tissue builder or wax filler to restore the look and contour of the skin. Tracheotomy holes are left until after embalming as an outlet for purge before being permanently sealed, though they are closed with a saturated cotton ball to disinfect the opening and to contain any leakage during the arterial injection.

Abdominal feeding tubes are removed either before or after the arterial injection, and a piece of cotton saturated with phenol used to stop the hole. Sutures may also be used to close the hole.

Holes left by intravenous tubes can be left by the embalmer until after the arterial injection, and filler used to restore the contour of the skin.

Blisters and sores are opened and drained, and fractured bones are aligned to look as if in a normal state. The embalmer may perform small incisions to align smaller fragments, and irregularities that cannot be smoothed out see the bone fragment removed and filled with wax or putty.

The duration of an embalming can vary greatly, but a common approximate time of between two and four hours to complete an embalming is typical. However, an embalming case that presents excessive complications could require substantially longer. The treatment of someone who has undergone an autopsy, cases of extreme trauma, or the restoration of a long-bone donor are a few such examples, and some embalmings may take several days to complete.

Embalming is meant to temporarily preserve the body of a deceased person. Regardless of whether embalming is performed, the type of burial or entombment, and the materials used – such as wood or metal coffins and vaults – the body of the deceased will, under most circumstances, eventually decompose. Modern embalming is done to improve the appearance of the deceased and delay decomposition so that funeral services may take place or for the purpose of shipping the remains to a distant place for disposition.

=== Instruments ===
==== Aneurysm Hook ====
An aneurysm hook is a tool utilized by embalmers when raising vessels for injection. When raising, the embalmer will need to locate the vessel which requires dissecting the tissue after incising the skin. The hook is used to pull apart tissue and bluntly dissect. The embalmer may wield one in each hand or have one hand free to assist with dissection. It is common for embalmers to sometimes forgo using a hook to better feel for the vessel buried within the tissue.

==== Embalming Machine ====
An embalming machine is used to mix, pressurize, and inject embalming solution. Embalming solution is different to embalming fluid. Solution (also called arterial fluid) refers to the mix of preservative chemicals, supplemental fluid, and water housed in the machine — this is what is injected into the body. Fluid refers to the preservative chemicals put into the machine and mixed with other fluids.

==== Trocar ====
A trocar is a long metallic rod with a sharp end used to aspirate cavities. This is done to remove bodily fluids and intestinal substance that causes more decomposition. It is inserted through the abdominal wall two inches superior and two inches to the right of the navel.

A hypovalve trocar is used to introduce embalming solution into tissue when the circulatory system has failed. This is referred to as hypodermic embalming.

==== Ligature ====
Ligature (string) is used to ligate and wrap vessels. This is done to organize and have better manipulation of vessels. It is helpful to ligate a vessel when inserting a cannula for injection. Some embalmers use a different color of ligature for the vein than they would the artery.

Ligature is also used when closing the mouth. It is used with a needle to weave string through tissue in the mouth. It is channeled through tissue in the bottom lip. It is then pushed through the upper lip into one nasal cavity then pushed through the septum into the other cavity. It is then pushed back through the lip and the embalmer will tie the two ends of string together.

Ligature is also used to suture. It can close an incision and be used to help restore trauma like a lesion.

==== Eye Caps ====
Eye caps are used when setting the facial features to close the eyes. They are plastic and dome-shaped with sharp protrusions on the convex surface to help shape the eyes and keep them closed.

Similarly, mouth formers are used to help shape the mouth. They are usually applied when there are no teeth to shape the lips.

==== Needle Injector ====
A needle injector is used when setting the facial features to close the mouth. It implants metal pins into the maxilla and mandible. The pins have wires attached that are twisted together to keep the mouth from opening.

== Grooming ==
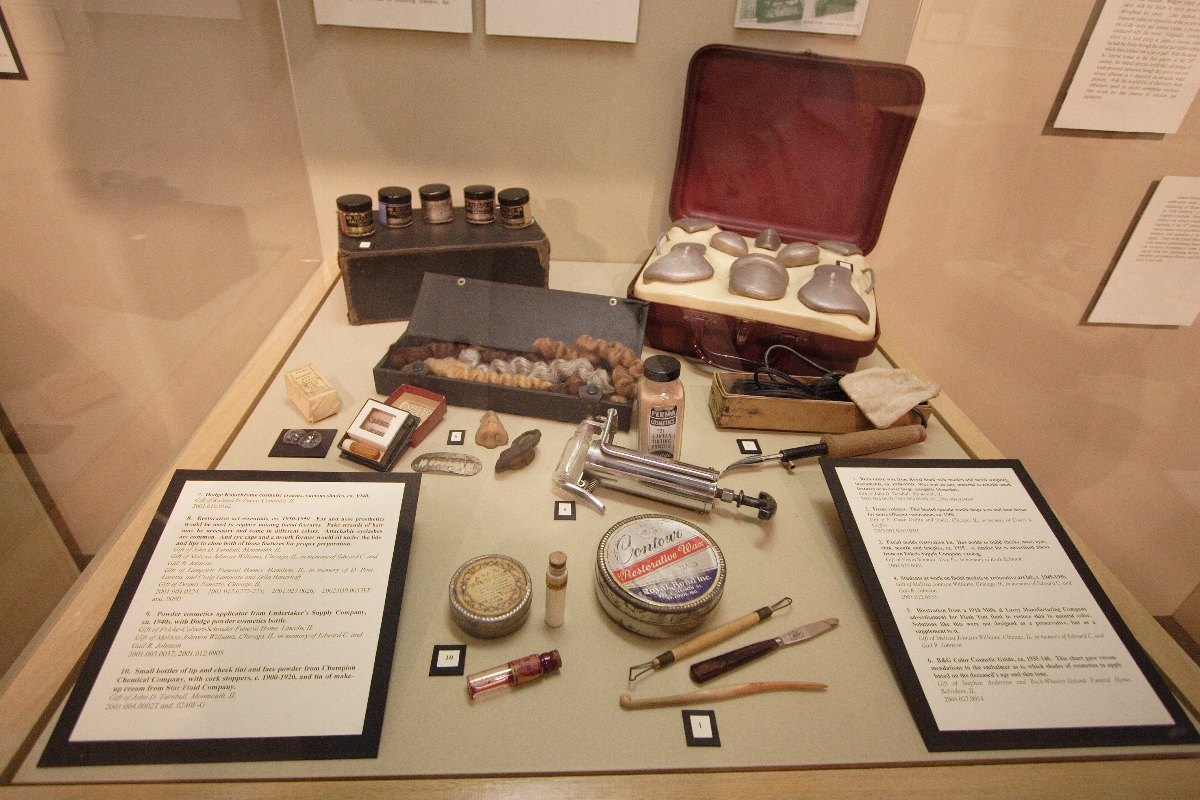
Restoration tools, Museum of Funeral Customs

Every case is different, and different embalming professionals work in different ways. Common grooming practices may include combing and styling the hair and applying cream or emollient spray to the skin to maintain hydration. The deceased will then be dressed and makeup may be applied to mimic natural coloring or the deceased person's typical styling. Hair gel or baby oil is applied to style short hair; while hairspray is applied to style long hair. Powders (especially baby powder) are applied to the body to eliminate odors, and it is also applied to the face to achieve a matte and fresh effect to prevent oiliness of the corpse. Makeup techniques may include using an airbrush to evenly apply product, using mascara to add volume to eyelashes, filling in eyebrows with pencil, and using lipstick or gloss to add color to the lips. Mortuary cosmeticizing is not done for the same reason as make-up for living people; rather, it is designed to add depth and dimension to a person's features that lack of blood circulation has removed. Warm areas – where blood vessels in living people are superficial, such as the cheeks, chin, and knuckles – have subtle reds added to recreate this effect, while browns are added to the palpebrae (eyelids) to add depth, especially important as viewing in a coffin creates an unusual perspective rarely seen in everyday life. During the viewing, pink-colored lighting is sometimes used near the body to lend a warmer tone to the deceased's complexion.

A photograph of the deceased in good health is often sought to guide the embalmer's hand in restoring the body to a more lifelike appearance. Blemishes and discolorations (such as bruises, in which the discoloration is not in the circulatory system, and cannot be removed by arterial injection) occasioned by the last illness, the settling of blood, or the embalming process itself are also dealt with at this time (although some embalmers utilize hypodermic bleaching agents, such as phenol-based cauterants, during injection to lighten discoloration and allow easier cosmeticizing). It is also common for the embalmer to perform minor restoration of the deceased's appearance with tissue building chemicals and a hypodermic syringe. Tissue building chemicals (Tissue Builders) become solid with the introduction of liquids such as water or interstitial fluids. Commonly the area where the sphenoid and temporal bones meet; this can also be referred to the temples. In the event of trauma or natural depressions on the face or hands, tissue builder can also be utilised to return those regions of the face to the expectations of the family.

== Clothing ==
As with all funeral practises local custom, culture, religion and family request are the key determiners of clothing for the deceased. In the Western world, men are usually buried in business attire, such as a suit or coat and tie, and women in semi-formal dresses or pant suits. In recent years, a change has occurred, and many individuals are now buried in less formal clothing, such as what they would have worn on a daily basis, or other favorite attire. The clothing used can also reflect the deceased person's profession or vocation: priests and ministers are often dressed in their liturgical vestments, and military and law enforcement personnel often wear their uniform. Underwear, singlets, bras, briefs, and hosiery are all used if the family so desires, and the deceased is dressed in them as they would be in life.

In certain instances a funeral director will request a specific style of clothing, such as a collared shirt or blouse, to cover traumatic marks or autopsy incisions. In other cases clothing may be cut down the back and placed on the deceased from the front to ensure a proper fit. In many areas of Asia and Europe, the custom of dressing the body in a specially designed shroud or burial cloth, rather than in clothing used by the living, is preferred.

After the deceased has been dressed, they are generally placed in their coffin or casket. In American English, the word coffin is used to refer to an anthropoid (stretched hexagonal) form, whereas casket refers specifically to a rectangular coffin. It is common for photographs, notes, cards, and favourite personal items to be placed in the coffin with the deceased. Bulky and expensive items, such as electric guitars, are occasionally interred with a body. In some ways this mirrors the ancient practice of placing grave goods with a person for their use or enjoyment in the afterlife. In traditional Chinese culture, paper substitutes of the goods are buried or cremated with the deceased instead, as well as paper money specifically purchased for the occasion.

== Chemicals ==
Embalming chemicals are a variety of preservatives, sanitizers, disinfectant agents, and additives used in modern embalming to temporarily delay decomposition and restore a natural appearance for viewing a body after death. A mixture of these chemicals is known as embalming solution, and is used to preserve deceased individuals, sometimes only until the funeral, other times indefinitely.

Typical embalming solution contains a mixture of formaldehyde, glutaraldehyde, methanol, humectants and wetting agents, and other solvents that can be used. The formaldehyde content generally ranges from 5–35%, and the methanol content may range from 9–56%.

Environmentalists sometimes have concerns about embalming because of the harmful chemicals involved and their potential interactions with the environment. Recently, more eco-friendly embalming methods have become available, including formaldehyde-free mixtures of chemicals.

== Specialist embalming ==
Badly decomposing bodies, trauma cases, frozen, or drowned bodies, and those to be transported over long distances also require special treatment beyond that for the "normal" case. The restoration of bodies and features damaged by accident or disease is commonly called restorative art or demisurgery, and all qualified embalmers have some degree of training and practice in it. For such cases, the benefit of embalming is startlingly apparent. Normally, a better result can be achieved when a photograph and the decedent's regular make-up (if worn) are available to help make the deceased appear more as they did when alive.

Embalming autopsy cases differs from standard embalming because the nature of the post-mortem examination irrevocably disrupts the circulatory system, due to the removal of the organs and viscera. In these cases, a six-point injection is made through the two iliac or femoral arteries, subclavian or axillary vessels, and common carotids, with the viscera treated separately with cavity fluid or a special embalming powder in a viscera bag.

Long-term preservation requires different techniques, such as using stronger preservatives and multiple injection sites to ensure thorough saturation of body tissues.

== For anatomy education ==
A rather different process is used for cadavers embalmed for dissection by medical professionals, students, and researchers. Here, the first priority is for long-term preservation, not presentation. As such, medical embalmers use anatomical wetting fluids that contain concentrated formaldehyde (37–40%, known as formalin) or glutaraldehyde and phenol, and are made without dyes or perfumes. Many embalming chemical companies make specialized anatomical embalming fluids.

Anatomical embalming is performed into a closed circulatory system. The solution is usually injected with an embalming machine into an artery under high pressure and flow, and allowed to swell and saturate the tissues. After the deceased is left to sit for a number of hours, the venous system is generally opened and the solution allowed to drain out, although many anatomical embalmers do not use any drainage technique.

Anatomical embalmers may choose to use gravity-feed embalming, where the container dispensing the embalming solution is elevated above the body's level, and solution is slowly introduced over an extended time, sometimes as long as several days. Unlike standard arterial embalming, no drainage occurs, and the body distends extensively with solution. The distension eventually reduces, often under extended (up to six months) refrigeration, leaving a fairly normal appearance. No separate cavity treatment of the internal organs is given. Anatomically embalmed cadavers have a typically uniform grey colouration, due both to the high formaldehyde concentration mixed with the blood and the lack of red colouration agents commonly added to standard, nonmedical, embalming fluids. Formaldehyde mixed with blood causes the grey discoloration also known as "formaldehyde grey" or "embalmer's grey".

A new embalming technique developed gradually since the 1960s by anatomist Walter Thiel at the Graz Anatomy Institute in Austria has been the subject of various academic papers, as the cadaver retains the body's natural color, texture and plasticity after the process. The method uses 4-chloro-3-methylphenol and various salts for fixation, boric acid for disinfection, and ethylene glycol for the preservation of tissue plasticity. The embalmed cadavers are used in anatomical research, surgical and anaesthesia training, preoperative test procedures, CT image quality studies.

== Religious practices ==
Opinions differ among different faiths as to the permissibility of embalming. A brief overview of some of the larger faiths’ positions is as follows:

- Most branches and denominations of the Christian faith allow embalming. Some bodies within Eastern Orthodoxy profess an absolute ban on embalming except when required by law or other necessity, while others may discourage but do not prohibit it. In most Christian denominations, the decision on embalming is the preference of the deceased's family rather than for church policy or theological viewpoint.
- The Church of Jesus Christ of Latter-day Saints does not discourage or prohibit embalming. Often, due to the custom of church members dressing the deceased, embalming is given preference.
- Some Neopagans discourage embalming, believing it unnatural to disrupt the physical recycling of the body to the Earth.
- Members of the Bahá'í Faith are not embalmed. Instead, the body is washed and then placed in a cotton, linen, or silk shroud.
- Zoroastrians traditionally hold a type of sky burial within a structure known as a Tower of Silence in which the body is exposed to weathering and predation to dispose of the remains. Embalming the body is thus contrary to their funeral designs.
- Traditional Jewish law forbids embalming. Burial is to be done as soon as possible; preferably within 24 hours.
- Embalming is not a standard practice in Hinduism. The body is usually cremated as soon as possible, preferably within 24 hours, except when the offspring of the deceased need time to get to the location (in which case the body is refrigerated).
- In Islam, embalming of the dead is not practiced, except in cases of necessity, such as when a body is being transported internationally and the law requires it to be embalmed. Muslims bury their deceased without delay (preferably within 24 hours), to allow the soul to transition to the afterlife as soon as possible.
- Buddhists generally do not favor embalming, but it is not strictly prohibited in most Buddhist traditions. The practice of embalming varies among different Buddhist schools and cultures. In Theravada Buddhism, embalming is allowed but not considered essential. However, in Tibetan Buddhism, embalming is typically discouraged and should not take place.

The increasingly global nature of communities and far longer delays between death and final disposition caused by modern requirements and often distant families mean that embalming is frequently required either by law or common sense due to issues of transportation and holding requirement. Thus most religious authorities relent to its necessity in specific circumstances. An alternative in this case is cremation, which may or may not involve embalming.

== Notable embalmings ==
- Lord Nelson (1758–1805) was preserved for two months in brandy and spirits of wine mixed with camphor and myrrh after which time the body was found to be in excellent condition and completely plastic.
- Various communist leaders have been embalmed and put on public display. Perhaps the most famous embalmed body of the 20th century is that of Vladimir Lenin, which continues to draw crowds decades after his death in 1924, and is seen in his Moscow mausoleum. Joseph Stalin was also embalmed and placed next to Lenin, but his body was buried in 1961 during de-Stalinization. Klement Gottwald of Czechoslovakia, who died just five days after attending Stalin's funeral, was embalmed and displayed in a mausoleum at National Monument in Vitkov in Prague. However, in 1962 due to political reasons, the body was removed and cremated. Bulgarian Georgi Dimitrov was embalmed and placed on display in the Sofia Georgi Dimitrov Mausoleum. After the fall of Communism in Bulgaria, his body was buried in 1990 in the Central cemetery of Sofia. Mongolia's Khorloogiin Choibalsan, Angola's Agostinho Neto, Romania's Gheorghe Gheorghiu-Dej and Guyana's Forbes Burnham were also embalmed by the same Russian team. Currently, embalmed communist leaders can also be found in the Mausoleum of Mao Zedong, the Ho Chi Minh Mausoleum, and the Kumsusan Palace of the Sun for Kim Il Sung and Kim Jong Il.
- The botched embalming of Pope Pius XII (1876–1958; pope 1939–1958) by a charlatan doctor – which only sped up the rate of decomposition – led to his body turning black and his nose falling off while lying in state, and the body disintegrated in the coffin. The Swiss Guards stationed around Pius XII's body were forced to change shifts every 10 to 15 minutes, since the body's odor caused some guards to pass out. The doctor who performed the embalming had also taken photos of the pontiff in his death throes, intending to sell them to tabloids. The Italian tabloids refused to buy the photos, and the doctor was banned from entering the Vatican City-State by John XXIII, who furthermore prohibited any photography of a deceased pope until the body is properly vested and laid out.
- Charles XII (1682–1718) is one of several Swedish kings to have been embalmed. When Charles XII's sarcophagus was opened in 1917, his features were still recognizable, almost 200 years after his death. Photographs of his remains clearly show the gunshot wound to his head leading to his death.
- The body of Pope John XXIII (1881–1963; pope 1958–1963) is on display on an altar on the main floor of the Basilica of Saint Peter after having been exhumed from the grottoes beneath the main altar and has retained an extremely well-preserved state. If a body's remains do not decompose, contrary to expectations, it is often treated as a miracle. However, the case of John XXIII's body did not enjoy the same acclamation, as it was held to have been due to embalming and adipocere formation.
- The body of Pope Pius X (1835–1914; pope 1903–1914) lies in a crystal coffin, in the Chapel of the Presentation of the Virgin Mary. On 17 February 1952, Pius X's body was transferred from the crypt of the Vatican grotto. The body is dressed in pontifical robes, while the face and hands are covered with silver. He lies within a glass and bronze-work sarcophagus for the faithful to see. Papal physicians had been in the habit of removing organs to aid the embalming process. Pius X expressly prohibited this, however, and none of his successors has allowed the practice to be reinstituted.
- Murdered civil rights activist Medgar Evers was so well embalmed that a valid autopsy was able to be performed on his corpse decades after his death, and this helped secure the conviction of his killer.

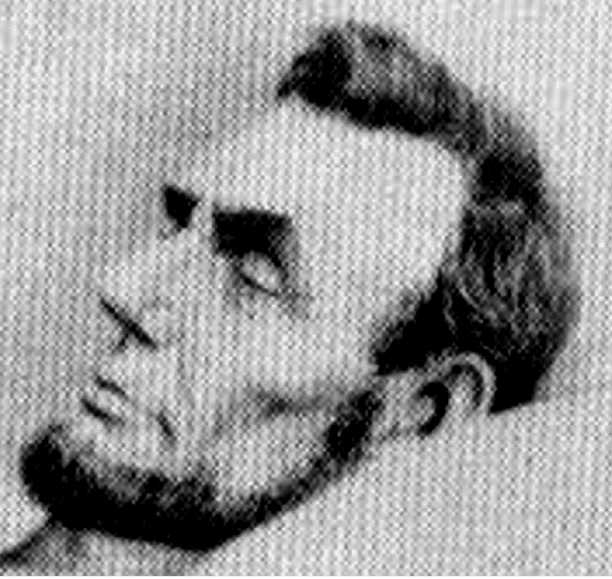
Abraham Lincoln, detail from a carte de visite (photo caption from book, retouched post mortem photograph by John B. Bachelder, Washington, DC, 16 April 1865)

- Famous Russian surgeon and scientist N. I. Pirogov was embalmed after his death in 1881. He was embalmed using the technique he himself developed. His body rests in a church in Vinnitsa, Ukraine. In contrast to the corpse of Lenin, which undergoes thorough maintenance in a special underground clinic twice a week, the body of Pirogov rests untouched and unchanging – reportedly only dust has to be brushed off of it. It rests at room temperature in a glass-lid coffin (while Lenin's body is preserved at a constant low temperature).
- Abraham Lincoln was embalmed after his assassination in 1865. To prevent anyone stealing Lincoln's body, Lincoln's eldest son Robert called for Lincoln's exhumation in 1901 to be buried in a concrete vault in the burial room of his tomb in Springfield, Illinois. Fearing that his body would have been stolen in the interim, Lincoln's coffin was opened, and his features were still recognizable, 36 years after his death.
- Rosalia Lombardo, who died at age one on 6 December 1920, was one of the last corpses to be interred in the Capuchin catacombs of Palermo, Sicily before the local authorities banned the practice. Nicknamed the 'Sleeping Beauty', Rosalia's body is still perfectly intact. Embalmed by Alfredo Salafia, she is in a glass case, looking very much like a surreal doll.
- Eva Perón was embalmed by Dr. Pedro Ara, as ordered by her husband Juan Perón. The body was preserved to look like it was in a sleep-like state. The procedure worked and the body showed no signs of decomposition when Eva was interred at her final resting place many years after the initial procedure.
- Kemal Atatürk was embalmed. His remains were originally laid to rest in the Ethnography Museum of Ankara from 10 November 1938 to 10 November 1953. He was subsequently moved to Anıtkabir in Ankara, Turkey, buried in a 42-ton sarcophagus.
- Chiang Kai-shek and Chiang Ching-kuo were embalmed and rest at Cihu Mausoleum and Touliao Mausoleum in Daxi District, Taoyuan City, Taiwan.
- Francisco Franco was embalmed. His remains were originally laid to rest in the Valley of the Fallen from 1975 to 2019. He was subsequently moved to Mingorrubio Cemetery, El Pardo, Madrid, Spain.
- Ferdinand Marcos was embalmed in Hawaii upon his death. His body was flown home and was on display at the Marcos Museum and Mausoleum in Batac, Ilocos Norte, Philippines from 1993 to 18 November 2016.
- Diana, Princess of Wales was embalmed shortly after her death in France in August 1997. The decision to embalm her provoked conspiracy theories that she was pregnant; conspiracists claimed, incorrectly, that the embalming fluid would have destroyed any evidence of fetal presence in her womb. The official explanation for the embalming was that the warm conditions in the chapel of rest where her body was laid out would have sped up the decomposition of the remains.
- When the Basilica of Saint-Denis was desecrated by French revolutionaries in 1793, the body of Henry IV was so well preserved it was displayed two days before being thrown in a mass grave, and a new death mask was able to be made. Likewise, Louis XIII was still recognisable thanks to his well preserved moustache. Turenne was so well preserved that looters first thought he was still alive.
- Maria II of Portugal died in childbirth on 15 November 1853, at the age of 34. Her embalming was conducted the following day and proved to be a complex procedure due to the rapid post-mortem changes in her remains. The Duchess of Ficalho, the queen's lady-in-waiting, provided a primary account of the event in a letter to her brother, the 2nd Count of Lavradio:

The sad embalming took place on November 16th, and I was present throughout. The procedure for the Infante and the Queen lasted seven hours. Once that ordeal was over, it was time to dress the body, which was nearly impossible due to the state of dissolution of Her Majesty. Nevertheless, it was done as well as possible, including the placement of the Orders and the Royal Mantle. It was ultimately necessary to close the coffin, for the state of dissolution was beyond description.

- In 2012, an exhumation of the remains of Amélie of Leuchtenberg (1812–1873), Empress of Brazil, revealed that her body had undergone extensive long-term preservation. Despite being interred for 139 years, the body was found mummified with skin, hair, and internal organs intact. Forensic analysis at the Hospital das Clínicas in São Paulo identified an incision in the jugular vein used to inject a solution of aromatic substances, such as camphor and myrrh, during the 19th century embalming. The preservation was attributed to this chemical process combined with the hermetic seal of her lead-lined casket, which prevented the growth of microorganisms. Before reinterment, researchers re-embalmed the remains using techniques analogous to the original vascular method.

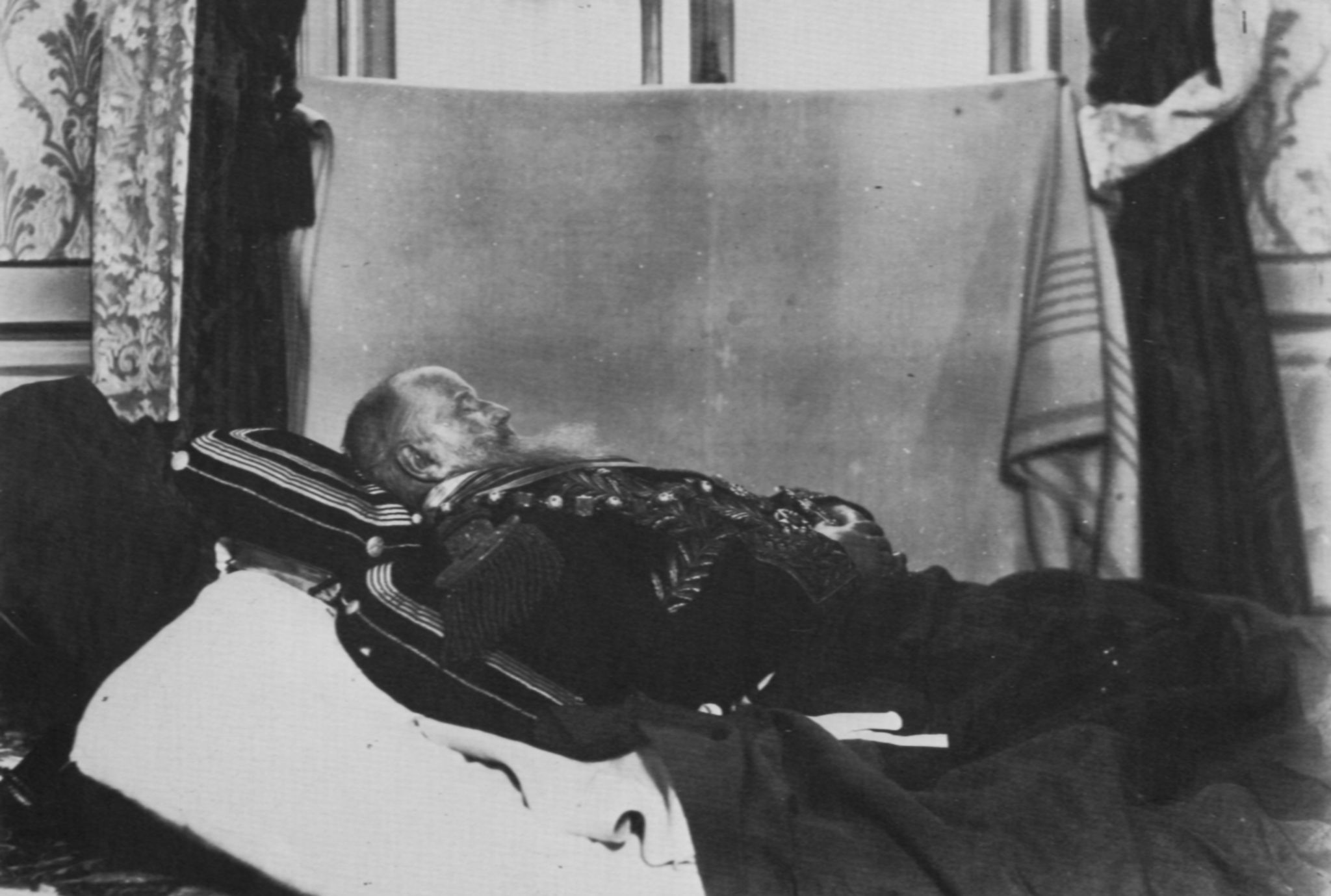
The embalmed body of Emperor Pedro II of Brazil lying on a bier before his state funeral in Paris, photographed by Nadar in 1891

- Pedro II of Brazil died of pneumonia at the age of 66 during his exile in France in 1891. He was embalmed on 5 December, the day of his death. During the procedure, six liters (1.585 U.S. gallons) of zinc and aluminum hydrochloride were injected into his common carotid artery. Three coffins were used: an inner coffin of lead lined with white satin; a middle coffin of varnished oak; and an outer coffin of oak covered by black velvet. According to Julie Anne Taddeo, a research professor of history at the University of Maryland, lead helps keep out moisture and preserve the body for longer and prevent smells and toxins from a dead body escaping. Interred in the Royal Pantheon of the House of Braganza in Lisbon on 12 December 1891, Pedro II became a focus of pilgrimage for Brazilians visiting Portugal, with the site attracting numerous visitors. Many would visit late at night, carrying candles provided by a local guard. As they leaned over the crystal-paned inner lead coffin to view the embalmed monarch, candle wax often dripped onto the Brazilian imperial flag draped over it. In the 1910s, Brazilian educator and archivist Luís Gastão d'Escragnolle Dória traveled to Europe on a scholarship to search for historical documents related to Brazil. In a 1912 visit to the Royal Pantheon, he noted that Pedro II's body remained largely well preserved and appeared much as it had been when first placed in the coffin. The emperor was dressed in his interment attire: the court dress uniform of a Marshal of the Imperial Brazilian Army, with the star of the Imperial Order of the Cross on his chest. He also wore the Order of the Golden Fleece and the collar of the Imperial Order of the Rose, while his hands clutched a silver crucifix sent by Pope Leo XIII. Despite recognizing the body's overall preservation, however, d'Escragnolle Dória felt that the embalming had not fully succeeded in maintaining the emperor's appearance. He wrote:

His face resembles old wax. His beard, once so fine, silky, and white, has turned a dull yellow, like aged ivory. When I saw him in February 1912, I found him smaller than he had been in late 1909. The head of Dom Pedro II rests on a pillow filled with Brazilian soil. The emperor looks so different! How cruel is an imperfect embalming! Where is that majestic head, once crowned with silvery hair? Where are his steel-blue eyes, his beautiful beard—gilded by youth and silvered by age—and his stately bearing?

Everything is gone, faded!

Involuntarily, I compare the mummified sovereign—now small and weathered—to the giant man I saw in 1886 entering the See of São Paulo. Amidst a colossal wave of people, he dominated the crowd, appearing many cubits taller.

The body of Pedro II and that of his wife Teresa Cristina (who was also embalmed) were officially repatriated to Brazil aboard a Brazilian Navy ship in 1921. (Note: cf. Legacy of Pedro II of Brazil.) The emperor and empress are now interred in the Imperial Mausoleum within the Cathedral of Saint Peter of Alcantara in Petrópolis, a city founded by Pedro II himself.

== See also ==
- Cryonics
- Freeze drying
- Funeral cosmetology
- Mortuary science
- Plastination
- Premature burial
