= Viewing (funeral) =

Funeral custom

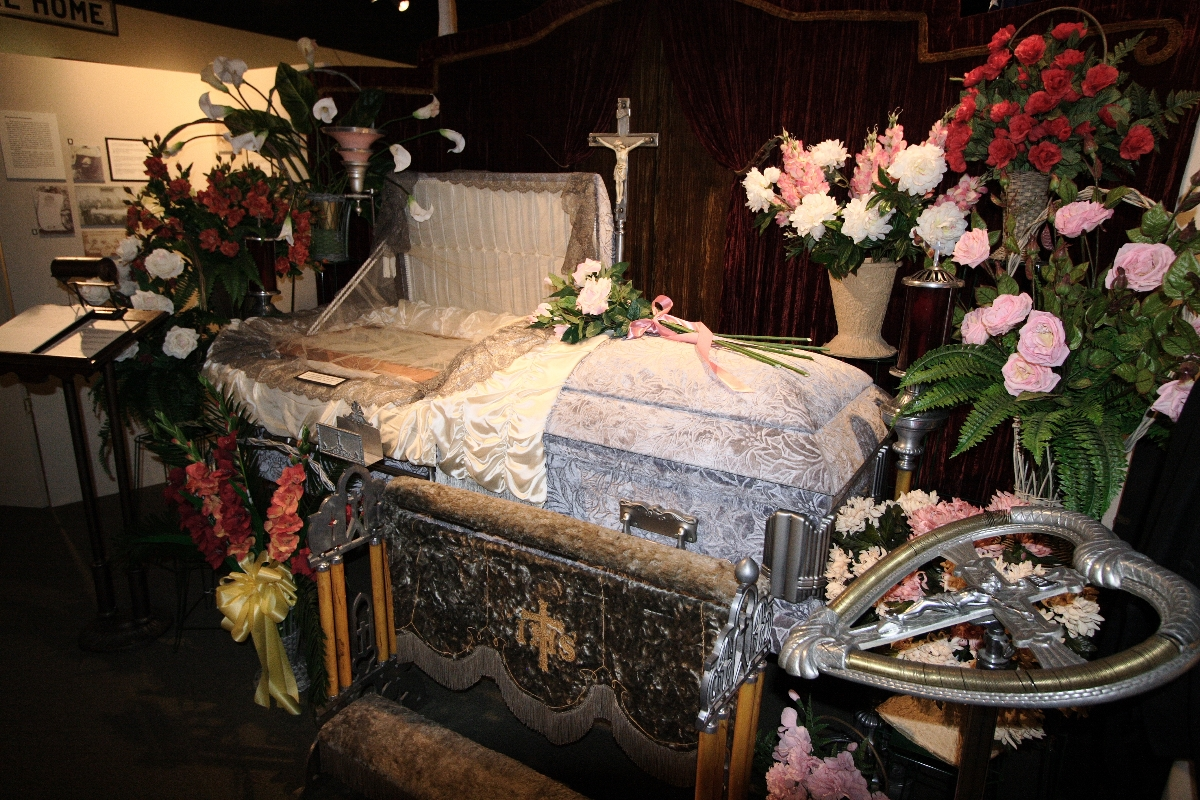
Viewing (museum display) Museum of Funeral Customs

In death customs, a viewing (sometimes referred to as reviewal, calling hours, funeral visitation in the United States and Canada) is the time that family and friends come to see the deceased before the funeral, once the body has been prepared by a funeral home. It is generally recommended (although not necessary) that a body first be embalmed to create the best possible presentation of the deceased. A viewing may take place at the funeral home's chapel, in a family home or at a place of worship, such as a church. Some cultures, such as the Māori of New Zealand, often take the body to the marae or tribal community hall.

Viewing is similar to a wake, which is a continuous watch kept over the dead by family and friends, usually in their own home. Many authorities consider the viewing or wake important to the grieving process as it gives a chance to say goodbye on a personal level. It can also make it easier to accept the reality of the death, which can often seem unreal especially in the industrial world where death is handled by professionals and the family may only know of a death through phone calls rather than experiencing it as it occurs.

Viewings differ by culture and religion. Approaches to viewings also depend on religious traditions and personal preference.

== History ==
Ritualised behaviour in history has been seen as promoting and maintaining the emotional wellbeing of the individual, as well as the social cohesion of the wider group (Wass & Niemeyer, 2012). The process of viewing the body of the deceased is a ritual that is presumed to predate human history. Viewing the body is believed to be a fundamental part of coming to terms with the death of another human, across cultures throughout time. The primitive nature of viewing the body serves the most basic need to understand and adapt to the reality of death.

In many parts of the world, viewings are seen to be declining in popularity, as death and dying become increasingly institutionalised. However, closed caskets, or no casket, is becoming a more standard practice today.

=== United Kingdom ===
Early in the 20th century it was common to view the body after death, but today in the United Kingdom it is usual to have a closed casket for the funeral, and people may not see the body beforehand.

=== United States ===
It has become a common practice among most religious faiths in America, with the notable exceptions of Judaism and Islam, to display the body of the deceased as part of the funeral ritual or service. It was argued by authors Maurice Lamm and Naftali Eskreis (1966) that viewings are a custom of recent American origin and have no roots in ancient culture or contemporary European culture except for the "lying in state" of kings and emperors.

=== Ireland ===
In Ireland the treatment of the dead has long been one of great respect. The term "viewing" is not used in Ireland. Rather, the event is referred to as a "reposal" (the body would be said to "be reposing"). Catholic tradition has meant that virtually all deceased persons are afforded a state of repose, regardless of whether the funeral is conducted as a Catholic or secular service. The reposal of the body can occur either within a funeral home or at the deceased's residence (or the residence of close family). If conducted in a funeral home, this usually occurs for a few hours on the evening before the funeral service and burial/cremation. If conducted in a house, this can be extended from several hours to even days, depending on the tradition of the individual locality. Reposals are usually open to the general public and no invite is required. Reposals in Ireland are usually conducted with the corpse displayed in an open coffin, so that the body itself is on display. Exceptions to this can occur, such as in the case of the death of a child or young person, or if the body sustained significant physical damage upon death (in the case of a fatal accident, for example). It is typical, particularly in rural areas, for neighbours, extended family and friends to attend the reposal as an opportunity to pay their respects to the deceased, as well as to sympathise with the deceased's immediate family (sometimes referred to as "mourners"). In the funeral home setting, the mourners are generally standing or sitting around the open casket or coffin to shake hands and accept offers of sympathy from the public.

== Reasons for viewings ==
=== Psychological ===
Mark Harris, in his book Grave Matters, describes some as finding viewings comforting, especially if the death was sudden, as it brings them to terms with their loss, while others find it uncomfortable and choose not to have a viewing. In an article published in 1966, Viewing the remains: A new American custom, authors Maurice Lamm and Naftali Eskreis argue that viewing the corpse can be seen as paying one's last respects to the deceased and a necessary aspect of "grief therapy", which allows mourners to see the deceased as they would like to remember them.

According to Dr Therese A. Rando, in the book Complicated Grieving and Bereavement: Understanding and Treating People Experiencing Loss, complications arise when a person chooses not to or is unable to view the body. Seeing the body assimilates the reality and allows the shock and denial to ease and allow for grieving to begin. This view, however, has been challenged by Maurice Lamm and Naftali Eskreis, who suggest it may prolong the natural grieving process rather than provide comfort.

A 2012 study, Family Members' Experiences with Viewing in the Wake of Sudden Death, conducted by Christina Harrington and Bethany Sprowl, looked at the consequences that viewing the body after a traumatic death has on bereaved relatives and whether it should be encouraged. The study revealed that viewing the body ultimately cemented the reality of death, and although it was found to be shocking or distressing to family members, only few in the study said they regretted it. A 2010 study conducted by BMJ, however, revealed that, following a traumatic death causing disfigurement, professionals may be reluctant to allow viewing because as they fear that relatives will leave with unpleasant, uninvited memories.

=== Religious ===
In Complicated Grieving and Bereavement, Dr Rando writes that viewings can be seen as allowing for those mourning to move from a physically present relationship to a spiritual relationship based on memory. Furthermore, physically seeing the body marks the end of the physical in order to begin a new spiritual relationship.

However, in the 1966 article Viewing the remains: A new American custom, Lamm and Eskreis say that some religions see the process of viewing the body as disregarding the rights of the deceased and detracting from the religious significance placed on life and death.

=== Legal ===
In cases where there is an ongoing investigation into the circumstances of someone's death, the police or coroner may have an officer observe the funeral and related gatherings.

== Types ==
In an open-casket funeral, a viewing is when the corpse is on display and viewed by family and friends, or in some cases the public, in order to commemorate the deceased guest of honor. There is no universal set of customs and practices for viewings – these vary based on factors such as religion and culture.

A visitation, also known as visiting hours, is when friends and family congregate to remember and celebrate the deceased individual. During a closed-casket funeral, the corpse is not on display. A photo album and video clips are shown as part of a slideshow instead especially in either a place of worship or funeral home. The service itself can be held in an urban cemetery's chapel mausoleum prior to the burial or a crematorium (crematory in the United States) prior to cremation. In the case of rural cemeteries, this ceremony would be in the form of a graveside service. In most cases of closed-casket funeral services, the body would be wearing socks, undergarments and pajamas or hospital gowns (burial gowns for recently deceased women) if it has not been embalmed.

== Preparation ==
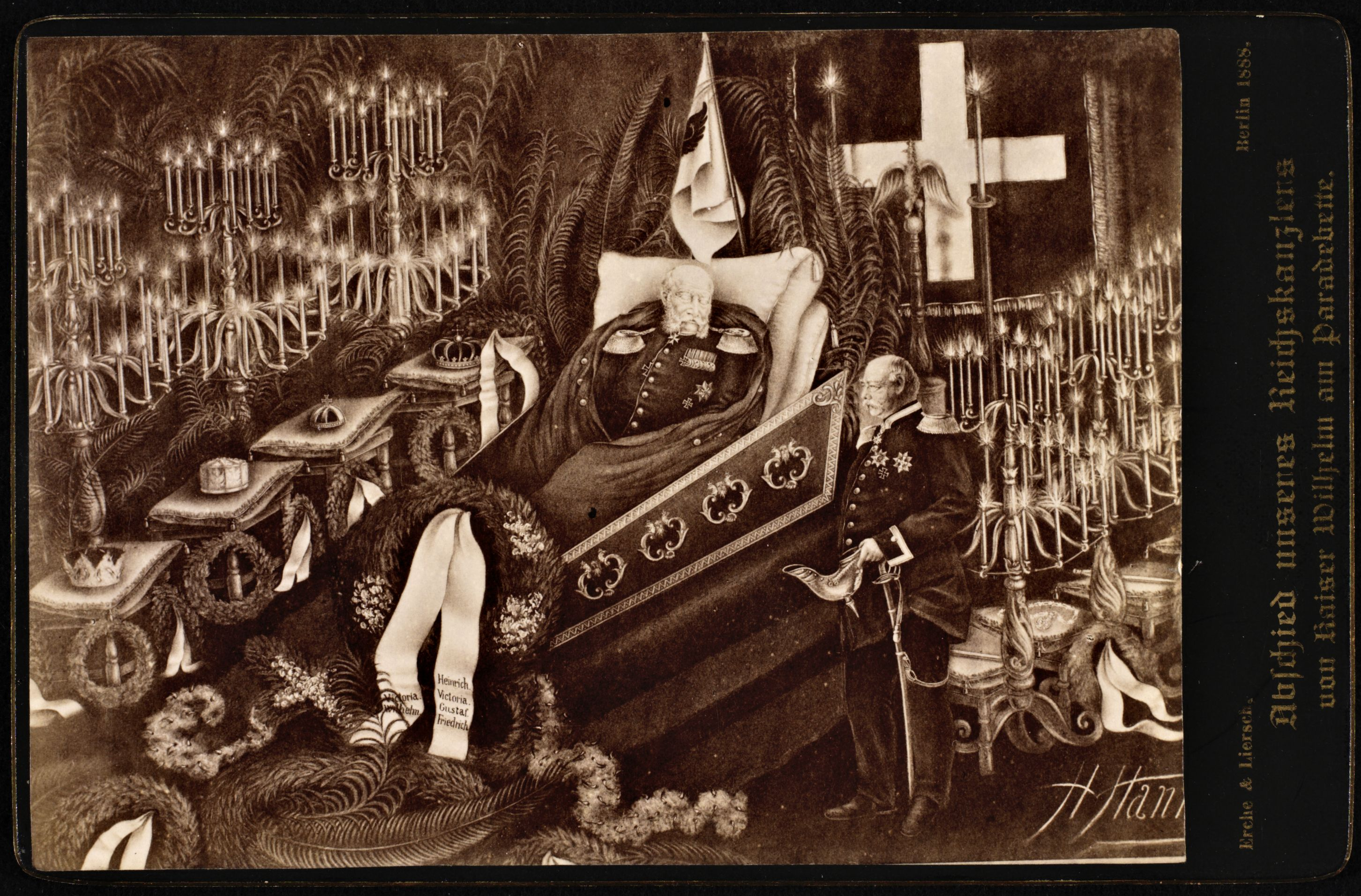
A slumber room in a funeral home featuring a bed may be used as an alternative to a casket.

The body is transported from the place of death, often a hospital or place of residence, to a funeral establishment. There, the body is usually embalmed to greatly reduce the rate of decay. This may be required if the body will be transported a longer distance, or if burial will be delayed so mourners (especially those traveling a long way) have more time to come pay their respects. Embalming is generally a legal requirement when human remains will be transported long distances. This can happen when someone dies far from their home, but is to be buried near where they lived, or when someone is buried in their original hometown after having lived and died somewhere else.

The body is dressed neatly and placed in a casket, then cosmetics are usually applied to ensure the body is presented in a pleasant way. The casket lid is left open for a viewing or closed for a visitation.

== Cultural and religious beliefs ==
=== Aboriginal Australian ===
Christianity is the dominant religion in many Aboriginal communities; however, aspects of traditional Aboriginal beliefs are often maintained as well. Traditional medicines such as sage and sweet grass are burned to purify the dead and all those present. Visitations help family, friends and clan members let go of the spirit of the deceased and help the grieving family move from feelings of anger and disbelief to acceptance and peace.

=== Buddhism ===
Viewings are acceptable in Buddhism, and involve the deceased being washed, dressed in "everyday clothes" and placed in a simple casket. Washing the deceased signifies a new and somewhat backwards beginning. From the moment one has passed on everything that would have been done in their day-to-day life is now reversed, such as putting on an item of clothing backwards. In the Buddhist religion, to ensure that the deceased is able to cross the river from the world of the living, a coin or sometimes a betel leaf is placed in their mouth. The viewing can last as long as the family desires. Since the 1940s, it has become more common for the coffin to be covered by a wooden lid.

=== Christianity ===
Most denominations in Christianity allow the body to be embalmed and viewed by loved ones. It is generally a matter of the family's personal preference, not church teachings.

=== Hinduism ===
In Hinduism, viewings are allowed, and usually take place before the cremation. Cremation usually takes place near a river bank at The Burning Ghats directly after dipping the body into the river. The body is to be displayed in a simple casket.

=== Islam ===
According to Islamic law, the body should be buried as soon after death as possible. As viewings delay burial, they are not practiced.

=== Judaism ===
Viewings are not part of traditional Jewish practice. Pre-burial gatherings of this kind do not fit well with the teaching that one cannot and should not comfort the mourners while the dead lie before them, but rather, the right time for comfort is after the funeral and burial.

Jews also believe that the soul leaves the body immediately after death to go back to heaven. Additionally, they do not practice embalming. For these reasons, the funeral and burial take place very soon after death and unnecessary delays are avoided.

During cleansing of the deceased, a prayer is read to ask for forgiveness of the dead and to present them to God.

=== Maori ===
In traditional Maori culture, most bodies are embalmed before being taken to the local marae where family and friends gather to pay their respects. A visitation takes place at the marae where family and friends sing songs, share food and speeches are given to remember the deceased.

== See also ==
- Wake
- Lying in state and lying in repose
