= National Accrediting Commission of Cosmetology Arts and Sciences =

The National Accrediting Commission of Career Arts and Sciences (NACCAS) is an accrediting commission that accredits cosmetology schools and beauty schools in the United States. It is considered an autonomous, independent accrediting agency, as well as a nonprofit Delaware corporation. The main office of NACCAS is located in Alexandria, Virginia. NACCAS is recognized by the U.S. Department of Education as a national agency for the institutional accreditation of post-secondary schools and departments of cosmetology arts and sciences, including specialized schools.

== National Accrediting Commission of Career Arts and Sciences (NACCAS) History ==
NACCAS began in 1969, but it changed its name and became NACCAS in 1981, after two accrediting commissions, the Accrediting Commission for Cosmetology Education and the National Accrediting Commission for Cosmetology schools merged to form the Cosmetology Accrediting Commission (CAC). Currently the agency accredits approximately 1,300 cosmetology school and beauty school institutions, affecting more than 120,000 students nationwide. The NACCAS scope of accreditation includes more than thirty (30) courses and programs of study that fall under NACCAS’ scope of accreditation.

== Cosmetology School Accreditation Criteria ==
Beauty schools and cosmetology schools that are labeled "NACCAS accredited" must meet certain academic and institutional requirements established by the National Accrediting Commission of Career Arts and Sciences (NACCAS). Some factors for accreditation include: cosmetology school curriculum, quality of education provided to students, facilities, staff and admission policies.
