= Museum of Funeral Customs =

Museum in Springfield, Illinois, U.S.

Coordinates: 39°49′12″N 89°39′12″W

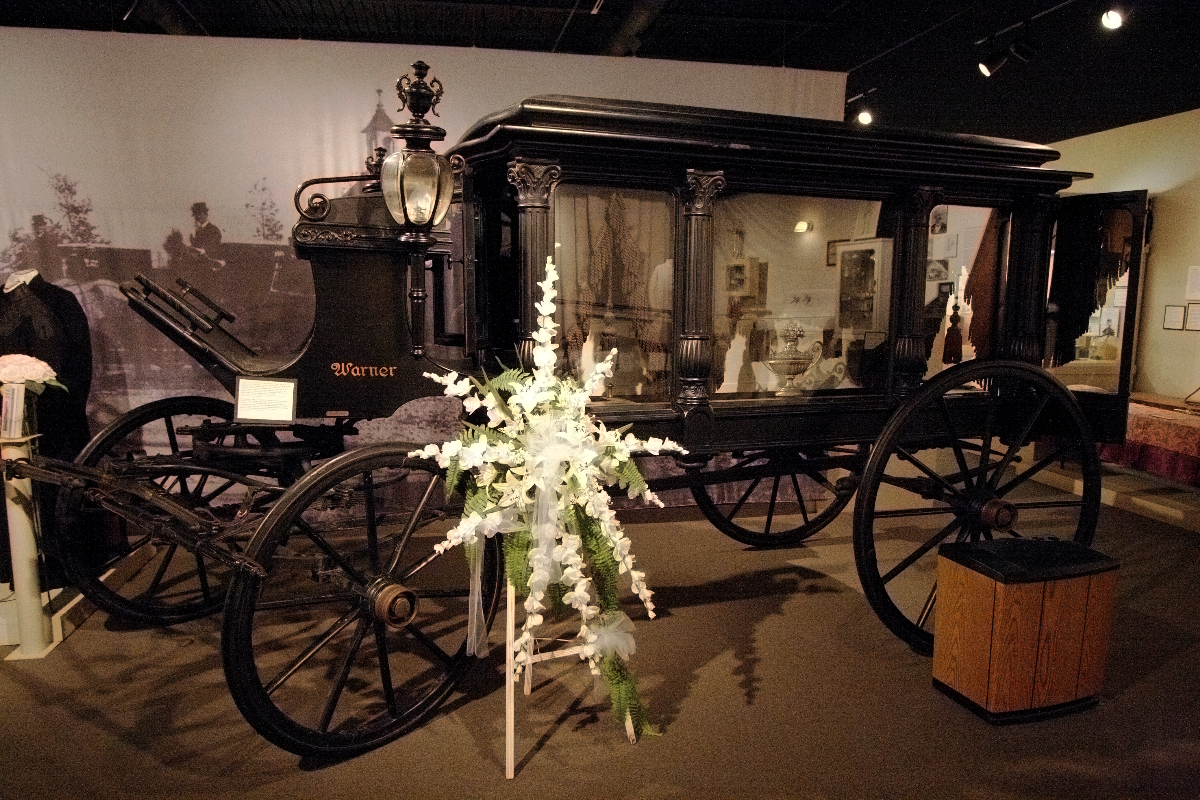
Funeral Carriage

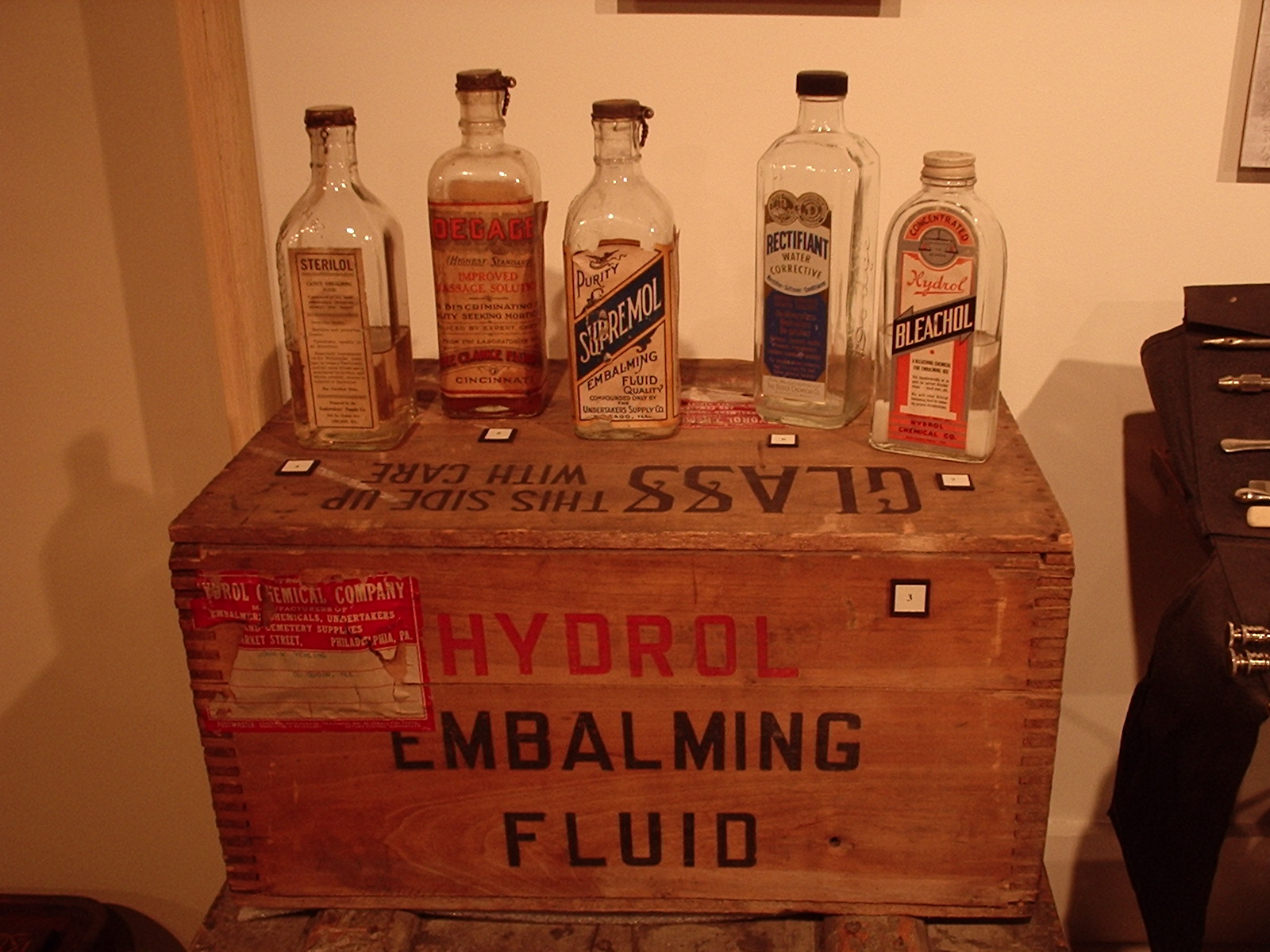
Early embalming fluid

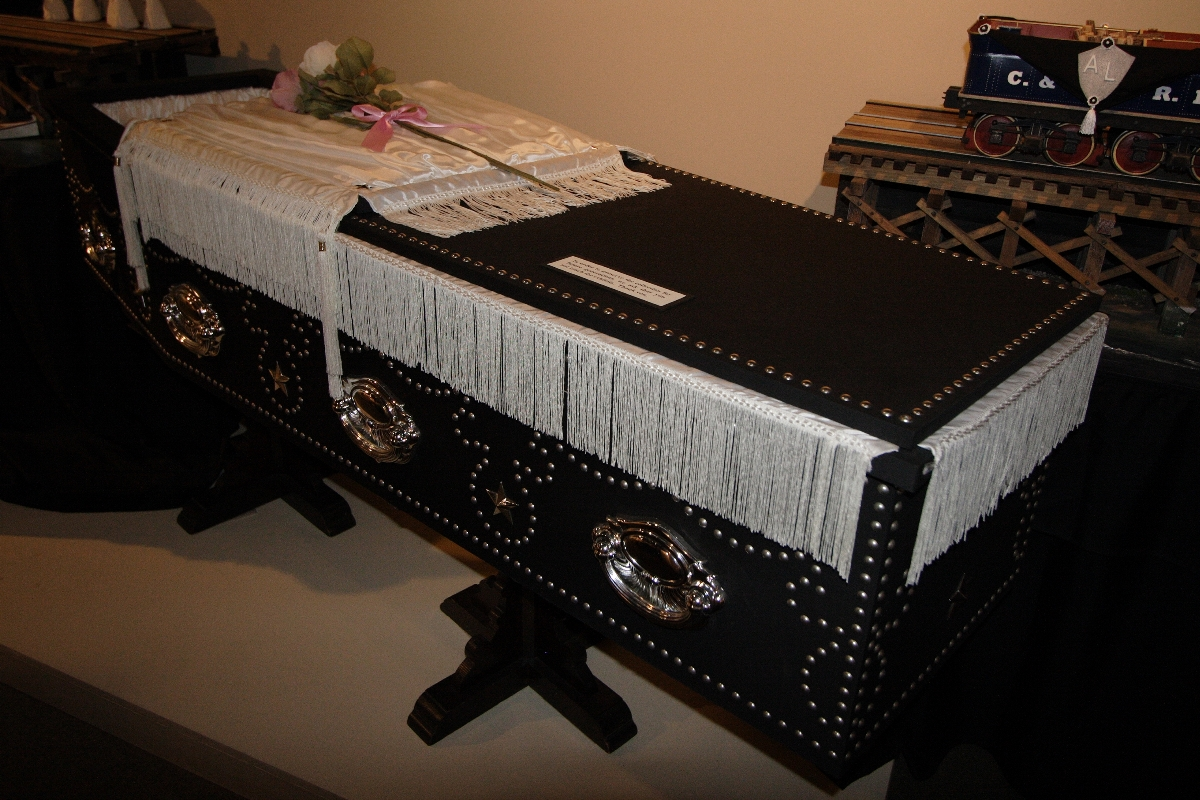
Lincoln's coffin, replica

The Museum of Funeral Customs was a museum located in Springfield, Illinois, featuring exhibits on American funerary and mourning customs. The museum was near Oak Ridge Cemetery, the site of Abraham Lincoln's tomb. Collections at the museum included a re-created 1920s embalming room, coffins and funeral paraphernalia from various cultures and times, examples of post-mortem photography, and a scale model of Lincoln's funeral train.

The museum hosted tours and special events, and provided resources to scholars who were researching funeral customs. A gift shop provided books and funeral-related gifts, including coffin-shaped keychains and chocolates. It was closed in March 2009 due to poor attendance and handling of the museum's trust fund. The contents of the collection were transferred to the Kibbe Hancock Heritage Museum in Carthage, Illinois, in February 2011.

The museum building reopened in March 2016 as the Springfield and Central Illinois African-American History Museum, which focuses on the history of the Black community of central Illinois.
