= Anti-African sentiment =

Fear or hatred of African people

Anti-African sentiment, Afroscepticism, or Afrophobia is prejudice, discrimination, or racism towards people and cultures of Africa and of the African diaspora.

Prejudice against Africans and people of African descent has a long history, dating back to ancient history, although it was especially prominent during the Atlantic slave trade, the trans-Saharan slave trade, the Indian Ocean slave trade, the Red Sea slave trade, and the colonial period. Under the pretence of white supremacism, Africans were often portrayed by Europeans as uncivilised and primitive, with colonial conquest branded civilising missions. Due to the use of oral tradition, and subsequent lack of written histories in most African cultures, African people were portrayed as having no history at all, despite having a long, complex, and varied history. The phenomenon of scientific racism spread in the 19th century as a pseudoscientific method of justifying white supremacist beliefs and the discrimination of African peoples. In the United States, Afrophobia influenced Jim Crow laws and segregated housing, schools, and public facilities. In South Africa, it took the form of apartheid.

In recent years, there has been a rise in Afrophobic hate speech and violence in Europe and the United States. This has been attributed to a number of factors, including the growth of the African diaspora in these regions, the increase in refugees and migrants from Africa, and the rise of far-right and populist political parties.

In October 2017, the United Nations' Working Group of Experts on People of African Descent (WGEPAD) told the Human Rights Council that the human rights situation of Africans and people of African descent remained an urgent concern, citing racist violence, police brutality and killings, and systemic racism. Earlier that year, WGEPAD had recommended the term Afrophobia be used to describe "the unique and specific form of racial discrimination affecting people of African descent and African Diaspora".

== Terminology ==
Anti-African sentiment is prejudice or discrimination towards any of the various traditions and peoples of Africa for their perceived Africanness. It is distinct from, but may overlap with, Anti-Black racism or Negrophobia, which is contempt specifically for Black people of African descent, excluding other Africans such as white Africans or North Africans. The term Afrophobia may be used to describe both anti-Black racism and anti-African sentiment more broadly.

=== Afrophobia ===
Afrophobia, or Afriphobia, is frequently used to describe racism (particularly systemic racism) against Black people of African descent, such as by the European Network Against Racism (ENAR). Others use Afrophobia to describe racism and xenophobia against people of African descent, especially racism and xenophobia against indigenous Africans, due to their perceived Africanness. This sentiment may also include prejudice against African traditions and culture. In South Africa, for example, Afrophobia is used to describe xenophobia against people of other African nationalities for being too racially Black, too culturally African, or both.

The opposite of Afrophobia is Afrophilia, which is a love for all things pertaining to Africa.

=== Afroscepticism ===
Anti-African sentiment and Afroscepticism are comparable terms to anti-Europeanism and Euroscepticism. Afroscepticism is positioned as an opposition to Africanity (the idea of a shared African culture), Africanization, or Afrocentrism, often seen as facets of Pan-Africanism. Afroscepticism may include embracing Afropessimism, and rejecting traditional African practices or "African Indigenous Knowledge Systems". The Afropessimist view sees Africa in terms of "the negative traits described by AIDS, war, poverty and disease", and thus as unable to be helped.

=== Anti-Black racism ===
Anti-Black racism was a term used by Canadian scholar Akua Benjamin in a 1992 report on Ontario race relations. It has been defined as follows:

Anti-Black racism is a specific manifestation of racism rooted in European colonialism, slavery and oppression of Black people since the sixteenth century. It is a structure of iniquities in power, resources and opportunities that systematically disadvantages people of African descent.

The term quickly came to be used to refer to racism against other groups also considered Black, such as Indigenous Australians (who sometimes prefer the term Blak) and Melanesians.

The term racism is not attested before the 20th century, but negrophobia (first recorded between 1810–1820; often capitalised), and later colourphobia (first recorded in 1834), likely originated within the abolitionist movement, where it was used as an analogy to rabies (then called hydrophobia) to describe the "mad dog" mindset behind the pro-slavery cause and its apparently contagious nature. J. L. A. Garcia refers to negrophobia as "the granddaddy" of terms such as xenophobia, Islamophobia and homophobia. Melanophobia has been used to refer to both anti-Black racism and colourism (prejudice against people with darker skin), especially in Latin America, the Middle East, and Africa.

== By location ==
It has been observed that writing and terminology about racism, including about Afrophobia, has been somewhat centered on the US. In 2016, "Afrophobia" has been used as a term for racism against darker-skinned persons in China. In such usage, that is an inexact term because the racism is directed against darker-skinned persons from anywhere, without regard to any connection to Africa. Conversely, Chinese views for lighter-than-average skin are more positive, as is reflected in advertising.

== Scientific racism ==
Scientific racism represents a pseudoscientific justification for the discriminatory treatment of Africans that gained popularity in the 19th century, following the publication of Charles Darwin's On The Origin of Species (1859) and his concept of natural selection. Although his work focused primarily on the evolution of animal species, Social Darwinists such as Herbert Spencer later applied the principle of "survival of the fittest" to human society. The so-called "fittest" were considered innately more capable of survival amongst competition due to physical and intellectual superiority, providing an explanation for the comparative success of European empires against African societies at the time. The "father of the eugenics movement," Francis Galton, believed heavily in the biological importance of heredity and encouraged reproduction amongst the Anglo-Saxon population, and discouraged it amongst those he deemed "unfit" (often people of color) for the betterment of Western society.

The popularization of scientific racism was born from an emergence of ideas about the importance of heredity over environment in determining individual characteristics. This was combined with beliefs about the superiority of the White European (called "Aryanism" or "Teutonicism," and later "Nordicism") over other races, including the African, to produce scientific racist thought closely related to the emerging eugenics movement. Scientific racists utilized a pseudoscientific method of applying empiricism to "prove" innate biological differences between races. Measurements of cranium size were used in the 19th century to suggest that Africans and African-Americans were inherently inferior in terms of intelligence and capability.

Although scientifically racist ideas were common centuries earlier, Georges Vacher de Lapouge, a French writer, became the first to espouse a complete ideology of scientific racism with his works Social Selection (1896) and The Aryan and his Social Role (1899). Vacher de Lapouge divided the human population into distinct races based on head shape, with what he referred to as the "Dolichos" ("Aryans," or White Europeans) being the most superior and socially favorable. Africans and other races fell into the category of "Brachies," described by Vacher de Lapouge as being dark-skinned, timid, and without natural leadership abilities. These ideas of the existence of "superior" and "inferior" races and societies served to justify the colonialism and imperialism being done to Africans on the continent and racial discrimination within the diaspora, as well as contributed to the growth of the larger eugenics movement in 20th-century Germany and the United States.

Today, scientific racism is considered to be a pseudoscience as it does not align with the consensus of modern scientific thought. Its division of Africans and other peoples into separate groups with distinct mental and physical characteristics contradicts with 21st-century understandings of genetics, and represents a misapplication of anthropology and evolutionary biology.

== Colonial historiography ==
Most African societies used oral tradition to record their history, meaning there was little written history. Colonial histories focussed on the exploits of soldiers, colonial administrators, and "colonial figures", using limited sources and written from an entirely European perspective, ignoring the viewpoint of the colonised under the pretence of white supremacism. Africans were considered racially inferior, supporting their "civilising mission". Oral sources were deprecated and dismissed by most historians, giving them the impression Africa had no history and little desire to create it. Some colonisers took interest in the other viewpoint and attempted to produce a more detailed history of Africa using oral sources and archaeology, however they received little recognition at the time.

== Stereotypes of Africa ==
Stereotypes about Africa, Africans, and African cultures are common, especially in the Western world. European imperialism was often justified on paternalistic grounds, portraying Africa as less civilized, and Africans as less capable of civilizing themselves. (Note: Attributed to multiple sources:) As of the 2010s, these stereotypes persisted in European media.

== Activism ==
To overcome any perceived "Afrophobia", writer Langston Hughes suggested that European Americans must achieve peace of mind and accommodate the uninhibited emotionality of African Americans. Author James Baldwin similarly recommended that White Americans could quash any "Afrophobia" on their part by getting in touch with their repressed feelings, empathizing to overcome their "emotionally stunted" lives, and thereby overcome any dislike or fear of African Americans.

Originally established in 1998 by "approximately 150" organisations from across the European Union, the European Network Against Racism (ENAR) aimed to combat "racism, xenophobia and anti-Semitism — the accepted categories of the anti-racist struggle at that time". However, Afrophobia wasn't specifically named as a focus of the network until 2011, at the behest of Black civil rights activists.

In 2016, Tess Asplund made a viral protest against Neo-Nazism as part of her activism against Afrophobia.

== In academia ==
Some Afrophobic sentiments are based on the belief that Africans are unsophisticated. Such perceptions include the belief that Africans lack a history of civilization, and visual imagery of such stereotypes perpetuate the notion that Africans still live in mud huts and carry spears, along with other notions that indicate their primitiveness.

Afrophobia in academia may also occur through by oversight with regards to lacking deconstruction in mediums such as African art forms, omitting historical African polities in world cartography, or promoting a eurocentric viewpoint by ignoring historic African contributions to world civilization.

== See also ==
- African-American culture
- African-American history
- African diaspora
- Anti-Arab racism
- Anti-Black racism
- Aporophobia
- Black genocide in the United States – the notion that African Americans have been subjected to genocide because of racism against them
- Black people and Mormonism
- Black people and temple and priesthood policies in the Church of Jesus Christ of Latter-day Saints
- Curse and mark of Cain
- Curse of Ham
- Discrimination based on skin tone
- Darfur genocide
- Great Replacement
- Historical race concepts
- Masalit massacres (2023–present)
- One-drop rule
- Pre-Adamite
- Racial bias in criminal news
- Racial hierarchy
- Racial hygiene
- Racial segregation
- Racism against African Americans
- Racism in the United States
- Slavery in the United States
- Stereotypes of Africa
- Stereotypes of African Americans
- White backlash
- White genocide conspiracy theory
- White nationalism
- White pride
- White supremacy
- Arab nationalism
- Racism in the Arab world
