= Xenophobia =

Fear and dislike of that which is perceived to be foreign or strange

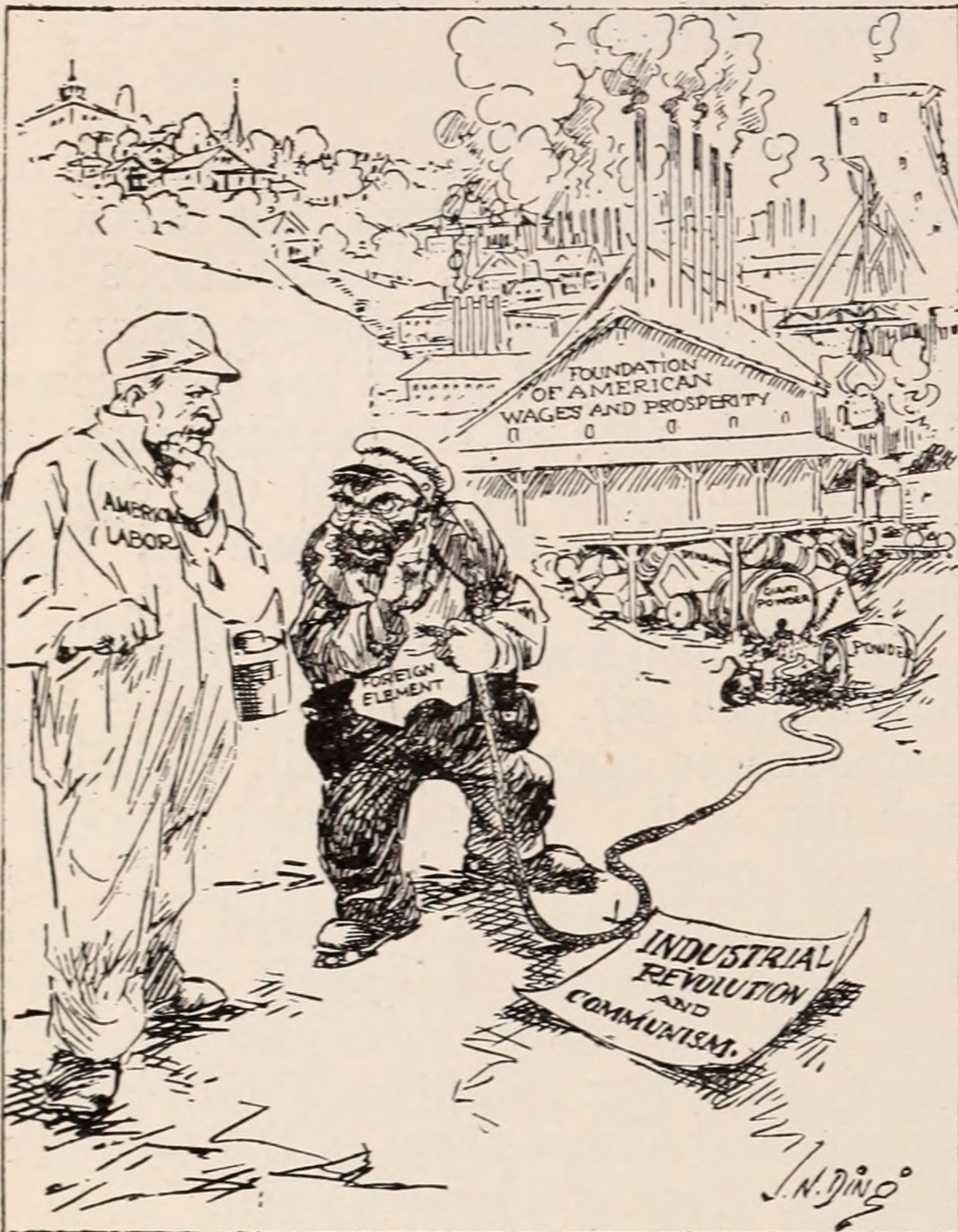
A 1912 xenophobic cartoon blaming foreigners for threatening economic prosperity in the United States

Xenophobia (from Ancient Greek ξένος (xénos) 'strange, foreign, or alien' and φόβος (phóbos) 'fear') is the fear or dislike of people who are perceived as being foreign or strange. It is an expression that is based on the perception that a conflict exists between an in-group and an out-group and it may manifest itself in suspicion of one group's activities by members of the other group, a desire to eliminate the presence of the group that is the target of suspicion, and fear of losing a national, ethnic, or racial identity.

== Alternative definitions ==
A 1997 review article on xenophobia holds that it is "an element of a political struggle about who has the right to be cared for by the state and society: a fight for the collective good of the modern state".

According to Italian sociologist Guido Bolaffi, xenophobia can also be exhibited as an "uncritical exaltation of another culture" which is ascribed "an unreal, stereotyped and exotic quality".

== History ==
=== Ancient Africa ===
In Ancient Egypt, foreigners were conceived of through a complex xenophobic discourse. Given ancient Egypt's long history, Egyptians encountered a number of different peoples. Peoples living in present-day Greece, Sudan, and Turkey, for instance, were referred to by various names in Egyptian. According to one source, "...all the names have at the end the same hieroglyphic sign– a determinative or taxogram– indicating the word group. This is the hieroglyph for a hilly country or the desert– indicating 'foreign land' (khaset)...By contrast, Egypt (Kemet/Black land) is written with the determinative for a town. This indicates that Egyptians regarded their part of the world as cultivated, ordered and civilized, while the other countries were not." This indicates an early example of a xenophobic attitude towards other peoples. In addition, ancient Egyptian hieroglyphics indicate xenophobic ideas about a necessity to conquer non-Egyptians, with Hittites in particular being referred to as "vile".

=== Ancient Europe ===
An early example of xenophobic sentiment in Western culture is the Ancient Greek denigration of foreigners as "barbarians", the belief that the Greek people and culture were superior to all other peoples and cultures, and the subsequent conclusion that barbarians were naturally meant to be enslaved.

Ancient Romans also held notions of superiority over other peoples. such as in a speech attributed to Manius Acilius:

There, as you know, there were Macedonians and Thracians and Illyrians, all most warlike nations, here Syrians and Asiatic Greeks, the most worthless peoples among mankind and born for slavery.

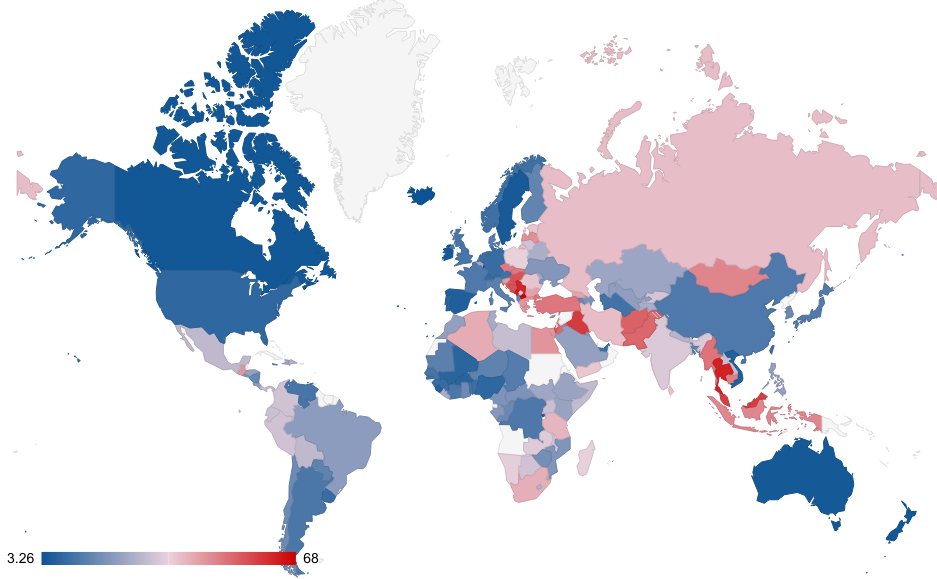
A global index of anti-immigrant xenophobia based on https://doi.org/10.1080/21565503.2022.2097097

Black Africans were considered especially exotic, and perhaps they were considered threateningly alien, so they are seldom if ever mentioned in Roman literature without some negative connotations. The historian Appian claims that the military commander Marcus Junius Brutus, before the battle of Philippi in 42BC, met an 'Ethiopian' outside the gates of his camp: his soldiers instantly hacked the man to pieces, taking his appearance for a bad omen—to the superstitious Roman, black was the colour of death."

=== COVID-19 ===
The COVID-19 pandemic, which was first reported in the city of Wuhan, Hubei, China, in December 2019, led to an increase in acts and displays of Sinophobia, as well as prejudice, xenophobia, discrimination, violence, and racism against people of East Asian and Southeast Asian descent and appearance around the world. With the spread of the pandemic and the formation of COVID-19 hotspots, such as those in Asia, Europe, and the Americas, discrimination against people from these hotspots was reported.

== Regional manifestations ==
=== Americas ===
==== Brazil ====
Despite the majority of the country's population being of mixed (Pardo), African, or indigenous heritage, depictions of non-European Brazilians on the programming of most national television networks is scarce and typically relegated for musicians/their shows. In the case of telenovelas, Brazilians of darker skin tone are typically depicted as housekeepers or in positions of lower socioeconomic standing.

==== Canada ====
Muslim and Sikh Canadians have faced racism and discrimination in recent years, especially since the 2001 terrorist attacks on the U.S. and the spillover effect of the United States' war on terror. An increase in hate crimes targeting Ontario Muslims was reported after ISIS took responsibility for the November 2015 Paris attacks.

A 2016 survey from The Environics Institute, which was a follow-up to a study conducted 10 years prior, found that there may be discriminating attitudes that may be a residual of the effects of the 11 September 2001 attacks in the United States. A poll in 2009 by Maclean's revealed that 28% of Canadians viewed Islam favourably, and 30% viewed the Sikh religion favourably. 45% of respondents believed Islam encourages violence. In Quebec in particular, only 17% of respondents had a favourable view of Islam.

==== Colombia ====
According to the UNHCR, by June 2019, 1.3 million of the 4 million Venezuelan refugees were in Colombia. Because of their urgent situation, many migrants from Venezuela crossed the border illegally, indicating they had few opportunities to gain "access to legal and other rights or basic services and are exposed to exploitation, abuse, manipulation and a wide range of other protection risks, including racism, discrimination and xenophobia". Since the start of the migrant crisis, media outlets and state officials have raised concerns about increasing discrimination against migrants in the country, especially xenophobia and violence against the migrants.

==== Mexico ====
Racism in Mexico has a long history. Historically, Mexicans with light skin tones had absolute control over dark skinned Amerindians due to the structure of the Spanish colonial caste system. When a Mexican of a darker-skinned tone marries one of a lighter skinned-tone, it is common for them say that they are 'making the race better' (mejorando la raza)". This can be interpreted as a self-attack on their ethnicity. Despite improving economic and social conditions of indigenous Mexicans, discrimination against them continues to this day and there are few laws to protect indigenous Mexicans from discrimination. Violent attacks against indigenous Mexicans are moderately common and many times go unpunished.

On 15 March 1911, a band of Maderista soldiers entered Torreón, Mexico, and massacred 303 Chinese and five Japanese. Historian Larissa Schwartz argues that Kang Youwei had successfully organized the prosperous Chinese businessmen there, making them a visible target for class antagonism made extreme by xenophobia.

The Chinese were easy to identify in northern cities and were frequent targets especially in Sonora in the 1930s. Systematic persecution resulted from economic, political, and psychological fears of the Chinese, and the government showed little interest in protecting them.

Theresa Alfaro-Velcamp argues that the Porfiriato, 1876–1910 promoted immigration from the Middle East. However the revolution of 1910–20 saw a surge in xenophobia and nationalism based on "mestizaje." The community divided into the economically prosperous Lebanese Mexicans who took pride in a distinct Lebanese-Mexican identity, while the downscale remainder often merged into the mestizo community.

Racism against indigenous people has been a current problem in Mexico. Domestic workers, many of whom are indigenous women who have moved from rural villages to cities, often face discrimination including verbal, physical or sexual abuse.

==== Panama ====
Peter Szok argues that when the United States brought in large numbers of laborers from the Caribbean—called "Afro-Panamanians"—to build the Panama Canal (1905–1914), xenophobia emerged. The local elite in Panama felt its culture was threatened: they cried out, "La Patria es el Recuerdo." ("The Homeland is the Memory") and developed a Hispanophile elitist identity through an artistic literary movement known as "Hispanismo." Another result was the election of the "overtly nationalist and anti-imperialist" Arnulfo Arias as president in 1940.

==== Peru ====
Racism against indigenous people is a current problem in Peru. Domestic workers, many of whom are indigenous women who have moved from rural villages to cities, often face discrimination including verbal, physical or sexual abuse.

Due to Tren de Aragua's heavy presence in Lima, there were increased sentiments of xenophobia against Venezuelans. Following clashes between Peruvians and Venezuelan migrants at the Gamarra Market in Lima, the "Los Gallegos" chapter of the Tren de Aragua released a video stating: "There will be no peace for Peruvians who support xenophobia. We will begin to kill all Peruvian mototaxi drivers."

==== Venezuela ====
In Venezuela, like other South American countries, economic inequality often breaks along ethnic and racial lines. A 2013 Swedish academic study stated that Venezuela was the most racist country in the Americas, followed by the Dominican Republic.

==== United States ====
In a 2010 report, a network of more than 300 US-based civil rights and human rights organizations stated that "Discrimination permeates all aspects of life in the United States, and it extends to all communities of color." Discrimination against racial, ethnic, and religious minorities is widely acknowledged, especially in the case of African Americans, diaspora Africans, and other ethnic minorities, in the United States.

Members of every major American ethnic and religious minority group have perceived discrimination in their dealings with members of other minority racial and religious groups. Philosopher Cornel West has argued that "racism is an integral element within the very fabric of American culture and society. It is embedded in the country's first collective definition, enunciated in its subsequent laws, and imbued in its dominant way of life."

A 2019 survey by the Pew Research Center suggested that 76% of black and Asian respondents had experienced some form of discrimination, at least from time to time. Studies which have been conducted by the PNAS and Nature have found that during traffic stops, officers spoke to black men in a less respectful tone than they spoke to white men and those same studies have also found that black drivers are more likely to be pulled over and searched by police than white drivers. Black people are also reportedly overrepresented as criminals in the media. In 2020 the COVID-19 epidemic was often blamed on China, leading to attacks on Chinese Americans. This represents a continuation of xenophobic attacks on Chinese Americans for 150 years.

=== Asia ===
==== Bhutan ====
In 1991–92, Bhutan is said to have deported between 10,000 and 100,000 ethnic Nepalis (Lhotshampa). The actual number of refugees who were initially deported is debated by both sides. In March 2008, this population began a multiyear resettlement in third countries including the U.S., Canada, New Zealand, Norway, Denmark, the Netherlands and Australia.

==== China ====
===== The Boxers =====
The Boxer Rebellion was a violent anti-foreign, anti-Christian, and anti-imperialist uprising which occurred in China between 1899 and 1901. It was led by a new group, the ‘Militia United in Righteousness', the group was popularly known as the Boxers because many of its members had practiced Chinese martial arts, at the time, these martial arts were popularly referred to as Chinese Boxing. After China's defeat in war by Japan in 1895, villagers in North China feared the expansion of foreign spheres of influence and resented the extension of privileges to Christian missionaries. In a severe drought, Boxer violence spread across Shandong and the North China Plain, destroying foreign property, attacking or murdering Christian missionaries and Chinese Christians. In June 1900, Boxer fighters, convinced that they were invulnerable to foreign weapons, converged on Beijing, and their slogan was "Support the Qing government and exterminate the foreigners." Diplomats, missionaries, soldiers and some Chinese Christians took refuge in the diplomatic Legation Quarter. They were besieged for 55 days by the Imperial Army of the Chinese government and the Boxers. George Makari says that the Boxers, "promoted a violent hatred of all those from other lands and made no effort to distinguish the beneficent from the rapacious ones.... They were unabashedly xenophobic." The Boxers were overthrown by an Eight Nation Alliance of American, Austro-Hungarian, British, French, German, Italian, Japanese, and Russian troops—20,000 in all—that invaded China to lift the siege in August 1900. The allies imposed the Boxer Protocol in 1901, with a massive annual cash indemnity to be paid by the Chinese government. The episode generated worldwide attention and denunciation of xenophobia.

===== Chinese nationalism and xenophobia =====
Historian Mary C. Wright has argued that the combination of Chinese nationalism and xenophobia had a major impact on the Chinese worldview in the first half of the 20th century. Examining the bitterness and hatred which existed towards Americans and Europeans in the decades before the Communist takeover in 1949, she argues:

The crude fear of the white peril that the last imperial dynasty had been able to exploit in the Boxer Rebellion of 1900 had been submerged but not overcome, and expanding special privileges of foreigners were irritants in increasingly wide spheres of Chinese life. These fears and irritations provided a mass sounding board for what otherwise might have been rather arid denunciations of imperialists. It is well to remember that both Nationalists and Communists have struck this note.

===== COVID-19 =====
In China, xenophobia against non-Chinese residents has been inflamed by the COVID-19 pandemic in mainland China, with foreigners being described as "foreign garbage" and targeted for "disposal". Some black people in China were evicted from their homes by police and told to leave China within 24 hours, due to disinformation that they and other foreigners were spreading the virus. Expressions of Chinese xenophobia and discriminatory practices, such as the exclusion of black customers from restaurants, were criticized by foreign governments and members of the diplomatic corps.

===== Hong Kong =====
Black people in Hong Kong have experienced negative comments and instances of discrimination in the job market and on public transport. Expats and South Asian minorities have faced increased xenophobia during the COVID-19 pandemic.

===== Persecution of Uighurs =====
Since 2017, China has come under intense international criticism for its treatment of one million Muslims (the majority of them are Uyghurs, a Turkic ethnic minority mostly in Xinjiang) who are being held in re-education camps without any legal process. Critics of the policy have described it as the Sinicization of Xinjiang and some have also called it an ethnocide or a cultural genocide.

==== Indonesia ====
A number of discriminatory laws against Chinese Indonesians were enacted by the government of Indonesia. In 1959, President Sukarno approved PP 10/1959 that forced Chinese Indonesians to close their businesses in rural areas and relocate into urban areas. Moreover, political pressures in the 1970s and 1980s restricted the role of the Chinese Indonesian in politics, academics, and the military. As a result, they were thereafter constrained professionally to becoming entrepreneurs and professional managers in trade, manufacturing, and banking. In 1998, Indonesia riots over higher food prices and rumors of hoarding by merchants and shopkeepers often degenerated into anti-Chinese attacks.

Native Papuans in the country have faced racism, and several reports have accused Indonesia of committing a "slow-motion genocide" in West Papua. Hostility towards the LGBT community has been recently reported, especially in Aceh.

==== Japan ====
During its Edo period, Japan had successfully isolated itself from the outside world, allowing anti-foreign sentiments and myths to multiply unchecked by actual observation. In 2005, a United Nations report expressed concerns about racism in Japan and it also stated that the government's recognition of the depth of the problem was not total. The author of the report, Doudou Diène (Special Rapporteur of the UN Commission on Human Rights), concluded after a nine-day investigation that racial discrimination and xenophobia in Japan primarily affected three groups: national minorities, Latin Americans of Japanese descent, mainly Japanese Brazilians, and foreigners from poor countries. Surveys conducted in 2017 and 2019 have shown that 40 to nearly 50% of the foreigners who were surveyed have experienced some form of discrimination. Another report has also noted differences in how the media and some Japanese treat visitors from the West as compared to those from East Asia, with the latter being viewed much less positively than the former.

Japan accepted just 16 refugees in 1999, while the United States took in 85,010 for resettlement, according to the UNHCR. New Zealand, which is 30 times smaller than Japan, accepted 1,140 refugees in 1999. Just 305 persons were recognized as refugees by Japan from 1981, when Japan ratified the UN Convention Relating to the Status of Refugees, to 2002. Former Prime Minister Taro Aso called Japan a "one race" nation. A 2019 Ipsos poll also suggested that Japanese respondents had a relatively lower sympathy for refugees compared to most other countries in the survey.

Sharon Yoon and Yuki Asahina argue that Zaitokukai, a right-wing organization, succeeded in framing Korean minorities as undeserving recipients of Japanese welfare benefits. Even as Zaitokukai declined, the perceptions of a Korean internal threat powerfully influences public fears.

==== Malaysia ====
The racial tension between the dominant poor Malay Muslims and the minority wealthier Chinese has long characterized Malaysia. It was a major factor in the separation of Singapore in 1965 to become an independent, primarily Chinese nation. Amy L. Freedman points to the electoral system, the centrality of ethnic parties, gerrymandering, and systematic discrimination against the Chinese in education and jobs as critical factors in xenophobia. Recently the goal of creating a more inclusive national identity has been emphasized.

In Malaysia, xenophobia occurs regardless of race. Most xenophobia is towards foreign labourers, who normally came from Indonesia, Bangladesh and Africa. There is also a significant degree of xenophobia towards neighbouring Singaporeans and Indonesians.

==== South Korea ====
Xenophobia in South Korea has been recognized by scholars and the United Nations as a widespread social problem. An increase in immigration to South Korea since the 2000s catalyzed more overt expressions of racism, as well as criticism of those expressions. Newspapers have frequently reported on and criticized discrimination against immigrants, in forms such as being paid lower than the minimum wage, having their wages withheld, unsafe work conditions, physical abuse, or general denigration.

After 2010, xenophobia became increasingly prevalent in the widely used social media. Jiyeon Kang reports a common pattern scapegoating dark-skinned migrants by gender, race and class. They are presented as accomplices and beneficiaries of the elite coalition allegedly taking traditional rights away from South Korean male citizens.

In a 2010–2014 World Values Survey, 44.2% of South Koreans reported they would not want an immigrant or foreign worker as a neighbor. Racist attitudes are more commonly expressed towards immigrants from other Asian countries and Africa, and less so towards European and white North American immigrants who can occasionally receive what has been described as "overly kind treatment". Related discrimination have also been reported with regards to mixed-race children, Chinese Korean, and North Korean immigrants.

==== Thailand ====
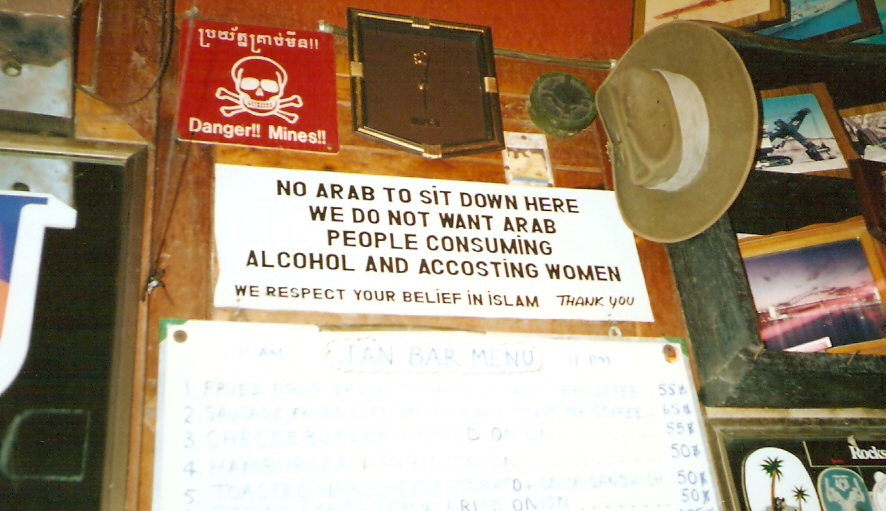
Anti-Arab sign in Pattaya Beach, Thailand

There are no laws within the Kingdom of Thailand which criminalize racial discrimination and the use of racist cliches. Unlike neighboring nations which were colonized, Thailand's history as an uncolonized state further shaped its existing laws.

Anti-refugee sentiment has been significant in Thailand, with a 2016 Amnesty International survey indicating that 74% of surveyed Thais do not believe (to varying degrees) that people should be able to take refuge in other countries to escape war or persecution.

=== Middle East ===
In 2008, a Pew Research Center survey found that negative views concerning Jews were most common in the three predominantly Arab nations which were polled, with 97% of Lebanese having an unfavorable opinion of Jews, 95% of Egyptians and 96% of Jordanians.

==== Egypt ====
The Egyptian Muslim Brotherhood leader Mohammed Mahdi Akef has denounced what he called "the myth of the Holocaust" in defense of the former-Iranian president Mahmoud Ahmadinejad's denial of it. In an article in October 2000 columnist Adel Hammoda alleged in the state-owned Egyptian newspaper al-Ahram that Jews make Matza from the blood of non-Jewish children (see Blood libel). Mohammed Salmawy, the editor of Al-Ahram Hebdo, "defended the use of old European myths like the blood libel against Jews" in his newspapers.

==== Jordan ====
Jordan does not allow entry to Jews who have visible signs of Judaism or possess personal religious items. The Jordanian ambassador to Israel replied to a complaint by a religious Jew who was denied entry by stating that security concerns required that travelers who are entering the Hashemite Kingdom should not do so with prayer shawls (Tallit) and phylacteries (Tefillin). Jordanian authorities state that the policy is to ensure the Jewish tourists' safety.

In July 2009, six Breslov Hasidim were deported after attempting to enter Jordan to visit the tomb of Aaron / Sheikh Harun on Mount Hor, near Petra. The group had taken a ferry from Sinai, Egypt because they understood that Jordanian authorities were making it hard for visible Jews to enter their country from Israel.

==== Israel ====
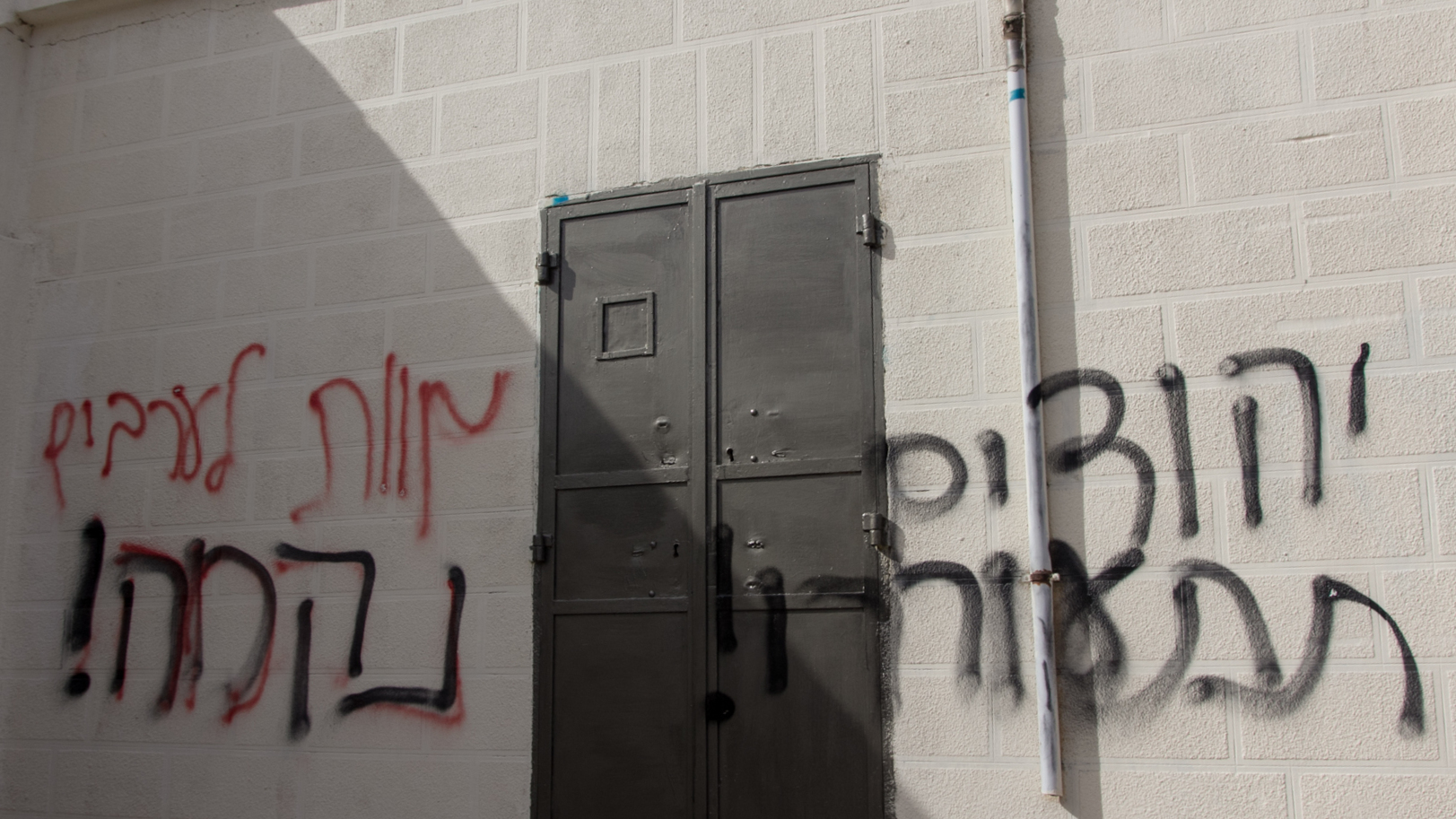
Price tag graffiti in Hebrew reading "Jews Wake up!", "Death to Arabs", and "Revenge!" on a Palestinian home in the West Bank, 2014

According to the 2004 U.S. State Department Country Reports on Human Rights Practices for Israel and the Occupied Territories, the Israeli government had done "little to reduce institutional, legal, and societal discrimination against the country's Arab citizens." The 2005 US Department of State report on Israel wrote: "[T]he government generally respected the human rights of its citizens; however, there were problems in some areas, including... institutional, legal, and societal discrimination against the country's Arab citizens."

The 2010 U.S. State Department Country Report stated that Israeli law prohibits discrimination on the basis of race, and the Israeli government effectively enforced these prohibitions. Former Likud MK and Minister of Defense Moshe Arens has criticized the treatment of minorities in Israel, saying that they did not bear the full obligation of Israeli citizenship, nor were they extended the full privileges of citizenship.

The Association for Civil Rights in Israel (ACRI) published reports which documented racism in Israel, and the 2007 report suggested that anti-Arab racism was increasing in the country. One analysis of the report summarized it thus: "Over two-thirds of Israeli teens believe that Arabs are less intelligent, uncultured and violent. The Israeli government spokesman responded that the Israeli government was "committed to fighting racism whenever it raises its ugly head and is committed to full equality to all Israeli citizens, irrespective of ethnicity, creed or background, as defined by our declaration of independence". Isi Leibler of the Jerusalem Center for Public affairs argues that Israeli Jews are troubled by "increasingly hostile, even treasonable outbursts by Israeli Arabs against the state" while it is at war with neighboring countries. Khaled Diab of The Guardian wrote in 2012 that demonisation was a two-way street, with Palestinians in Israel reportedly holding negative stereotypes of Israelis as devious, violent, cunning and untrustworthy.

A 2018 poll by Pew Research Center also suggested there to be particularly widespread anti-refugee sentiment among surveyed Israelis compared to the people from other selected countries. Israeli people also have a long history of discrimination towards Palestinians

==== Kuwait ====
In April 2020, an actress said on Kuwaiti TV that migrants should be thrown out "into the desert", amidst reported exploitation of foreign labourers in the country. Reports of Sierra Leonean, Indonesian and Nepalese workers suffering abuse in Kuwait have prompted the 3 countries' governments to ban its citizens from being employed as domestic workers there. Expat surveys done by InterNations have ranked the country amongst the most unfriendly for expatriates.

==== Lebanon ====
Hezbollah's Al-Manar TV channel has often been accused of airing antisemitic broadcasts, accusing the Jews/Zionists of conspiring against the Arab world, and frequently airing excerpts from The Protocols of the Elders of Zion, which the Encyclopædia Britannica describes as a "fraudulent document which served as a pretext and rationale for anti-Semitism in the early 20th century". In another incident, an Al-Manar commentator recently referred to "Zionist attempts to transmit AIDS to Arab countries". Al-Manar officials denied broadcasting any antisemitic incitement and they also stated that their group's position is anti-Israeli, not antisemitic. However, Hezbollah has directed strong rhetoric against both Israel and Jews, and it has cooperated in publishing and distributing outright antisemitic literature. The government of Lebanon has not criticized Hezbollah's continued broadcast of antisemitic material on television.

There are also substantial accounts of abuses against migrant domestic workers in Lebanon, notably from Ethiopia, Bangladesh, the Philippines, Sri Lanka, Sudan, and other countries in Asia and Africa, exacerbated by the Kafala system, or "sponsorship system". Increases in abuse occurred during the COVID-19 pandemic.

==== Palestine ====
Various Palestinian organizations and individuals have been regularly accused of being antisemitic. Howard Gutman believes that much of Muslim hatred of Jews stems from the ongoing Arab–Israeli conflict and that peace would significantly reduce antisemitism.

Anti-US and anti-Israeli sentiment had led some Palestinians to support the 2001 September 11 attacks in New York. In August 2003, senior Hamas official Dr Abd Al-Aziz Al-Rantisi wrote in the Hamas newspaper Al-Risala:

It is no longer a secret that the Zionists were behind the Nazis' murder of many Jews, and agreed to it, with the aim of intimidating them and forcing them to immigrate to Palestine.

In August 2009, Hamas refused to allow Palestinian children to learn about the Holocaust, which it called "a lie invented by the Zionists" and referred to Holocaust education as a "war crime". A 2016 Gallup International poll had roughly 74% of Palestinian respondents agreeing there was religious superiority, 78% agreeing there was racial superiority, and 76% agreeing there was cultural superiority. The percentages were among the highest out of 66 nations surveyed.

==== Saudi Arabia ====
Racism in Saudi Arabia is practiced against labor workers who are foreigners, mostly from developing countries.

Asian maids who work in the country have been victims of racism and other forms of discrimination, foreign workers have been raped, exploited, under- or unpaid, physically abused, overworked and locked in their places of employment. The international organisation Human Rights Watch (HRW) describes these conditions as "near-slavery" and attributes them to "deeply rooted gender, religious, and racial discrimination". In many cases the workers are unwilling to report their employers for fear of losing their jobs or further abuse.

There were several cases of antisemitism in Saudi Arabia and it is common within the country's religious circles. The Saudi Arabian media often attacks Jews in books, in news articles, in its Mosques and with what some describe as antisemitic satire. Saudi Arabian government officials and state religious leaders often promote the idea that Jews are conspiring to take over the entire world; as proof of their claims they publish and frequently cite The Protocols of the Elders of Zion as factual.

=== Europe ===
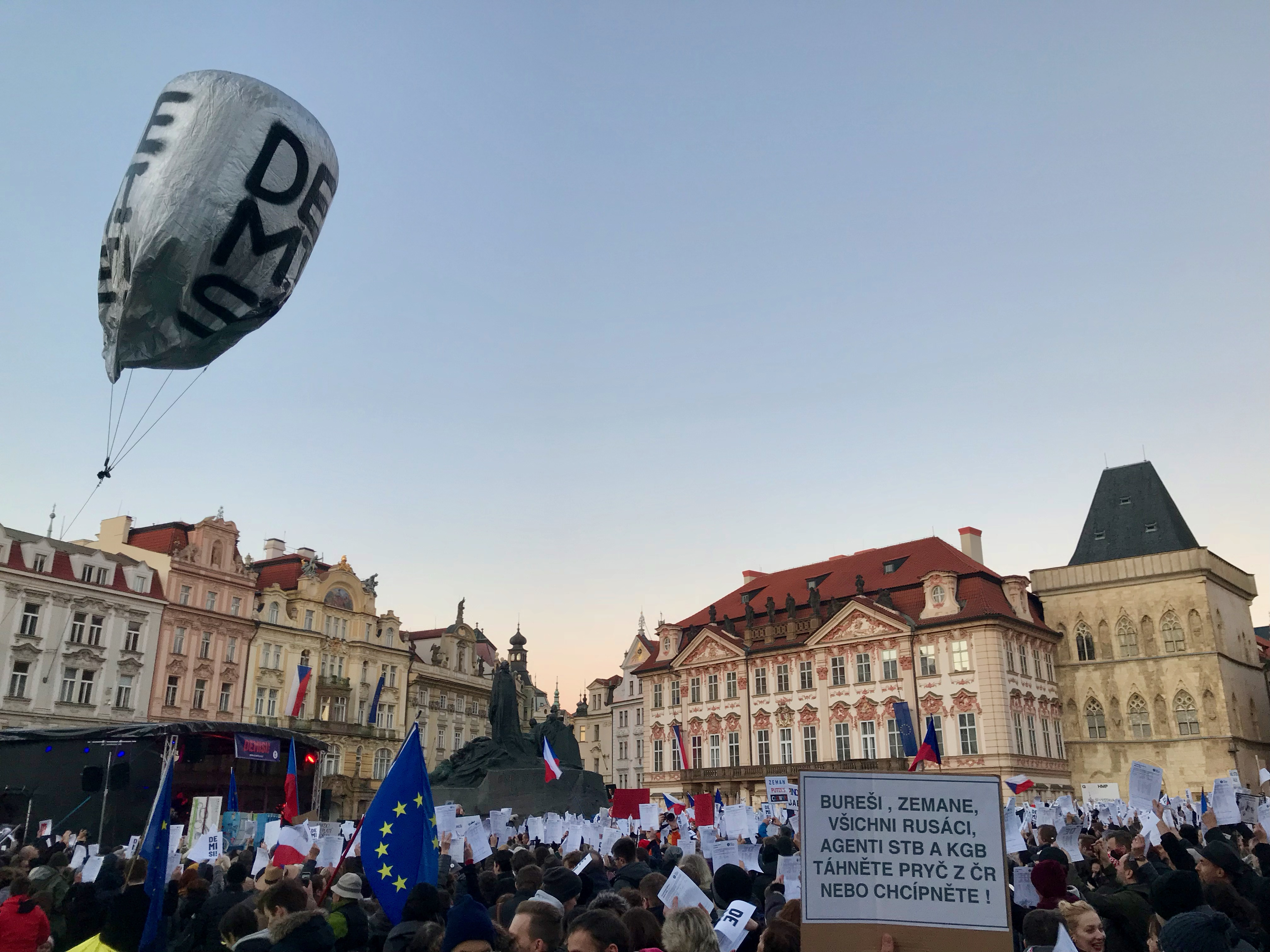
Pro-EU Czechs protest in Prague against politicians accused of pro-Russian sympathies, 17 November 2018. The sign reads: "...all Russians...go away from the Czech Republic or die!"

A study that ran from 2002 to 2015 mapped the countries in Europe with the highest incidents of racial bias towards black people, based on data from 288,076 white Europeans. It used the Implicit-association test (a reaction-based psychological test designed to measure implicit racial bias). The strongest bias was found in Czech Republic, Lithuania, Belarus, Ukraine, Malta, Moldova, Bulgaria, Italy, Slovakia, and Portugal. A 2017 report by the University of Oslo Center for Research on Extremism tentatively suggests that "individuals of Muslim background stand out among perpetrators of antisemitic violence in Western Europe".

Negative views of Muslims have varied across different parts of Europe, and Islamophobic hate crimes have been reported across the region. A 2017 Chatham House poll of more than 10,000 people in 10 European countries had on average 55% agreeing that all further migration from Muslim-majority countries should be stopped, while 20% disagreed. Majority opposition was found in Poland (71%), Austria (65%), Belgium (64%), Hungary (64%), France (61%), Greece (58%), Germany (53%), and Italy (51%).

Unfavorable views of Muslims, 2019
Country	Percent
Poland	66%
Czech Republic	64%
Hungary	58%
Greece	57%
Lithuania	56%
Italy	55%
Spain	42%
Sweden	28%
Germany	24%
France	22%
Russia	19%
United Kingdom	18%

==== Belgium ====
Over a hundred antisemitic attacks were recorded in Belgium in 2009. This was a 100% increase from the year before. The perpetrators were usually young males of immigrant background from the Middle East. In 2009, the Belgian city of Antwerp, often referred to as Europe's last shtetl, experienced a surge in antisemitic violence. Bloeme Evers-Emden, an Amsterdam resident and Auschwitz survivor, was quoted in the newspaper Aftenposten in 2010: "The antisemitism now is even worse than before the Holocaust. The antisemitism has become more violent. Now they are threatening to kill us."

==== France ====
In 2004, France experienced rising levels of Islamic antisemitism and acts that were publicized around the world. In 2006, rising levels of antisemitism were recorded in French schools. Reports related to the tensions between the children of North African Muslim immigrants and North African Jewish children. The climax was reached when Ilan Halimi was tortured to death by the so-called "Barbarians gang", led by Youssouf Fofana. In 2007, over 7,000 members of the community petitioned for asylum in the United States, citing antisemitism in France.

In the first half of 2009, an estimated 631 recorded acts of antisemitism took place in France, more than the whole of 2008. Speaking to the World Jewish Congress in December 2009, the French Interior Minister Hortefeux described the acts of antisemitism as "a poison to our republic". He also announced that he would appoint a special coordinator for fighting racism and antisemitism.

==== Germany ====
The period after Germany's loss of World War I led to the increased espousal of antisemitism and other forms of racism in the country's political discourse, for example, emotions which were initially expressed by members of the right-wing Freikorps finally culminated in the ascent of Adolf Hitler and the Nazi Party in 1933. The Nazi Party's racial policy and the Nuremberg Race Laws against Jews and other non-Aryans represented the most explicit racist policies in twentieth century Europe. These laws deprived all Jews (including half-Jews and quarter-Jews) and all other non-Aryans of German citizenship. The official title of Jews became "subjects of the state". At first, the Nuremberg Race Laws only forbade racially mixed sexual relationships and marriages between Aryans and Jews but later they were extended to "Gypsies, Negroes or their bastard offspring". Such interracial relationships were known as "racial pollution" Rassenschande, and they became a criminal and punishable offence under the race laws. The Nazi racial theory regarded Poles and other Slavic peoples as racially inferior Untermenschen. Nazi Germany's Directive No.1306 stated: "Polishness equals subhumanity. Poles, Jews and gypsies are on the same inferior level."

After the 1950s the steady arrival of Turkish workers led to xenophobia.

According to a 2012 survey, 18% of Turks in Germany believe that Jews are inferior human beings.

==== Hungary ====
Anti-refugee sentiment has been strong in Hungary, and Hungarian authorities along the border have been accused of detaining migrants under harsh conditions with some reported instances of beatings and other violence from the guards. Surveys from Pew Research Center have also suggested that negative views of refugees and Muslims are held by the majority of the country's locals.

As in other European countries, the Romani people faced disadvantages, including unequal treatment, discrimination, segregation and harassment. Negative stereotypes are often linked to Romani unemployment and reliance on state benefits. In 2008 and 2009 nine attacks took place against Romani in Hungary, resulting in six deaths and multiple injuries. According to the Hungarian curia (supreme court), these murders were motivated by anti-Romani sentiment and sentenced the perpetrators to life imprisonment.

==== Italy ====
A new party emerged in the 1980s, Lega Nord. According to Gilda Zazzara, it started with identity-based claims and secessionist proposals for the north to break away from southern Italy. It shifted to xenophobia and the demand that job priority be accorded to native Italian workers.

Anti-Romani sentiment in Italy takes the form of hostility, prejudice, discrimination or racism directed at Romani people. There's no reliable data for the total number of Roma people living in Italy, but estimates put it between 140,000 and 170,000. Many national and local political leaders engaged in rhetoric during 2007 and 2008 that maintained that the extraordinary rise in crime at the time was mainly a result of uncontrolled immigration of people of Roma origin from recent European Union member state Romania. National and local leaders declared their plans to expel Roma from settlements in and around major cities and to deport illegal immigrants. The mayors of Rome and Milan signed "Security Pacts" in May 2007 that "envisaged the forced eviction of up to 10,000 Romani people".

According to a May 2008 poll 68% of Italians, wanted to see all of the country's approximately 150,000 Gypsies, many of them Italian citizens, expelled. The survey, published as mobs in Naples burned down Gypsy camps that month, revealed that the majority also wanted all Gypsy camps in Italy to be demolished.

==== Netherlands ====
The first example for xenophobic riot in the Netherlands were the riots in Afrikaanderwijk, in which the houses of Turkish people were attacked and windows were smashed.

In early 2012 the Dutch right-wing Party for Freedom established an anti-Slavic (predominantly anti-Polish) and anti-Romani website, where native Dutch people could air their frustration about losing their job because of cheaper workers from Poland, Bulgaria, Romania and other non-Germanic Central and Eastern European countries. This led to commentaries involving hate speech and other racial prejudice mainly against Poles and Roma, but also aimed at other Central and Eastern European ethnic groups. According to a 2015 report by the OECD and EU Commission, 37% of young people born in the country with immigrant parents say they had experienced discrimination in their lives.

In the Netherlands, antisemitic incidents, from verbal abuse to violence, are reported, allegedly connected with Islamic youth, mostly boys of Moroccan descent. A phrase made popular during football matches against the so-called Jewish football club Ajax has been adopted by Muslim youth and is frequently heard at pro-Palestinian demonstrations: "Hamas, Hamas, Jews to the gas!" According to the Centre for Information and Documentation on Israel, a pro-Israel lobby group in the Netherlands, in 2009, the number of antisemitic incidents in Amsterdam, the city that is home to most of the approximately 40,000 Dutch Jews, doubled compared to 2008.

==== Norway ====
In 2010, the Norwegian Broadcasting Corporation after one year of research, revealed that antisemitism was common among Norwegian Muslims. Teachers at schools with large shares of Muslims revealed that Muslim students often "praise or admire Adolf Hitler for his killing of Jews", that "Jew-hate is legitimate within vast groups of Muslim students," and "Muslims laugh or command [teachers] to stop when trying to educate about the Holocaust." Additionally that "while some students might protest when some express support for terrorism, none object when students express hate of Jews" and that it says in "the Quran that you shall kill Jews, all true Muslims hate Jews." Most of these students were said to be born and raised in Norway. One Jewish father also told that his child after school had been taken by a Muslim mob (though managed to escape), reportedly "to be taken out to the forest and hanged because he was a Jew".

==== Russia ====
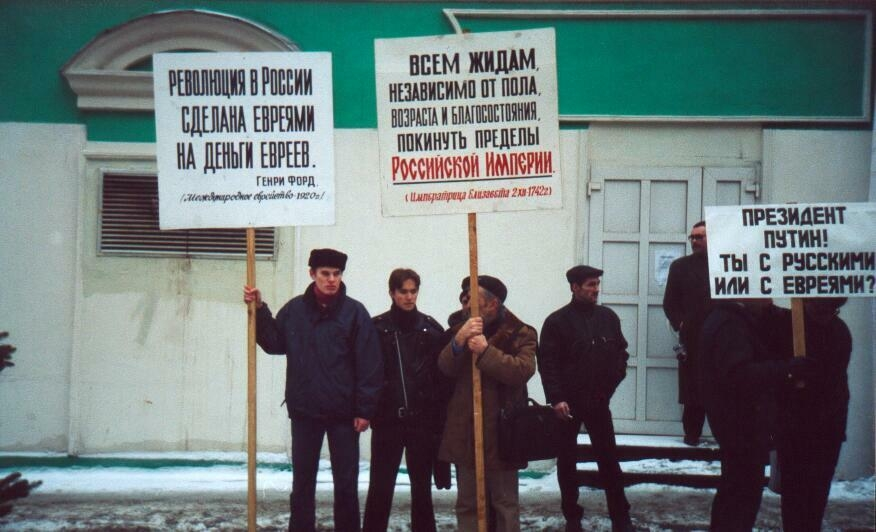
A demonstration in Russia. The antisemitic slogans cite Henry Ford and Empress Elizabeth.

Lien Verpoest explores the era of the Napoleonic wars to identify the formation of conservative ideas ranging from traditionalism to ardent patriotism and xenophobia. Conservatives generally controlled Russia in the 19th century, and imposed xenophobia in education and the academy. In the late 19th century, especially after nationalistic uprisings in Poland in the 1860s, the government displayed xenophobia in its hostility toward ethnic minorities that did not speak Russian. The decision was to reduce the use of other languages, and insist on Russification.

By the beginning of the 20th century, most European Jews lived in the so-called Pale of Settlement, the Western frontier of the Russian Empire consisting generally of the modern-day countries of Poland, Lithuania, Belarus and neighboring regions. Many pogroms accompanied the Revolution of 1917 and the ensuing Russian Civil War, an estimated 70,000 to 250,000 civilian Jews were killed in the atrocities throughout the former Russian Empire; the number of Jewish orphans exceeded 300,000.

During the civil war era (1917–1922) both the Bolsheviks and the Whites employed nationalism and xenophobia as weapons to delegitimise the opposition.

After World War II official national policy was to bring in students from Communist countries in East Europe and Asia for advanced training in Communist leadership roles. These students encountered severe xenophobia on campus. They survived by sticking together, but developed a hostility toward the Soviet leadership. Even after the fall of Communism foreign students faced hostility on campus.

In the 2000s, "skinheads" were especially visible in attacking anything foreign. Racism against both the Russian citizens (peoples of the Caucasus, indigenous peoples of Siberia and Russian Far East, etc.) and non-Russian citizens of Africans, Central Asians, South Asians(Indians,Pakistanis,etc), East Asians (Vietnamese, Chinese, etc.) and Europeans (Ukrainians, etc.) became a significant factor.

Using surveys from 1996, 2004, and 2012, Hannah S. Chapman, et al. reports a steady increase in Russians' negative attitudes toward seven outgroups. Muscovites especially became more xenophobic. In 2016, Radio Free Europe/Radio Liberty reported that "Researchers who track xenophobia in Russia have recorded an "impressive" decrease in hate crimes as the authorities appear to have stepped up pressure on far-right groups". David Barry uses surveys to investigate the particularistic and xenophobic belief that all citizens should join Russia's dominant Orthodox religion. It is widespread among ethnic Russians and is increasing.

A 2016 GlobeScan/BBC World Service poll found that 79% of Russian respondents disapproved of accepting Syrian refugees, the highest percentage out of 18 countries surveyed.

==== Sweden ====
A government study in 2006 estimated that 5% of the total adult population and 39% of adult Muslims "harbour systematic antisemitic views". The former prime minister Göran Persson described these results as "surprising and terrifying". However, the rabbi of Stockholm's Orthodox Jewish community, Meir Horden, said, "It's not true to say that the Swedes are antisemitic. Some of them are hostile to Israel because they support the weak side, which they perceive the Palestinians to be."

In March 2010, Fredrik Sieradzk told Die Presse, an Austrian Internet publication, that Jews are being "harassed and physically attacked" by "people from the Middle East", although he added that only a small number of Malmö's 40,000 Muslims "exhibit hatred of Jews". Sieradzk also stated that approximately 30 Jewish families have emigrated from Malmö to Israel in the past year, specifically to escape from harassment. Also in March, the Swedish newspaper Skånska Dagbladet reported that attacks on Jews in Malmö totaled 79 in 2009, about twice as many as the previous year, according to police statistics. In December 2010, the Jewish human rights organization Simon Wiesenthal Center issued a travel advisory concerning Sweden, advising Jews to express "extreme caution" when visiting the southern parts of the country due to an increase in verbal and physical harassment of Jewish citizens by Muslims in the city of Malmö.

==== Switzerland ====
Swiss "Confederation Commission Against Racism" which is part of the Swiss "Federal Department of Home Affairs" published a 2004 report, Black People in Switzerland: A Life between Integration and Discrimination (published in German, French, and Italian only). According to this report, discrimination based on skin colour in Switzerland is not exceptional, and affects immigrants decades after their immigration.

Swiss People's Party claims that Swiss communities have a democratic right to decide who can or cannot be Swiss. In addition, the report said "Official statements and political campaigns that present immigrants from the EU in a favourable light and immigrants from elsewhere in a bad light must stop", according to the Swiss Federal Statistics Office in 2006, 85.5% of the foreign residents in Switzerland are European. The United Nations special rapporteur on racism, Doudou Diène, has observed that Switzerland suffers from racism, discrimination and xenophobia. The UN envoy explained that although the Swiss authorities recognised the existence of racism and xenophobia, they did not view the problem as being serious. Diène pointed out that representatives of minority communities said they experienced serious racism and discrimination, notably for access to public services (e.g. health care), employment and lodging.

The 2009 Swiss minaret referendum banned the construction of new minarets—towers traditionally attached to mosques—by a 57 to 43 popular vote of the country. In the 2021 Swiss referendums, the electorate banned the wearing of a full face covering, which some Orthodox Muslim women wear.

==== Ukraine ====
Israel's Antisemitism Report for 2017 stated that "A striking exception in the trend of decrease in antisemitic incidents in Eastern Europe was Ukraine, where the number of recorded antisemitic attacks was doubled from last year and surpassed the tally for all the incidents reported throughout the entire region combined." Ukrainian state historian, Vladimir Vyatrovich dismissed the Israeli report as anti-Ukrainian propaganda and a researcher of antisemitism from Ukraine, Vyacheslav Likhachev said the Israeli report was flawed and amateurish.

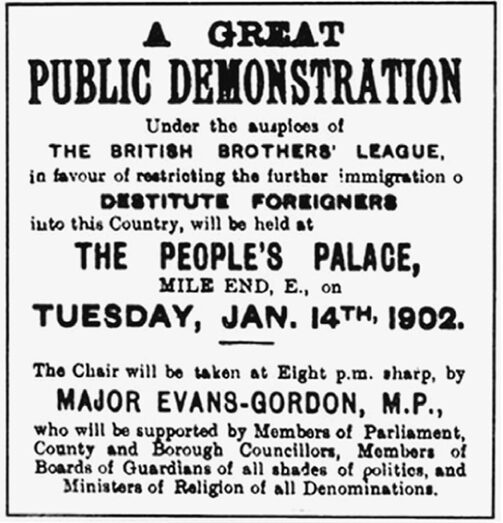
1902 rally in London, England, against destitute foreigners

==== United Kingdom ====
The extent and the targets of xenophobic attitudes in the United Kingdom have varied over time. It has resulted in cases of discrimination, riots and racially motivated murders. Racism and Xenophobia were mitigated by the attitudes and norms of the British class system during the 19th century, in which race and nationality mattered less than social distinction: a black African tribal chief was unquestionably superior to a white English costermonger. Use of the word "racism" became more widespread after 1936, although the term "race hatred" was used in the late 1920s by sociologist Frederick Hertz. Laws, including the Race Relations Act 1965, were passed in the 1960s that specifically prohibited racial discrimination.

At the 1517 Evil May Day riots in London, protestors attacked the prominence of foreigners in London wool and cloth businesses; historians have called the event xenophobic. Xenophobia in popular literature targeted Germans in the early 20th centuries, based on fears of militarism and espionage.

According to scholar Julia Lovell, there has been a history of sinophobia dating back to the early 20th century, propagated by writers like Charles Dickens, which has endured to the present day with current media depictions of China.

Racism has been observed as having a correlation between factors such as levels of unemployment and immigration in an area. Some studies suggest Brexit led to a rise in racist incidents, where locals became hostile to foreigners.

Studies published in 2014 and 2015 suggested that racism was on the rise in the UK, with more than one third of those polled admitting they were racially prejudiced. However a 2019 EU survey, Being Black in the EU, ranked the UK as the least racist in the 12 Western European countries surveyed.

Sectarianism between Ulster Protestants and Irish Catholics in Northern Ireland has been called a form of racism by some international bodies. It has resulted in widespread discrimination, segregation and serious violence, especially during partition and the Troubles.

During the acrimonious Brexit debate, xenophobia increased in London, especially against French living in the city.

=== Africa ===
==== Ivory Coast ====
Ivory Coast has a history of ethnic tribal hatred and religious intolerance. In addition to the many victims among the various tribes of the northern and southern regions of the country that have perished in the ongoing conflict, white foreigners residing or visiting Ivory Coast have also been subjected to violent attacks. According to a report by Human Rights Watch, the Ivory Coast government is guilty of fanning ethnic hatred for its own political ends.

In 2004, the Young Patriots of Abidjan, a strongly nationalist organisation, rallied by the state media, plundered possessions of foreign nationals in Abidjan. Calls for violence against whites and non-Ivorians were broadcast on national radio and TV after the Young Patriots seized control of its offices. Rapes, beatings, and murders of persons of European and Lebanese descent followed. Thousands of expatriates and white or ethnic Lebanese Ivorians fled the country. The attacks drew international condemnation.

==== Mauritania ====
Slavery in Mauritania persists despite its abolition in 1980 and mostly affects the descendants of black Africans abducted into slavery who now live in Mauritania as "black Moors" or haratin and who partially still serve the "white Moors", or bidhan, as slaves. The practice of slavery in Mauritania is most dominant within the traditional upper class of the Moors. For centuries, the haratin lower class, mostly poor black Africans living in rural areas, have been considered natural slaves by these Moors. Social attitudes have changed among most urban Moors, but in rural areas, the ancient divide remains.

==== Niger ====
In October 2006, Niger announced that it would deport to Chad the "Diffa Arabs", Arabs living in the Diffa region of eastern Niger. Their population numbered about 150,000. While the government was rounding up Arabs in preparation for the deportation, two girls died, reportedly after fleeing government forces, and three women suffered miscarriages. Niger's government eventually suspended their controversial decision to deport the Arabs.

==== South Africa ====
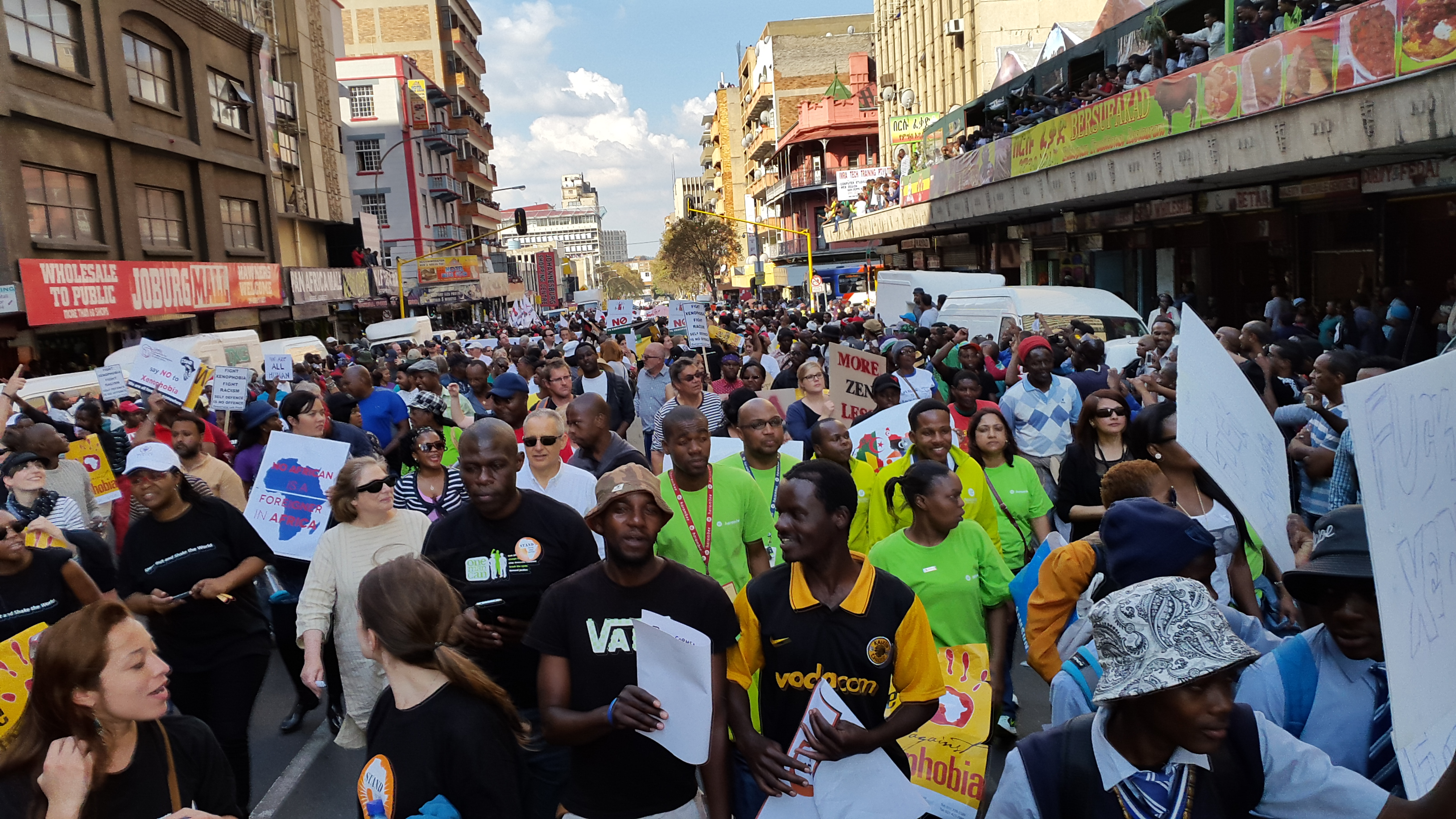
March against xenophobia in South Africa, Johannesburg, 23 April 2015

Xenophobia in South Africa has been present in both the apartheid and post–apartheid eras. Hostility between the British and Boers exacerbated by the Second Boer War led to rebellion by poor Afrikaners who looted British-owned shops. South Africa also passed numerous acts intended to keep out Indians, such as the Immigrants Regulation Act of 1913, which provided for the exclusion of "undesirables", a group of people that included Indians. This effectively halted Indian immigration. The Township Franchise Ordinance of 1924 was intended to "deprive Indians of municipal franchise". Xenophobic attitudes toward the Chinese have also been present, sometimes in the form of robberies or hijackings, and a hate speech case in 2018 was put to court the year later with 11 offenders on trial.

In 1994 and 1995, gangs of armed youth destroyed the homes of foreign nationals living in Johannesburg, demanding that the police work to repatriate them to their home countries. In 2008, a widely documented spate of xenophobic attacks occurred in Johannesburg. It is estimated that tens of thousands of migrants were displaced; property, businesses and homes were widely looted. The death toll after the attack stood at 56.

In 2015, another widely documented series of xenophobic attacks occurred in South Africa, mostly against migrant Zimbabweans. This followed remarks by Zulu King Goodwill Zwelithini kaBhekuzulu stating that the migrants should "pack their bags and leave". As of 20 April 2015, 7 people had died and more than 2000 foreigners had been displaced.

Following the riots and murders of other Africans from 2008 and 2015, violence again broke out in 2019.

==== Sudan ====
In the Sudan, black African captives in the civil war were often enslaved, and female prisoners were often abused sexually, with their Arab captors claiming that Islamic law grants them permission. According to CBS News, slaves have been sold for US$50 apiece. In September 2000, the U.S. State Department alleged that "the Sudanese government's support of slavery and its continued military action which has resulted in numerous deaths are due in part to the victims' religious beliefs." Jok Madut Jok, professor of history at Loyola Marymount University, states that the abduction of women and children of the south is slavery by any definition. The government of Sudan insists that the whole matter is no more than the traditional tribal feuding over resources.

==== Uganda ====
Former British colonies in Sub-Saharan Africa have many citizens of South Asian descent. They were brought by the British Empire from British India to do clerical work in imperial service. The most prominent case of anti-Indian racism was the ethnic cleansing of the Indian (called Asian) minority in Uganda by the strongman dictator and human rights violator Idi Amin.

=== Oceania ===
==== Australia ====
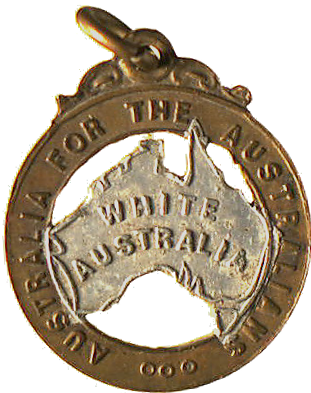
This badge from 1910 was produced by the Australian Natives' Association, comprising Australian-born whites.

The Immigration Restriction Act 1901 (White Australia policy) effectively barred people of non-European descent from immigrating to Australia. There was never any specific policy titled "White Australia." The term was invented later to encapsulate a collection of policies that were designed to exclude people from Asia (particularly China) and the Pacific Islands (particularly Melanesia) from immigrating to Australia.

The Menzies and Holt governments effectively dismantled the policies between 1949 and 1966 and the Whitlam government passed laws to ensure that race would be totally disregarded as a component for immigration to Australia in 1973.

The 2005 Cronulla riots were a series of race riots and outbreaks of mob violence in Sydney's southern suburb Cronulla which resulted from strained relations between Anglo-Celtic and (predominantly Muslim) Lebanese Australians. Travel warnings for Australia were issued by some countries but were later removed. In December 2005, a fight broke out between a group of volunteer surf lifesavers and Lebanese youth. These incidents were considered to be a key factor in a racially motivated confrontation the following weekend. Violence spread to other southern suburbs of Sydney, where more assaults occurred, including two stabbings and attacks on ambulances and police officers.

On 30 May 2009, Indian students protested against what they claimed were racist attacks, blocking streets in central Melbourne. Thousands of students gathered outside the Royal Melbourne Hospital where one of the victims was admitted. In light of this event, the Australian Government started a Helpline for Indian students to report such incidents. The United Nations High Commissioner for Human Rights, Navi Pillay, termed these attacks "disturbing" and called for Australia to investigate the matters further.

== In tourism research ==
In tourism research, xenophobia has been operationalised as tourist xenophobia, defined as a tourist's perceptual discomfort and anxiety in relation to strangers encountered at foreign destinations. Drawing on social and evolutionary psychology, a measurement scale for the construct was developed and validated across several studies, and scores on it were associated with a range of travel choices, among them willingness to eat local food, preference for organised group tours, purchase of travel insurance and booking through an agency. The construct concerns an individual traveller's response to unfamiliar people encountered while travelling, and is measured as a difference between travellers rather than as a property of destinations or populations.

== See also ==
- Afrophobia, hostility towards Africa, Africans and people of African descent
- Anti-intellectualism
- Aporophobia, hostility towards poor people
- Authoritarian personality
- Black genocide conspiracy theory, the notion that African Americans have been subjected to genocide via birth control because of racism against African Americans
- Chauvinism
- Conformity
- Criticism of multiculturalism
- Cultural genocide
- Discrimination based on skin color
- Endophobia, the opposite of Xenophobia.
- Ethnic cleansing
- Ethnocentrism
- Eurabia, the belief that the culture of Europe is being Arabized and Islamized and the belief that Europe's previous alliances with the United States and Israel are being undermined
- European Commission against Racism and Intolerance
- Forced assimilation
- Great replacement, a variant of the white genocide conspiracy theory
- Hispanophobia, hostility towards Spaniards, hostility towards people of Spanish descent, dislike of Spanish culture, dislike of Spain and dislike of the Spanish language
- Index of racism-related articles
- Kalergi Plan conspiracy theory
- List of phobias
- Nationalism
- Nativism (politics)
- Negrophobia (also termed anti-Blackness) is characterized by fear of, hatred of or extreme aversion to Black people and Cape Coloureds or Coloureds, and Black & Colored culture
- Opposition to immigration
- Perpetual foreigner
- Stranger danger
- Supremacism
- Überfremdung, a German term for excessive immigration
- Xenocentrism
- Xenophilia
- Xenoracism
