= Anti-Black racism =

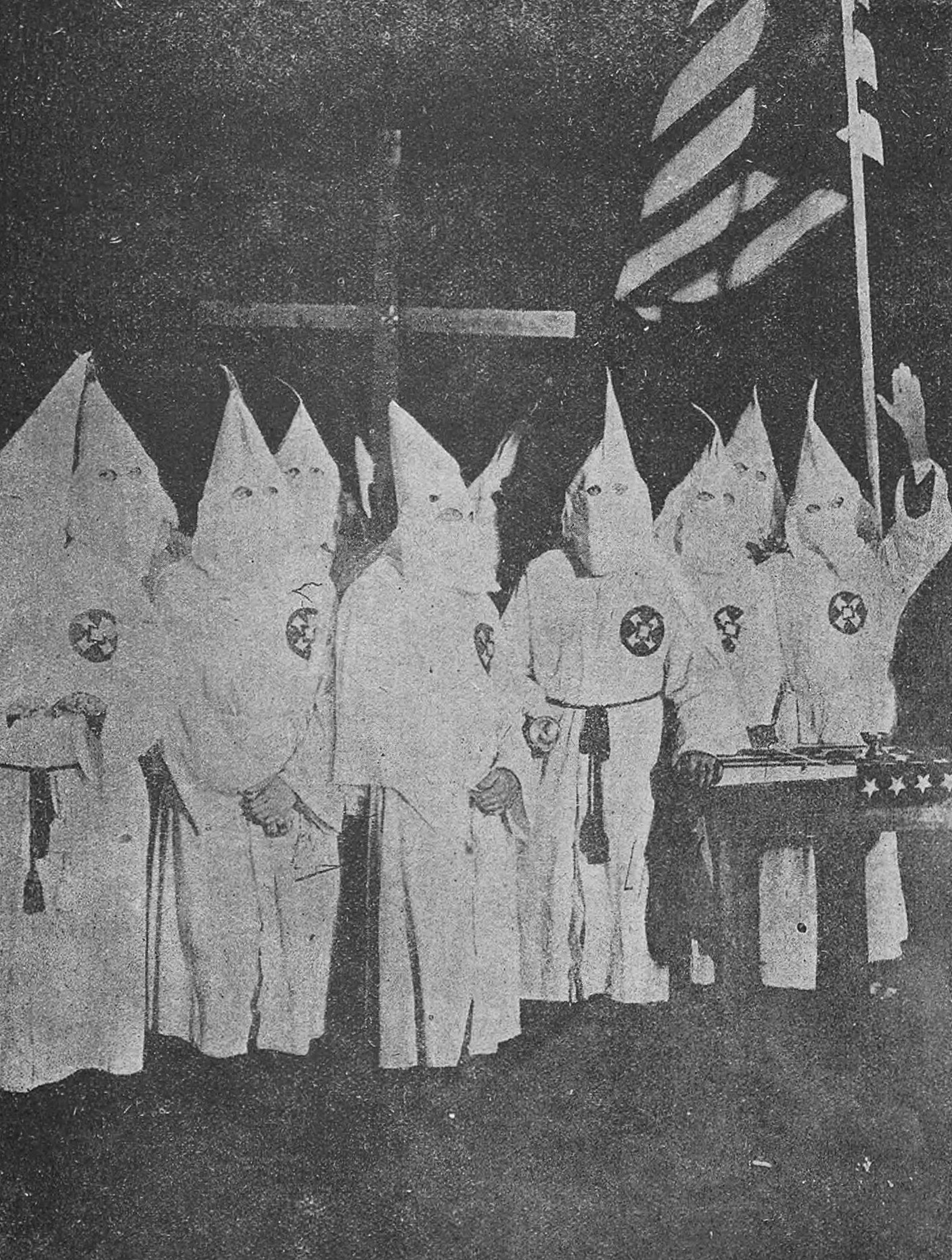
A gathering of White supremacists who are members of the Ku Klux Klan (KKK) in Baltimore in 1923. Designated as a far-right terrorist organization, the KKK first emerged in the American South in the 19th century and it is widely considered the most notorious anti-Black hate group in the country, reaching its peak with approximately six million members in the 1920s.

Anti-Black racism, also called anti-Blackness, colourphobia or negrophobia, is characterised by prejudice, collective hatred, and discrimination or extreme aversion towards people who are racialized as Black (especially those from sub-Saharan Africa and its diasporas), as well as a loathing of Black culture worldwide. Such sentiment includes, but is not limited to, the attribution of negative characteristics to Black people; the fear, strong dislike or dehumanisation of Black men; and the objectification (including sexual objectification) and dehumanisation of Black women.

First defined by Canadian social worker and scholar Akua Benjamin, the term anti-Black racism (ABR) originally described racism towards Black people of sub-Saharan African descent, as shaped by European colonialism and the Atlantic slave trade. The word Black can also apply more widely to other groups, including Pacific and non-Atlantic Blacks (or Blaks), such as Indigenous Australians and Melanesians. As such, anti-Black racism has since been used to refer to racism against Black people more generally. The older terms negrophobia and colourphobia were terms created by American abolitionists to describe racism towards people of Sub-Saharan African descent, who were known at the time as Negroes or Coloured. The term anti-Blackness refers to racism against anyone racialised as Black.

== Concepts ==
=== Terminology ===
Anti-Black racism, sometimes called negrophobia or colourphobia, is discriminatory sentiment towards people racialised as Black, often because the person believes that their race is superior to the Black race. The terms Afrophobia (or Afriphobia) and melanophobia have also been used.

==== Afrophobia ====
Afrophobia, or Afriphobia, is frequently used to describe racism (particularly systemic racism) against Black people of African descent, such as by the European Network Against Racism (ENAR). Others use Afrophobia to describe racism and xenophobia against people of African descent, especially racism and xenophobia against indigenous Africans, due to their perceived Africanness. This sentiment may also include prejudice against African traditions and culture. In South Africa, for example, Afrophobia is used to describe xenophobia against people of other African nationalities for being too racially Black, too culturally African, or both.

==== Anti-Black racism ====
Anti-Black racism was a term used by Canadian scholar Akua Benjamin in a 1992 report on Ontario race relations. It has been defined as follows:

Anti-Black racism is a specific manifestation of racism rooted in European colonialism, slavery and oppression of Black people since the sixteenth century. It is a structure of iniquities in power, resources and opportunities that systematically disadvantages people of African descent.

The term quickly came to be used to refer to racism against other groups also considered Black, such as Indigenous Australians (who sometimes prefer the term Blak) and Melanesians.

==== Melanophobia ====
Melanophobia has been used to refer to both anti-Black racism and colourism (prejudice against people with darker skin), especially in Latin America, the Middle East, and Africa.

==== Negrophobia and colourphobia ====
The term racism is not attested before the 20th century, but negrophobia (first recorded between 1810 and 1820; often capitalised), and later colourphobia (first recorded in 1834), likely originated within the abolitionist movement, where it was used as an analogy to rabies (then called hydrophobia) to describe the "mad dog" mindset behind the pro-slavery cause and its apparently contagious nature. In 1819, the term was used in U.S. Congressional debates to refer to a "violent aversion or hatred of Negroes".

The term negrophobia may also have been inspired by the word nigrophilism, itself first appearing in 1802 in Baudry des Lozières's Les égarements du nigrophilisme. Noting the shift of -phobia terms to cover prejudice and hatred rather than mere fear or aversion, J. L. A. Garcia refers to negrophobia as "the granddaddy of these '-phobia' terms", preceding both xenophobia and homophobia.

Both at the time, and since, critics of the terms negrophobia and colourphobia have argued that, although their use of -phobia is rhetorical, if taken literally they could be used to excuse or justify the behaviour of racists as mental illness or disease. John Dick, publisher of The North Star, voiced such concerns as early as 1848 while legal scholar Jody David Armour has voiced similar concerns in the 21st century. Nevertheless, negrophobia had a clinical and satirical edge that made it popular with abolitionists. In 1856, abolitionist Harriet Beecher Stowe published Dred: A Tale of the Great Dismal Swamp, a novel which explored the fear of Blackness within negrophobia via the titular character Dred, a Black revolutionary Maroon.

==== Changing terminology ====
After abolition, negrophobia continued to be used to refer to anti-Black racism, but terms based on race also appeared around the turn of the 20th century. Racism first appeared in print in 1903. In December 1921, the terms negrophobia and race hatred were used to describe an outbreak of anti-Black violence in the Dominican Republic by John Sydney de Bourg, a spokesman for the local chapter of the Universal Negro Improvement Association in San Pedro de Macorís. Negrophobia further reappeared in January 1927 in Lamine Senghor's La voix des nègres (The Voice of the Negroes), a monthly anti-colonialist newspaper. The term became more widespread outside of North America and the English-speaking world when French Caribbean psychologist and philosopher Frantz Fanon included it in his works Peaux noires masques blancs (Black Skin, White Masks) and Les Damnés de la Terre (The Wretched of the Earth), again drawing on the rhetoric of racism as disease. As a psychiatrist, Fanon explored negrophobia as an individual and societal "neurosis", although he saw it as the psychological structure underpinning colonial racism.

By the middle of the 20th century, the term "Black" came to be preferred over "Negro", and so related terms became outdated. However, negrophobia is still sometimes used to distinguish anti-Black racism from racism more generally. In this sense, Negrophobia may mean an especially strong, violent or transmissible form of anti-Black racism. In France, Une Autre Histoire describes negrophobia as meaning "the most virulent form of racism targeting those who are perceived as 'blacks' by people considering themselves different from 'blacks'" (translation).

=== Psychology ===
Psychologists and sociologists have explored the individual and social psychology of anti-Black racism, often in reference to Fanon's work on negrophobia. Jock McCulloch explores Fanon's conception from a psychodynamic perspective, arguing that negrophobia requires psychological projection, and reveals "a certain psychic dependence of the European upon the black". He also points out that negrophobia, though it can be described as an emotional disorder, is theorised to come from the same "psychodynamic mechanism" as antisemitism, and stresses the importance, in Fanon's account, of negrophobia as inherently racist and a product of colonialism. Despite this, the description of negrophobia as an emotional disorder or involuntary reflex has been used as a legal defense to justify violent crimes against Black people, including murder, as a form of self-defense or involuntary reaction.

=== Internalised racism ===
Psychiatrist Frantz Fanon introduced the concept of internalised racism, or internalised negrophobia, pointing to the hatred of Black people and Black culture by Black people themselves. He asserts that anti-Black sentiment is a form of "trauma for white people of the Negro". Equivalent to internalised racism caused by the trauma of living in a culture defining Black people as inherently evil, Fanon emphasises the slight existing cultural intricacies caused by the vast diversity of Black people and cultures, as well as the nature of their colonisation by White Europeans. The symptoms of such internalised anti-Black sentiment include a rejection of their native or ethnic language in favour of European languages, a marked preference for European cultures over Black cultures, and a tendency to surround themselves with lighter-skinned people rather than darker-skinned ones.

Similarly, the pattern further includes attributing negative characteristics to Black people, culture, and things. Toni Morrison's novel The Bluest Eye (1970) stands as an illustrative work on the destroying effects of anti-Black sentiment among the Black community on themselves. The main character, Pecola Breedlove, through her non-reconciliation with her Black identity, her Black societal indifference, and her craving for symbolic blue eyes, presents all the signs of an internalised anti-Black sentiment. She develops an anti-Black neurosis due to her feeling of non-existence both within the White and her own community.

While the latter theoretical framework is academically debated, Fanon insists on the nature of anti-Black sentiment as a socio-diagnosis, thus characterising not individuals but rather entire societies and their patterns. Fanon thereby implies that anti-Black sentiment is a cross-disciplinary area of research, justifying that its analysis and understanding may not be confined to the psychological field.

=== Involuntary racism ===
In the book Negrophobia and Reasonable Racism, legal scholar Jody David Armour describes the term Involuntary Negrophobia as the legal precedent of defendants using a victim's Blackness as justification for violent crimes against them. Typically, such arguments rest on the idea that racist revulsion and violence directed at Black people is an involuntary reaction (such as with PTSD) and thus not an intentional criminal act, or that it constitutes a form of self-defence based on their perception of the victim as a threat because of their Blackness. This approach focusses on the personal culpability of the individual defendant, and their state of mind. Armour critiques this view as equating anti-Black sentiment with insanity and allowing a person's racial fear to legally justify and even excuse violent behaviour.

=== Education and business ===
In response to Black Lives Matter organising contemporary scholars have begun focusing on anti-Blackness in educational institutions and places of business. These efforts build on established critical race discourses in their respective fields and incorporate concepts from Afropessimism.

== Anti-Black racism globally ==
=== Africa ===
==== Mauritania ====
Slavery in Mauritania persists despite its abolition in 1980 and mostly affects the descendants of black Africans abducted into slavery who now live in Mauritania as "black Moors" or haratin and who partially still serve the "white Moors", or bidhan, as slaves. The practice of slavery in Mauritania is most dominant within the traditional upper class of the Moors. For centuries, the haratin lower class, mostly poor black Africans living in rural areas, have been considered natural slaves by these Moors. Social attitudes have changed among most urban Moors, but in rural areas, the ancient divide remains.

The ruling bidanes are descendants of the Sanhaja Berbers and Beni Ḥassān Arab tribes who emigrated to northwest Africa and present-day Western Sahara and Mauritania during the Middle Ages. Many descendants of the Beni Ḥassān tribes today still adhere to the supremacist ideology of their ancestors, which has caused the oppression, discrimination and even enslavement of other groups in Mauritania.

According to some estimates, as many as 600,000 black Mauritanians, or 20% of the population, are still enslaved, many of them used as bonded labour. Slavery in Mauritania was criminalized in August 2007.

==== South Africa ====
Racism in South Africa can be traced back to the earliest historical accounts of interactions between African, Asian, and European peoples along the coast of Southern Africa. It has existed throughout several centuries of the history of South Africa, dating back to the Dutch colonisation of Southern Africa, which started in 1652. Before universal suffrage was achieved in 1994, White South Africans, especially Afrikaners during the period of Apartheid, enjoyed various legally or socially sanctioned privileges and rights that were denied to the indigenous African peoples and to the immigrants and descendants of immigrants who had not originated from Europe. Examples of systematic racism over the course of South Africa's history include forced removals, racial inequality, racial segregation, uneven resource distribution, and disenfranchisement. Racial controversies and politics remain major phenomena in the country.

===== Cape Coloureds =====
Mixed-race people in South Africa are referred to as Coloureds or Cape Coloureds. This term includes individuals with a mixed-race descent that can include African, Asian, and European ethnic heritage. The term "Coloured" is considered neutral in South African society and is commonly used to refer to individuals who self-identify as such. However, in some Western countries, such as the United Kingdom and the United States, the term "Coloured" has a negative connotation and can be seen as derogatory because it was historically used as a means of categorising Black individuals and reinforcing racial hierarchies. The word persists as a neutral descriptor in the names of some older organizations, such as the National Association for the Advancement of Colored People (NAACP) in the United States.

The 1911 South African census played a significant role in shaping the country's racial identities. The enumeration process involved specific instructions for classifying individuals into different racial categories, and the category of "Coloured persons" was used to refer to all people of mixed race. This included various ethnicities, such as Khoikhoi, San, Cape Malays, Griquas, Korannas, Creoles, Negroes, and Cape Coloureds. What is particularly noteworthy about the classification of "Coloured persons" is that it included individuals of Black African descent, who were commonly known as Negroes. As a result, Coloureds or Cape Coloureds, as a group of mixed-race descent individuals, also have Black African ancestry and can be considered part of the broader African diaspora.

The racial category of Coloureds is a multifaceted and heterogeneous group that exhibits great diversity. Analogously, they can be compared to Black Americans, whose population is composed of approximately 75% West African and 25% Northern European ancestry. However, the Cape Coloureds possess an even greater level of complexity due to the presence of Bantu ancestry in their genetic makeup, which is closely linked to the predominantly West African heritage of Black Americans.

While Coloureds in South Africa do have Black African ancestry, it is important to recognize that they have a distinct identity and experiences that differ from those of Black South Africans. Despite this, there are instances where Coloureds may face discrimination and prejudice based on their mixed-race descent and Black African ancestry. Furthermore, some individuals who hold prejudiced attitudes towards Black people may also hold negative attitudes towards Coloureds, viewing them as inferior or less desirable due to their mixed-race heritage.

=== Asia ===
==== China ====
According to historian Yinghong Cheng, "a relationship between two racially superior/inferior human groups is either implied or demonstrated" in Chinese narratives and discourses toward Africans. Academic Mingwei Huang contends that Han racial nationalism contains "latent antiblackness." Reports of racial discrimination against Africans in China have been published by foreign media outlets since the 1970s. Publicized incidents of discrimination against Africans have included the Nanjing anti-African protests in 1988 and a 1989 student-led protest in Beijing in response to an African dating a Chinese person. Police action against Africans in Guangzhou has also been reported as discriminatory. In 2009, accusations which were made by Chinese media in which it stated that the number of African undocumented immigrants who were residing in China could be as high as 200,000 people sparked racist attacks against Africans and mixed African-Chinese people on the internet. In 2017, a museum exhibit in Wuhan was condemned for comparing Africans to wild animals and was pulled soon after amid outrage. In 2018, the CCTV New Year's Gala sparked controversies because it included blackface performances in which Africans were portrayed as submissive recipients of the support which they received from China. During the CCTV New Year's Gala in 2021, Chinese actors again put on blackface; the Chinese Foreign minister denied that the performance was racist.

According to BBC News, in 2020, many people in China have expressed solidarity with the Black Lives Matter movement. The George Floyd protests have reportedly sparked conversations about race that would have not otherwise occurred in the country, including treatment of China's own ethnic minorities. Observers have noted the apparent contradiction between the government's foreign policy toward Africa and its tolerance of racial hostility toward Africans on Chinese social media in an otherwise highly censored environment.

In the late 2010s, videos about Africans holding a written Chinese blackboard and chanting in Chinese went viral on Chinese social media. In February 2020, a video in which African children chanted, "I am a black devil and my IQ is low", was spread on Chinese social media. A group of BBC reporters traced the video's origin and created a documentary, Racism for Sale, on BBC Africa Eye, after Wode Maya expressed his fury at it. In the documentary, reporters revealed the video was made by a Chinese videographer located in Malawi. They also revealed abuses when creating videos and the videographers' racist attitude towards African people. After the documentary was released, pressure from Malawi was piling on the Malawian government. The videographer was later arrested and expelled from Malawi.

Racist content against Black people or representations of Black people is widespread on the internet in China. On Chinese social media, Black people are often framed as a demographic threat. Interracial relationships involving Africans result in virulent online criticism. According to academic Kun Huang, each time a mixed-race Chinese-African person has gone viral on social media, a nationalist backlash has ensued. In 2025, it was reported that AI-generated videos that contained racist stereotypes about Black people were spreading on Chinese social media platforms.

==== India ====
Incidents of violence against African students in North, South and West India are widespread with some being widely covered by local, national and international media. These include the murder of a 29 year old Congolese national, Masonda Ketada Olivier, in May 2016, who was beaten to death by 3 men in South Delhi over a fight about hiring an auto rickshaw. This incident triggered widespread condemnation from African students in India, the African Heads of Mission in New Delhi, along with local backlash against Indian minorities in the Congo.

In March 2015, four men from the Ivory Coast were assaulted by a mob in the city of Bangalore. In 2020, in Uttarakhand's Roorkee Institute of Technology, 2 African students, Ibrahim a Nigerian-Guinean and Benjamin a Ghanaian were attacked by a group of security guards, with Ibrahim being dragged from the second to the ground floor and Benjamin being hit by bamboo sticks. This incident led to the arrest of the Director of the institution along with 7 other individuals.

Following incidents of violence, the Delhi police in 2017 created a special helpline for Africans residing in the National Capital Region as part of their outreach program to assure them of their safety and security.

African students in North, South and West India are stereotyped as drug dealers, prostitutes, or even cannibals. In one incident in Greater Noida in 2017, the African students in the city faced violence and hostility following the death of Manish Khari, a class 12 student. The locals suspected the students of cannibalism and blamed them for his death, police arrested 5 students following local pressure, however released them subsequently as no evidence was found against them. The police had to request the students to stay indoors until their safety could be guaranteed and made arrests for the racial violence, however the local unit of the BJP and Hindu Yuva Vahini petitioned the police to stop making any further arrests among those booked for the incidents.

==== Japan ====
In recent history, the hike in the African-Japanese population has been linked to the American occupation of Japan following the end of World War II, where African-Japanese children were born through either prostitution or legally binding marriage. Thus, over the years, an increased number of African-American male/Japanese female unions has produced a culturally mixed African-American and Japanese population living in Japan. Once given preferential treatment during the American military presence in Japan, the currently biracial population faces some severe public backlash and marginalization due to the reemergence of ethnic-based nationalism in Japan. These unions between Asian women and American G.I.s have also contributed to the increase of the Afro-Asian orphan population. In some cases many Asian wives accompanied their husbands in returning to and settling in the United States. Subsequently, many African-Japanese are products of unions between Native Japanese and continental Africans due to the increased numbers of immigrant Africans.

==== South Korea ====
In 2006, American football player Hines Ward, who was born in Seoul to a South Korean mother and a black American father, became the first South Korean-born American to win the NFL Super Bowl's MVP award. This achievement threw him into the media spotlight in South Korea. When he traveled to South Korea for the first time, he raised unprecedented attention to the acceptance of "mixed-blood" children. He also donated US$1 million to establish the "Hines Ward Helping Hands Foundation", which the media called "a foundation to help mixed-race children like himself in South Korea, where they have suffered discrimination." Hines Ward was granted honorary South Korean citizenship.

=== Europe ===
In Europe, anti-Black sentiment finds its roots in the 17th century due to its extensive historical colonisation and slavery.

==== France ====
In 2005, an anti-negrophobia brigade (BAN) was created in France to protest against increasing numbers of targeted acts and occurrences of police violence against Black people. The latter protest movements notably underwent severe police violence in the Jardin du Luxembourg in Paris during the 2011 and 2013 abolition of slavery commemorations.

==== United Kingdom ====
Black immigrants who arrived in Britain from the Caribbean in the 1950s faced racism. For many Caribbean immigrants, their first experience of discrimination came when trying to find private accommodation. They were generally ineligible for council housing because only people who had been resident in the UK for a minimum of five years qualified for it. At the time, there was no anti-discrimination legislation to prevent landlords from refusing to accept black tenants. A survey undertaken in Birmingham in 1956 found that only 15 of a total of 1,000 white people surveyed would let a room to a black tenant. As a result, many black immigrants were forced to live in slum areas of cities, where the housing was of poor quality and there were problems of crime, violence and prostitution. One of the most notorious slum landlords was Peter Rachman, who owned around 100 properties in the Notting Hill area of London. Black tenants sometimes paid twice the rent of white tenants, and lived in conditions of extreme overcrowding.

Historian Winston James suggests that the experience of racism in Britain was a major factor in the development of a shared Caribbean identity amongst black immigrants from a range of different island and class backgrounds.

In the 1970s and 1980s, black people in Britain were the victims of racist violence perpetrated by far-right groups such as the National Front. During this period, it was also common for Black footballers to be subjected to racist chanting from crowd members.

Racism in Britain in general, including against black people, is considered to have declined over time. Academic Robert Ford demonstrates that social distance, measured using questions from the British Social Attitudes survey about whether people would mind having an ethnic minority boss or have a close relative marry an ethnic minority spouse, declined over the period 1983–1996. These declines were observed for attitudes towards Black and Asian ethnic minorities. Much of this change in attitudes happened in the 1990s. In the 1980s, opposition to interracial marriage were significant. Nevertheless, Ford says:

Racism and racial discrimination remain a part of everyday life for Britain's ethnic minorities. Black and Asian Britons...are less likely to be employed and are more likely to work in worse jobs, live in worse houses and suffer worse health than White Britons.

The University of Maryland's Minorities at Risk (MAR) project noted in 2006 that while African-Caribbeans in the United Kingdom no longer face formal discrimination, they continue to be under-represented in politics, and to face discriminatory barriers in access to housing and in employment practices. The project also says that the British school system "has been indicted on numerous occasions for racism, and for undermining the self-confidence of black children and maligning the culture of their parents". The MAR profile on African-Caribbeans in the United Kingdom suggests "growing 'black on black' violence between people from the Caribbean and immigrants from Africa". Martin Hewitt of the Metropolitan Police has said that murders using knives are given insufficient public attention because most victims are black people from London.

A 2014 study by the Black Training and Enterprise Group (BTEG), funded by Trust for London, explored the views of young Black males in London on why their demographic have a higher unemployment rate than any other group of young people. According to participants, racism and negative stereotyping were the main reasons for their high unemployment rate. In 2021, 67% of Black 16 to 64-year-olds were employed, compared to 76% of White British and 69% of British Asians. The employment rate for Black 16 to 24-year-olds was 31%, compared to 56% of White British and 37% of British Asians. The median hourly pay for Black Britons in 2021 was amongst the lowest out of all ethnicity groups at £12.55, ahead of only British Pakistanis and Bangladeshis. In 2023, the Office for National Statistics published more granular analysis and found that UK-born black employees (£15.18) earned more than UK-born white employees (£14.26) in 2022, while non-UK born black employees earned less (£12.95). Overall, black employees had a median hourly pay of £13.53 in 2022.

A 2023 University of Cambridge survey which featured the largest sample of Black people in Britain found that 88% had reported racial discrimination at work, 79% believed the police unfairly targeted black people with stop and search powers and 80% definitely or somewhat agreed that racial discrimination was the biggest barrier to academic attainment for young Black students.

=== Middle East ===
==== Arab world ====
Anti-Black racism in the Arab world refers to prejudice and discrimination against Black people in Arab societies. It affects both Black citizens of Arab countries and migrants from sub-Saharan Africa, and has been documented in employment, education, public life, migration, and popular media. It can include racial slurs, social exclusion, segregation, and stereotyped portrayals such as blackface.

The history of anti-Black racism in the region has been associated with slavery and the trans-Saharan, Red Sea, and Indian Ocean slave trades, although racial attitudes and identities have varied across periods and societies. In the modern Arab world, discrimination against Black people has been reported in countries including Tunisia, Libya, Egypt, Algeria, Mauritania, Iraq, Yemen, and Sudan. Some countries have adopted laws against racial discrimination, including Tunisia in 2018, but legal protections and public recognition of anti-Black racism vary across the region.

==== Israel ====
In April 2012, the Swedish newspaper Svenska Dagbladet reported that tens of thousands of refugees and African migrant workers who have come to Israel in dangerous smuggling routes, live in southern Tel Aviv's Levinsky Park. SvD reported that some Africans in the park sleep on cardboard boxes under the stars, others crowd in dark hovels. Also was noted a situation with African refugees, such as Sudanese from Darfur, Eritreans, Ethiopians and other African nationalities, who stand in queue to the soup kitchen, organized by Israeli volunteers. The interior minister reportedly "wants everyone to be deported".

In May 2012, disgruntlement toward Africans and calls for deportation and "blacks out" in Tel Aviv boiled over into death threats, fire bombings, rioting, and property destruction. Protesters blamed immigrants for worsening crime and the local economy, some of protesters were seen throwing eggs at African immigrants

In March 2018, chief Sephardic Rabbi of Israel, Yitzhak Yosef, used the term Kushi to refer to black people, which has Talmudic origins but is a derogatory word for people of African descent in modern Hebrew. He also reportedly likened black people to monkeys.

==== Saudi Arabia ====
According to The World Factbook, around 10% of Saudi Arabia's population is of Afro-Asian descent. Most Afro-Asians living in Saudi Arabia are Afro-Arabs of African origin, who occasionally face discrimination due to their dark skin.

=== North America ===
==== Canada ====
In a 2013 survey of 80 countries by the World Values Survey, Canada ranked among the most racially tolerant societies in the world. Nevertheless, according to Statistics Canada's Ethnic Diversity Survey, released in September 2003, when asked about the five-year period from 1998 to 2002 nearly one-third (32 per cent) of respondents who identified as black reported that they had been subjected to some form of racial discrimination or unfair treatment "sometimes" or "often". Black Canadians face racism in both the public and private sectors of the Canadian economy. Both black Canadian men and women endure significant wage gaps compared to non-visible minority Canadians.

From the late 1970s to the early 1990s, a number of unarmed black Canadian men in Toronto were shot or killed by Toronto Police officers. In response, the Black Action Defence Committee (BADC) was founded in 1988. BADC's executive director, Dudley Laws, stated that Toronto had the "most murderous" police force in North America, and that police bias against blacks in Toronto was worse than in Los Angeles. In 1990, BADC was primarily responsible for the creation of Ontario's Special Investigations Unit, which investigates police misconduct. Since the early 1990s, the relationship between Toronto Police and the city's black community has improved; in 2015, Mark Saunders became the first black police chief in the city's history. Carding remained an issue as of 2016; restrictions against arbitrary carding came into effect in Ontario in 2017.

Throughout the years, high-profile cases of racism against black Canadians have occurred in Nova Scotia. The province continues to champion human rights and battle against racism, in part by an annual march to end racism against people of African descent.

Black ice hockey players in Canada have reported being victims of racism.

==== Dominican Republic ====
Racism in the Dominican Republic has played a major role in the construction of Dominican government, culture, and identity. Since colonization, the Dominican Republic has negotiated the construction of racial hierarchies. The nation's historically fraught relationship with Haiti informed its Anti-Haitismo. Prejudice during the US occupation embedded racism in the structure of the state. Rafael Trujillo's authoritarian regime leveraged white Dominican identities in anti-black and Anti-Haitian rhetoric. These historical contexts laid the foundation for contemporary struggles with racism.

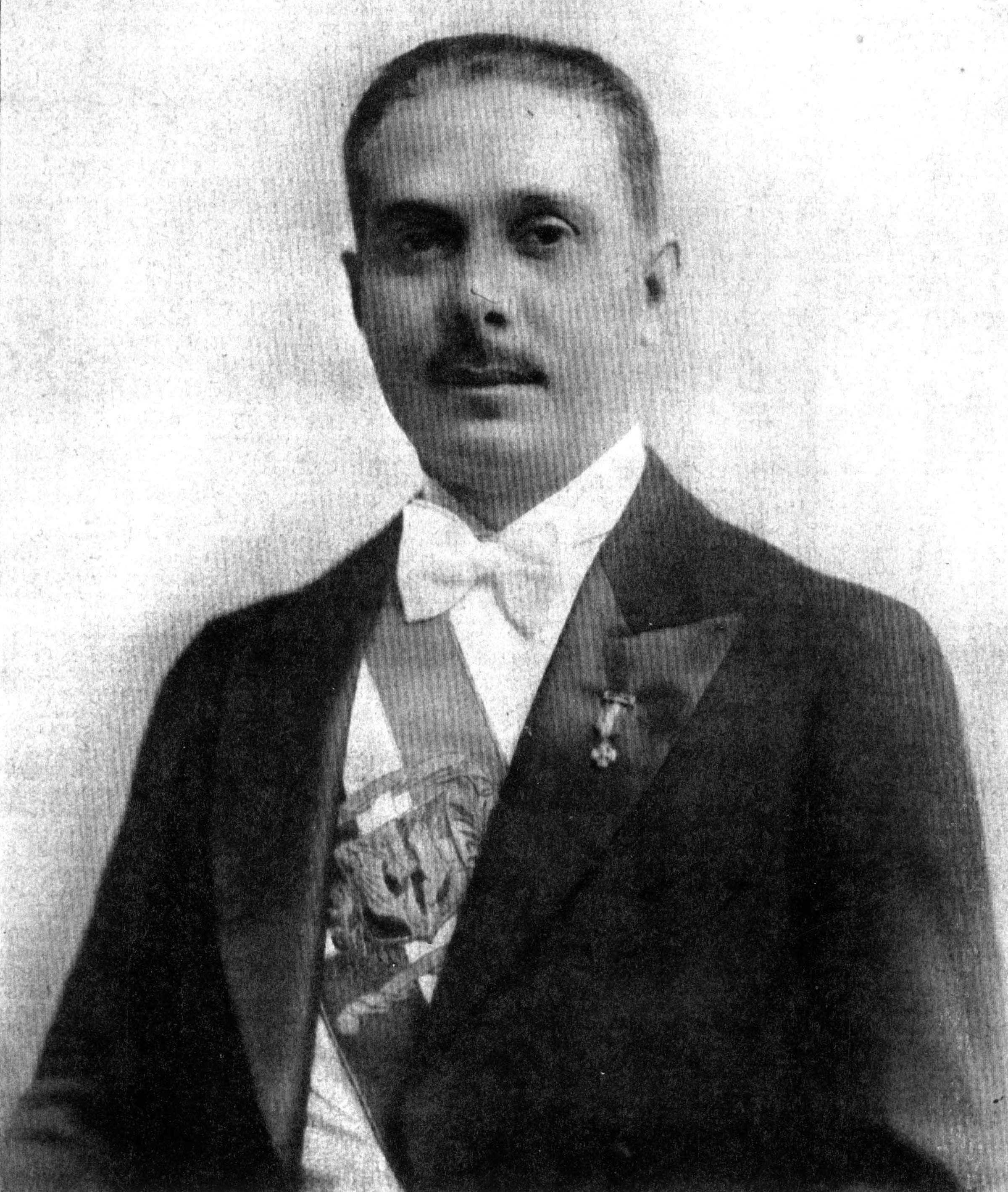
The Dominican dictator Rafael Leónidas Trujillo, who governed between 1930 and 1961, tenaciously promoted an anti-Haitian sentiment and used racial persecution and nationalistic fervor against Haitian migrants.

The contemporary Dominican Republic still contains policy with undertones of structural racism such as the 2013 court ruling which restricted citizenship for those of Haitian descent. The police and far right paramilitary groups such as the AOD also inflict violence on Black communities. A 2013 study concluded that the Dominican Republic was the second most racist country in the Americas. When individuals in the country were asked who they wouldn't want as neighbors, 15-20% responded those of "another race". Still, anti-racist and human rights groups, such as Amnesty International, fight for racial equality through tactics such as memory activism.

==== United States ====
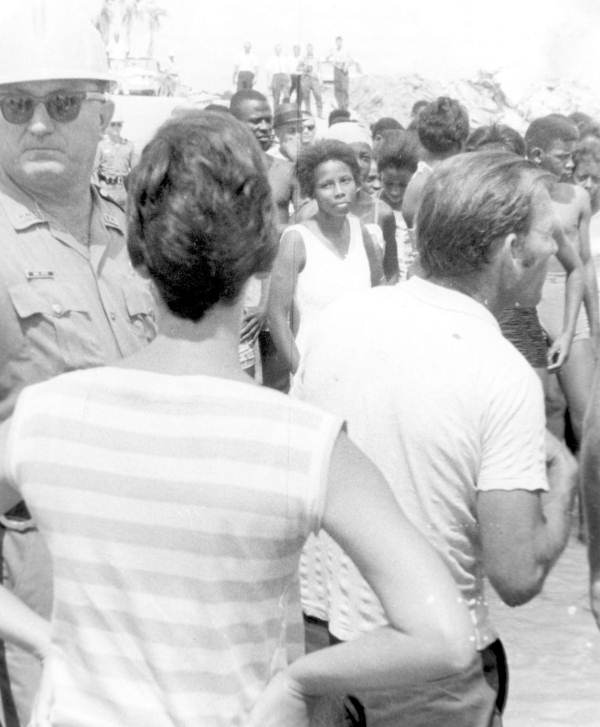
White segregationists (foreground) trying to prevent Black people from swimming at a "Whites only" beach in St. Augustine, Florida in 1964

In the context of racism in the United States, racism against African Americans dates back to the colonial era, and continues to be a persistent issue in American society in the 21st century.

From the arrival of the first Africans in early colonial times until after the American Civil War, most African Americans were enslaved by white people. Even free African Americans have faced restrictions on their political, social, and economic freedoms, being subjected to lynchings, segregation, Black Codes, Jim Crow laws, and other forms of discrimination, both before and after the Civil War. Thanks to the civil rights movement, formal racial discrimination was gradually outlawed by the federal government and came to be perceived as socially and morally unacceptable by large elements of American society. Despite this, racism against Black Americans remains in the U.S., as does socioeconomic inequality between black and white Americans. (Note: In his 2009 visit to the US, the [UN] Special Rapporteur on Racism noted that "Socio-economic indicators show that poverty, race and ethnicity continue to overlap in the United States. This reality is a direct legacy of the past, in particular, it is a direct legacy of slavery, segregation and the forcible resettlement of Native Americans, which was confronted by the United States during the civil rights movement. However, whereas the country managed to establish equal treatment and non-discrimination in its laws, it has yet to redress the socioeconomic consequences of the historical legacy of racism.") In 1863, two years prior to emancipation, Black people owned 0.5 percent of the national wealth, while in 2019 it is just over 1.5 percent.

In recent years research has uncovered extensive evidence of racial discrimination in various sectors of modern U.S. society, including the criminal justice system, businesses, the economy, housing, health care, the media, and politics. In the view of the United Nations and the US Human Rights Network, "discrimination in the United States permeates all aspects of life and extends to all communities of color."

=== Oceania ===
==== Australia ====
===== African Australians =====
As sub-Saharan Africans only began to migrate to Australia in larger numbers much later than sub-Saharan Africans were brought to the United States as slaves, and those who settled in parts of Europe, African Australian status is largely a new challenge for Australian authorities, and it is acknowledged that widespread racism against sub-Saharan Africans is not uncommon in Australia.

=== South America ===
==== Brazil ====
Many Brazilians still think that race impacts life in their country. A research article published in 2011 indicated that 63.7% of Brazilians believe that race interferes with the quality of life, 59% believe it makes a difference at work, and 68.3% in questions related to police justice. According to Ivanir dos Santos (the former Justice Ministry's specialist on race affairs), "There is a hierarchy of skin color: where blacks, mixed race and dark skinned people are expected to know their place in society." Although 54% of the population is black or has black ancestry, they represented only 24% of the 513 chosen representatives in the legislature as of 2018.

For many decades, discussions of inequality in Brazil largely ignored the disproportionate correlation between race and class. Under the racial democracy thesis, it was assumed that any disparity in wealth between white and non-white Brazilians was due to the legacy of slavery and broader issues of inequality and lack of economic mobility in the country. The general consensus was that the problem would fix itself given enough time. This hypothesis was examined in 1982 by sociologist José Pastore in his book Social Mobility in Brazil. In his book, Pastore examines the 1973 household survey and compares the income and occupations of father-son pairs. Based on his findings, he concluded that the level of economic mobility in Brazil should have been enough to overcome inequality left from slavery had opportunities been available equally.

Racial inequality is seen primarily through lower levels of education and income for non-whites than whites. Economic inequality is most dramatically seen in the near absence of non-whites from the upper levels of Brazil's income bracket. According to sociologist Edward Telles, whites are five times more likely to be earning in the highest income bracket (more than $2,000/month). Overall, The salary of Whites in Brazil are, on average, 46% over the salary of Blacks.

Additionally, racial discrimination in education is a well documented phenomenon in Brazil. Ellis Monk, Professor of sociology at Harvard University, found that one unit of darkness in a student's skin corresponds to a 26 percent lower chance of the student receiving more education as compared to lighter-skinned students. Further, a study on racial bias in teacher evaluations in Brazil found that Brazilian math teachers gave better grading assessments of white students than equally proficient and equivalently well-behaved black students.

Quality of Life Indicators vs. Race

Indicators	White Brazilian	Black & Multiracial Brazilian
Illiteracy	3.4%	7.4%
University degree	15.0%	4.7%
Life expectancy	76	73
Unemployment	6.8%	11.3%
Average annual income	R$37,188	R$21,168
Homicide deaths	29%	65.5%

== Racism against non-African descent Black people ==
Though anti-Black racism traditionally refers to people of Black African descent, there are other groups who are identified as Black and whose experiences of racism may share similarities to those of Black Africans. These groups include Indigenous Australians (Aboriginal Australians and Torres Strait Islanders) and Melanesians.

=== Indigenous Australians ===
Indigenous peoples of Australia, comprising Aboriginal peoples and Torres Strait Islanders, have lived in Australia for at least 65,000 years before the arrival of the First Fleet in 1788. The colonisation of Australia and development into a modern nation, saw explicit and implicit racial discrimination against Indigenous Australians.

Indigenous Australians continue to be subjected to racist government policy and community attitudes. Racist community attitudes towards Aboriginal people have been confirmed as continuing both by surveys of Indigenous Australians and self-disclosure of racist attitudes by non-Indigenous Australians.

Since 2007, government policy considered to be racist include the Northern Territory Intervention which failed to produce a single child abuse conviction, cashless welfare cards trialled almost exclusively in Aboriginal communities, the Community Development Program that has seen Indigenous participants fined at a substantially higher rate than non-Indigenous participants in equivalent work-for-the-dole schemes, and calls to shut down remote Indigenous communities despite the United Nations' Declaration on the Rights of Indigenous Peoples specifying governments must facilitate the rights of Indigenous people to live on traditional land.

In 2016, police raids and behaviour on Palm Island following a death in custody were found to have breached the Racial Discrimination Act 1975, with a record class action settlement of $30 million awarded to victims in May 2018. The raids were found by the court to be "racist" and "unnecessary, disproportionate" with police having "acted in these ways because they were dealing with an Aboriginal community."

=== Melanesians ===
==== Australia ====
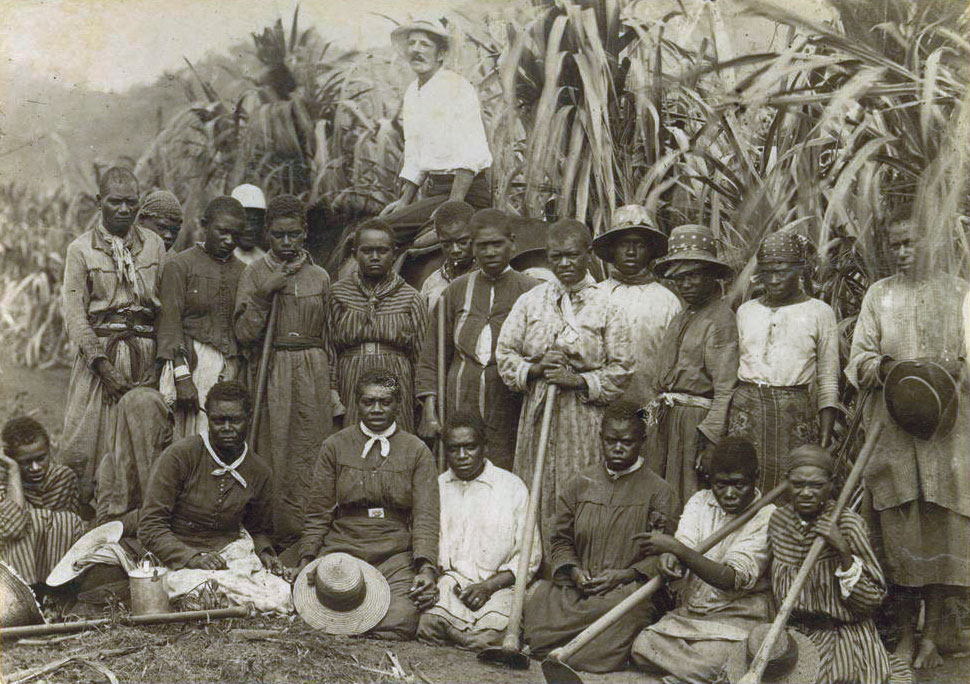
Kanaka workers in a sugar cane plantation, late 19th century

Tens of thousands of South Sea Islanders were forced, deceived or coerced into indentured servitude on Australia's agricultural plantations. The practice persisted despite slavery being outlawed in Australia and other parts of the British Empire by the Slavery Abolition Act 1833. This was known as blackbirding. The appalling conditions have been compared to slavery, or for Brooke Kroeger, slavery's 'just-as-evil twin'. This trade in what were then known as Kanakas was in operation from 1863 to 1908, a period of 45 years. Some 55,000 to 62,500 were brought to Australia, most being recruited or blackbirded from islands in Melanesia, such as the New Hebrides (now Vanuatu), the Solomon Islands and the islands around New Guinea.

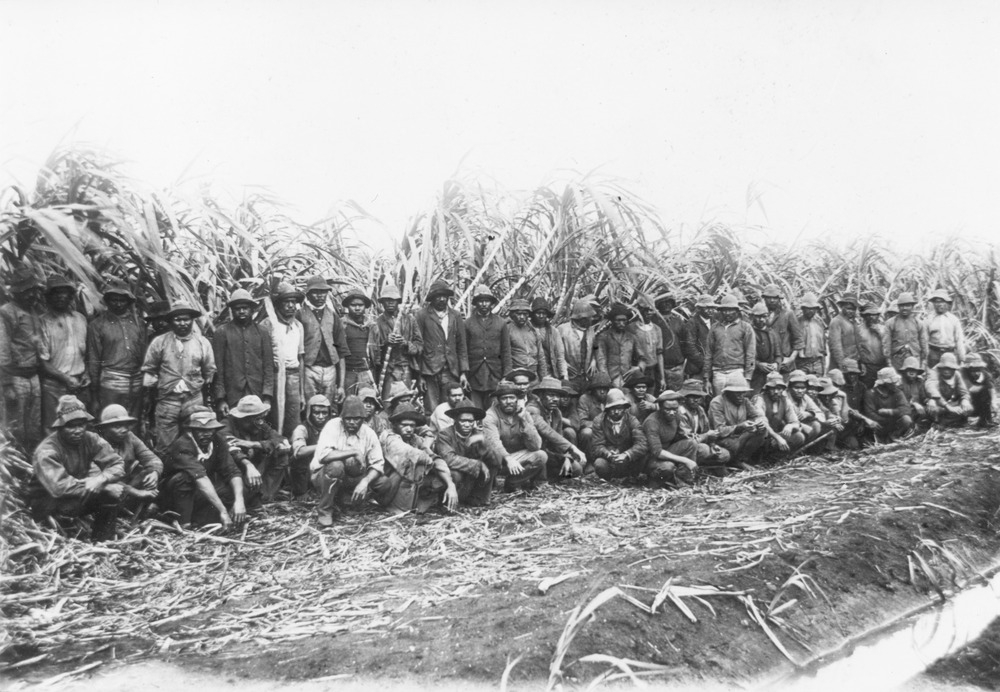
Blackbirded South Sea Islanders on a Sugarcane plantation in Queensland

The majority of those taken were male and around one quarter were under the age of sixteen. In total, approximately 15,000 South Sea Islanders (30%) died while labouring in Queensland – excluding those who died in transit or were killed in the recruitment process – mostly during three-year contracts. This is similar to the estimated 33% death rate among enslaved Africans in the first three years of arriving in America, Brazil, and the Caribbean; the conditions were often comparable to those of the Atlantic slave trade.

The trade was legally sanctioned and regulated under Queensland law, and prominent men such as Robert Towns made massive fortunes through blackbirding, helping to establish some of the major cities in Queensland today. Towns' agent claimed that blackbirded labourers were "savages who did not know the use of money" and therefore did not deserve cash wages.

Following Federation in 1901, the White Australia policy came into effect, which saw most foreign workers in Australia deported under the Pacific Island Labourers Act 1901, which saw the Pacific Islander population of the state decrease rapidly.

==== Indonesia ====
In the provinces of Papua and West Papua, the program has resulted in the Papuan population of Melanesian origin totalling less than the population of non-Melanesian (principally Austronesian) origin in several locations. According to Papuan independence activists, the Papuans have lived on the New Guinea island for an estimated 50,000 years, but have been outnumbered in less than 50 years by mostly Javanese Indonesians. They criticize the program as part of "an attempt to wipe out the West Papuans in a slow-motion genocide". There is open conflict between migrants, the state, and indigenous groups due to differences in culture—particularly in administration, and cultural topics such as nudity, food and sex. Religion is also a problem as Papuans are predominantly Christian or hold traditional tribal beliefs while the non-Papuan settlers are mostly Muslim. A number of Indonesians have taken Papuan children and sent them to Islamic religious schools.

The recorded population growth rates in Papua are exceptionally high due to migration.

Detractors of the program argue that considerable resources have been wasted in settling people who have not been able to move beyond subsistence level, with extensive damage to the environment and deracination of tribal people. However, very large scale American and Anglo-Australian strip mining contracts have been developed on the island, as well as other Indonesian islands.

The transmigration program in Papua was only formally halted by President Joko Widodo in June 2015, and remained like that in subsequent Prabowo Subianto presidency as laws made by previous Joko Widodo administration legally forbids transmigration of non-Papuans into Papua. However, remaining 10 transmigration areas previously built are still maintained and revitalized as new economics centers. Internalized Local Transmigration Program established by the Ministry of Transmigration, Central Papua Provincial Government, and Highland Papua Province Government to populate these provinces with Papuans from other populated Papuan provinces as those new provinces lacking population but have rich untapped natural resources of gold, coffee, and other agricultural and horticultural commodities.

== See also ==
- Anti-African sentiment
- White supremacy
- Anti-white racism
- Discrimination based on skin tone
- Nigger
- Negrophilia
- Racial bias in criminal news
- Racial hierarchy
- Racial profiling
- Racial segregation
- Racism against African Americans
- Xenophobia
- Black supremacy
