= Tess Asplund =

Swedish activist (born 1974)

Tess Asplund (born 1974) is a Swedish activist who gained attention following her protest against neo-Nazis in Borlänge, Sweden.

David Lagerlof photographed a viral image of Asplund, which showed her facing uniformed members of the Swedish Nordic Resistance Movement with her fist in the air.

== Life ==
She is originally from Colombia and describes herself as Afro-Swedish. About the incident, Asplund is quoted as having said “If this picture of me can get more people to dare to show resistance, then it’s all good...the people must unite and show that it is not okay that racism is becoming normalised and that fascists are running around on our streets.”

Asplund is a member of Afrophobia Focus.

Asplund was also quoted in Aftonbladet as a co-victim of a brutal assault with flagpoles carried out by three men of Polish origin following a populist right-wing demonstration in central Stockholm that the Polish men appeared to be part of.

In 2016 Asplund was included on the BBC's 100 Women list, alongside Alicia Keys, Ellinah Wamukoya and Nadiya Hussain. The theme for the year's list was defiance.

== See also ==
- 100 Women (BBC)
- The Woman with the Handbag
