= Akua Benjamin =

Canadian scholar

Akua Benjamin is a Canadian scholar and social worker at Toronto Metropolitan University. She is notable for defining the term anti-Black racism.

== Career ==
Benjamin was born in Trinidad, and migrated to Canada in 1969.

She began teaching at Toronto Metropolitan University, then called Ryerson University, in 1988. She is a Professor Emeritus and is the former Director of TMU’s School of Social Work, serving in the position from its creation in 2003 to 2008.

Benjamin defined the term anti-Black racism.

She co-founded the Anti-Black Racism Network, which raised awareness of racial profiling.

== Recognition ==
In 2005, Benjamin was one of 1000 women elected for the Nobel Peace Prize as part of PeaceWomen Across the Globe. In the same year, she was awarded the Inspirational Leader Award by the Ontario Association of Social Workers in 2005.

In 2016, Benjamin was an honoree into 100 Accomplished Black Canadian Women, being featured in their 2016 book.

In 2025, Benjamin was depicted in a Toronto Transit Commission bus with artwork by Shannia Lewis.

She is the namesake of the Akua Benjamin Legacy Project, which was established in 2016 by the Toronto Metropolitan University. In its inaugural year, the project released films highlighting six Black Canadian figures in history. The people depicted were Rosie Douglas, Dudley Laws, Charles Roach, Marlene Green, and wife and husband duo Gwen and Lenny Johnson.
