= African American Museum of the Arts =

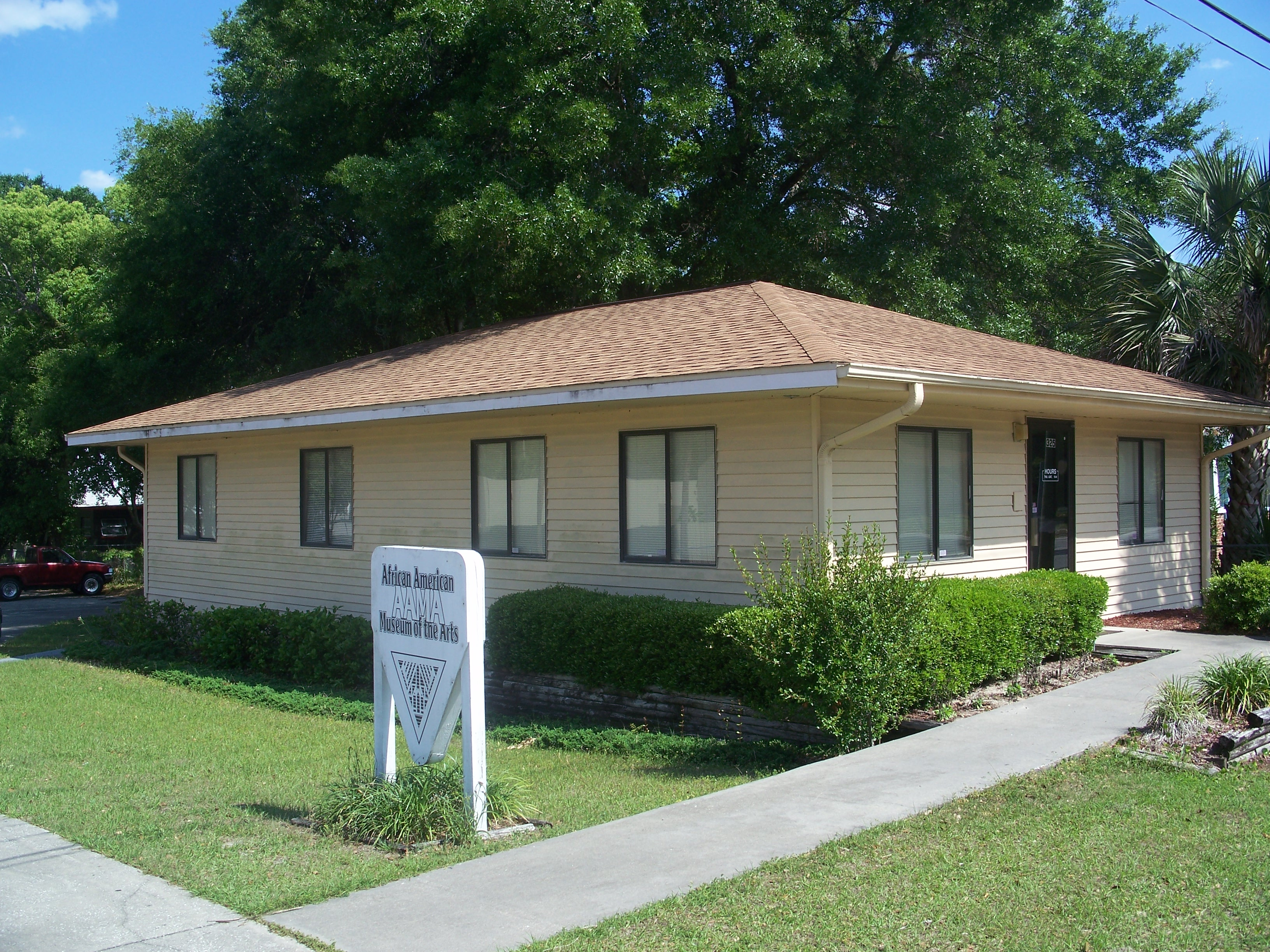

- Location within Volusia County
- Established: 1994
- Location: 325 South Clara Avenue; DeLand, Florida
- Coordinates: 29.02407°N 81.30694°W
- Type: History museum
- Website: www.africanmuseumdeland.org

The African American Museum of the Arts is an art museum, art gallery, and performance space located at 325 South Clara Avenue in DeLand, Florida. It contains a revolving display of art, and over 150 African-related artifacts.

The museum was the brainchild of Irene D. and Maxwell Johnson. After meeting with friends and community leaders, the two helped establish a board of directors on September 22, 1994. After two months of fundraising, the board leased a 1,200 square feet (110 m^{2}) space from the DeLand Housing Authority. This put the museum in the center of DeLand's African American neighborhood. The museum incorporated on January 10, 1995, and received its federal tax-exempt nonprofit status on May 3, 1995.

The museum opened its first exhibits on October 8, 1995. In addition to permanent displays of art and artifacts, the museum hosts temporary art exhibits and fine arts performances. It also provides meeting space for community groups and educational classes in the arts.

== Gallery ==
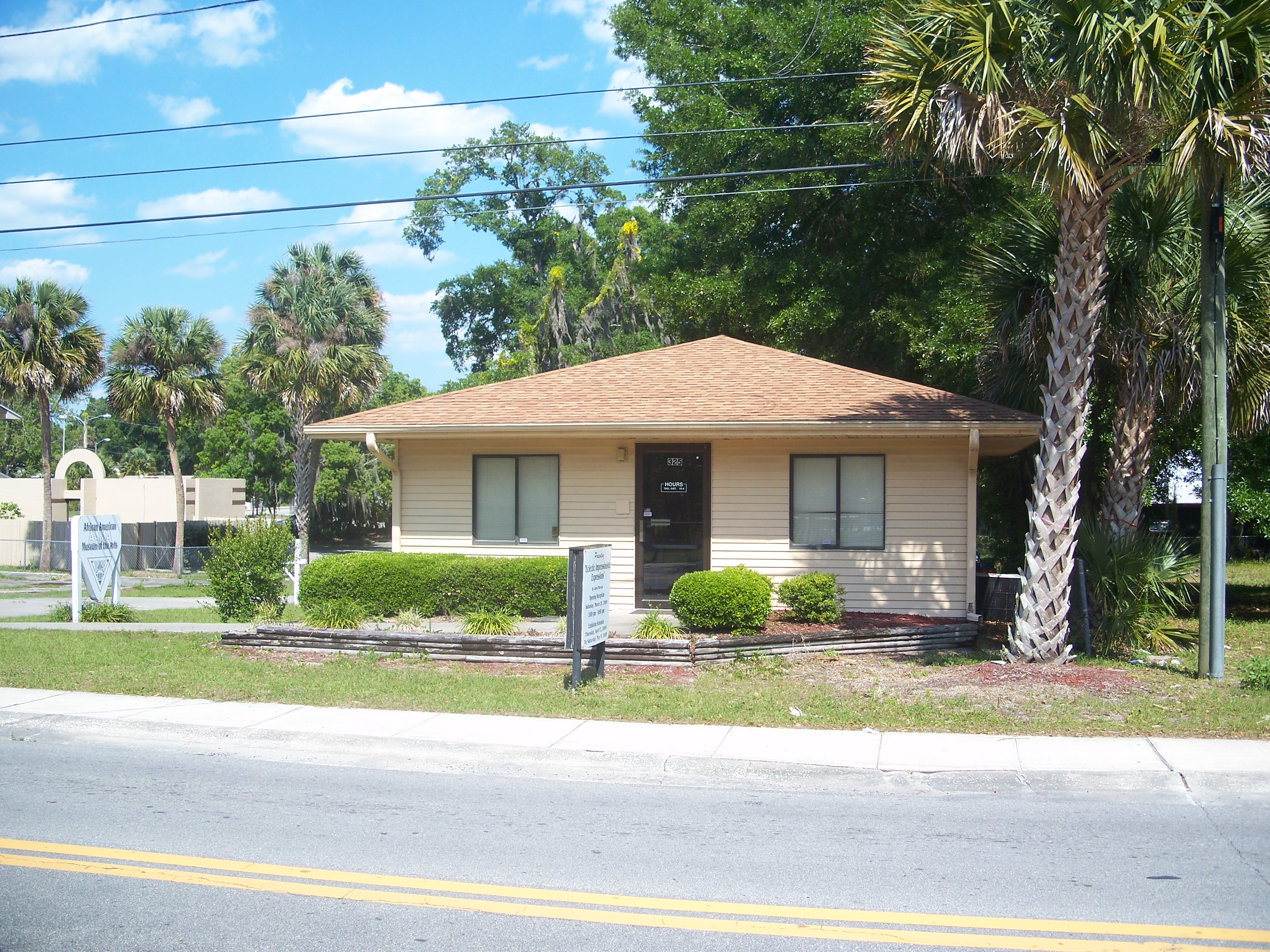

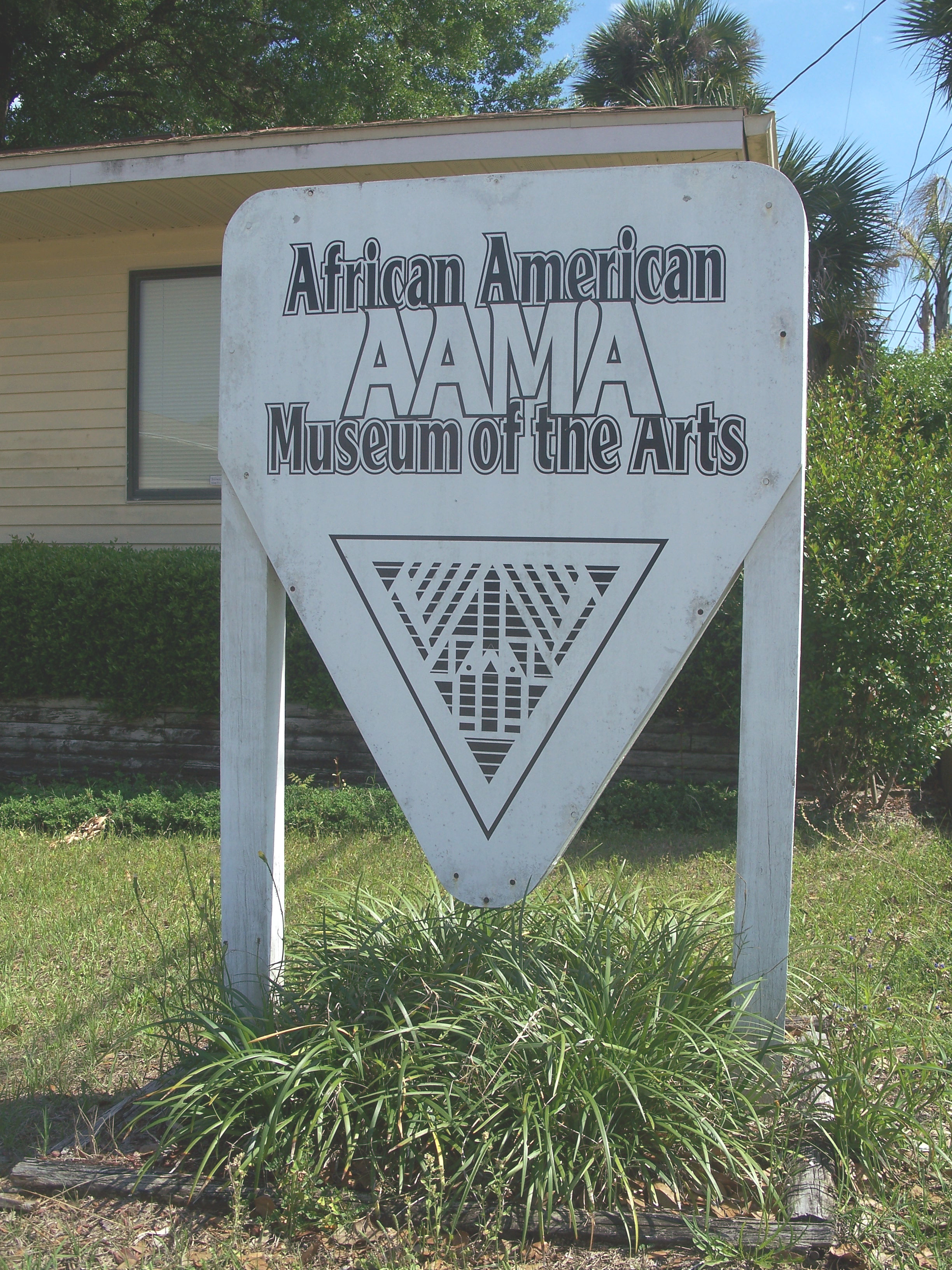
