= Marlene Green =

Canadian activist

- Born: Marlene Green; 9 November 1940; Dominica
- Died: 31 October 2002 (aged 61); Toronto, Ontario
- Occupations: community activist, educator, and NGO field worker

Marlene Green (November 9, 1940 – October 31, 2002) was a Canadian community activist, educator, and NGO field worker. She is best known as the founder of the Black Education Project, a volunteer-run organization created to address racial inequalities in Toronto's education system.

== Early life ==
Born in Dominica, Green immigrated to Canada in the late 1960s, a time period that saw 64 000 people from the Caribbean immigrate to Canada, following the liberalization of the Canadian Immigration Act.

== Activism ==
=== Toronto ===
In 1968, Green worked with black youth on social justice projects concerned with the liberation of South Africa. A year later, in 1969, Green started the Black Education Project, which advocated for black students and protested against disparities in the education system and discrimination in public life, the workplace, and policing. The program was Green's response to high dropout rates and the disproportionate number of black children identified as requiring special education and behavioural need classes. The Black Education Project encouraging “revolution by transformation but from the ground up.” Applying this approach, the organization promoted black history and offered support and educational resources to parents of black youth. It also provided educational programs, including after school programs, summer camps, and evening and weekend tutoring sessions.

Green's social justice work in the late 60s and early 70s involved socio-political movements. In 1969, Green raised funds for students involved in the Sir George Williams affair, an event part of the Black Power Movement in Montreal. In 1970, Green supported projects that contributed to the Black Power Revolution in Trinidad.

In the early 1970s, in addition to serving as a member of African liberation support committees, Green became the community relations officer for the Toronto Board of Education. In this position, she facilitated training programs and workshops focused on racism. In 1979, Green co-produced a report, the first of its kind, which identified problems, such as racially disproportionate educational outcomes that disadvantaged black students. In the 70s, Green also formed the Brotherhood Community Center Project, a space that was used by other social justice organization groups advocating for the needs of black Canadians.

=== International ===
Over the next two decades, Green worked internationally, participating in activities that opposed apartheid and concentrated on community development. She took on a leadership role at CUSO, serving as regional coordination of the international development organization. In this role, Green supported projects in east, southern, and central Africa as well as the Caribbean. She remained CUSO coordinator in Grenada until 1983. Green was evacuated from the island nation of Grenada, after it was invaded by the United States following the execution of Prime Minister Maurice Bishop.
