= Black culture =

Black culture can refer to:

- African-American culture
- Parts of the Culture of Africa
- Culture of parts of the African diaspora
- Blak culture, an identity used by some Indigenous Australians

== See also ==
- African American Museum (disambiguation)
- Dark culture
