= Hairstyling tool =

Hairdressing tool

Hairstyling tools may include hair irons (including flat and curling irons), hair dryers, hairbrushes (both flat and round), hair rollers, diffusers and various types of scissors.

Hair dressing might also include the use of product to add texture, shine, curl, volume or hold to a particular style.

== Types of hairstyling tools ==
Hair styling equipment which helps in creating hairstyles includes:

=== Hair irons ===
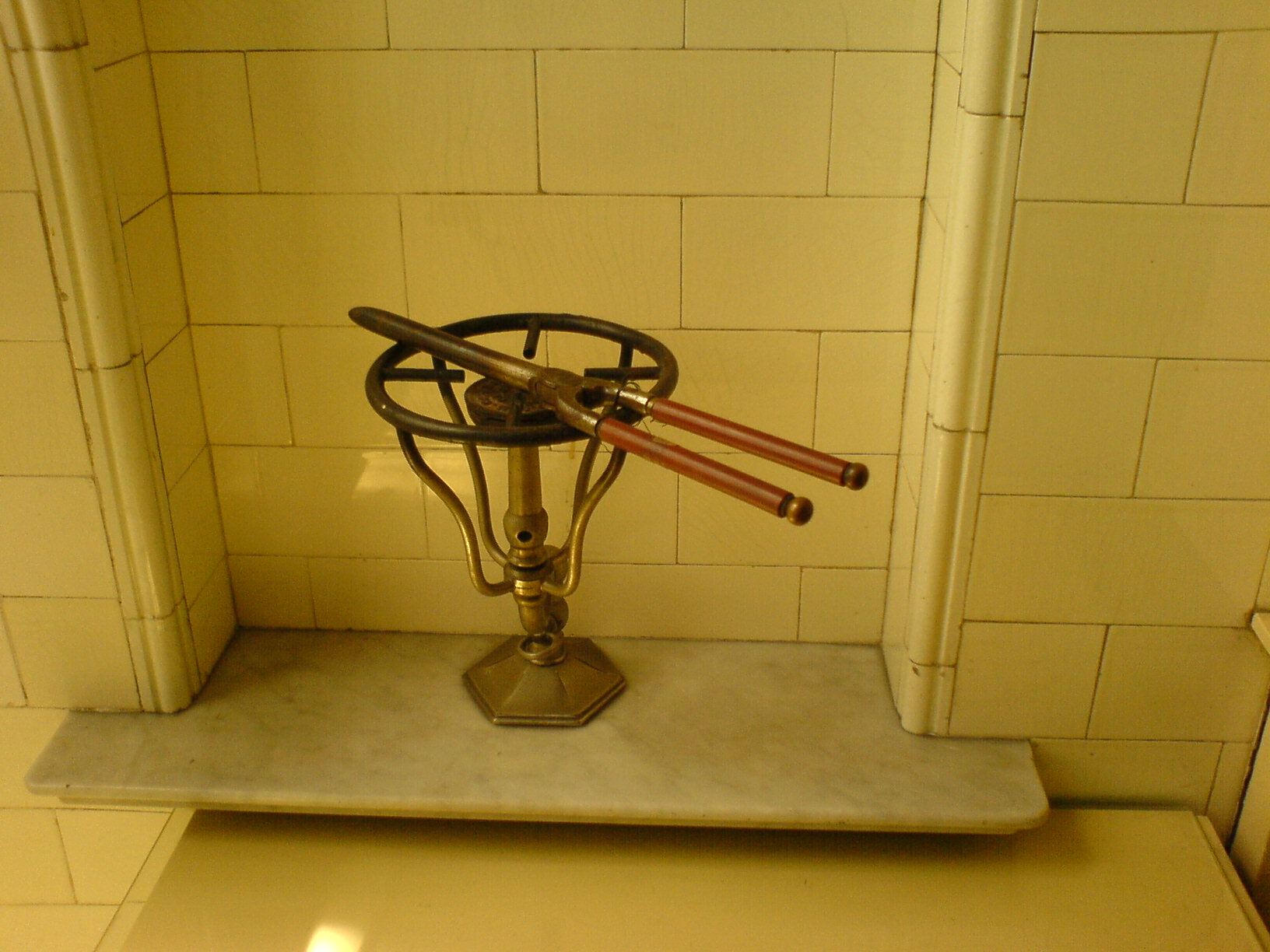
Early hair tongs

A hair iron is a tool used to change the structure of the hair with the help of heat. There are three general kinds: curling tongs, also known as curling irons, used to make the hair curly; straighteners, also known as flat irons, used to straighten the hair; and crimpers, used to create small crimps in the hair.

=== Hair dryers ===
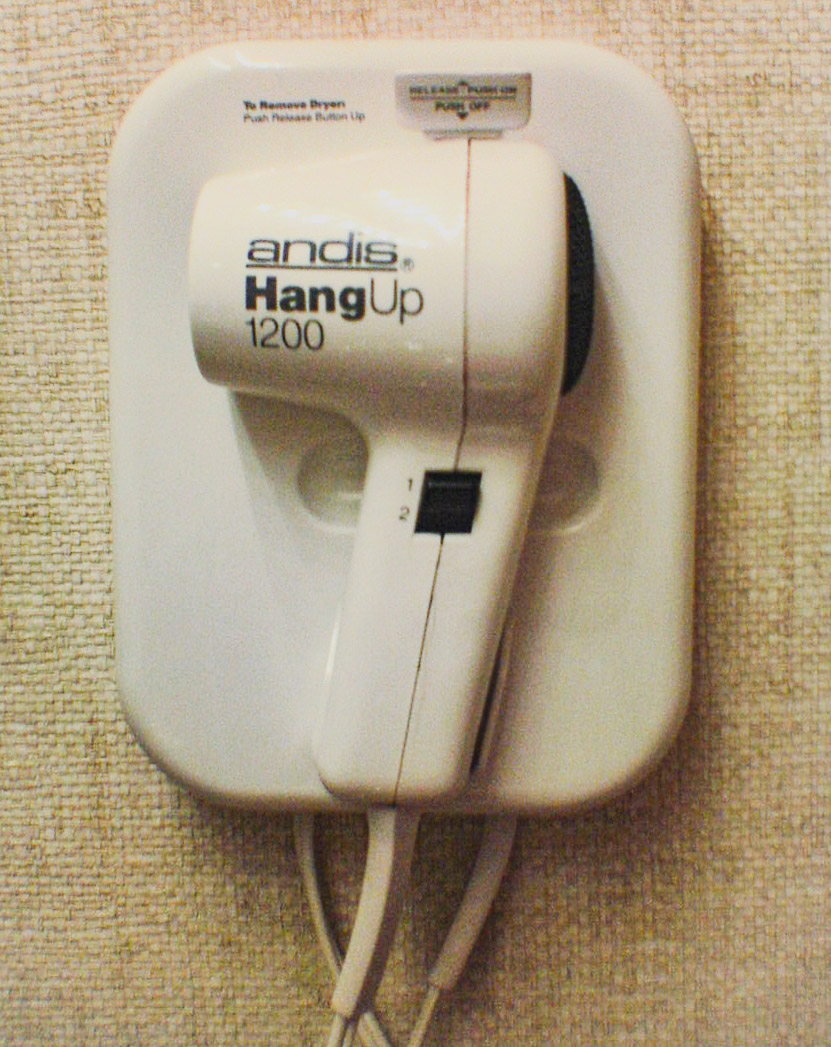
Modern-day blowdryer

A hand dryer, hairdryer, or blowdryer is an electromechanical device designed to blow cool or hot air over wet or damp hair, in order to accelerate the evaporation of water particles and dry the hair. Blowdryers allow to better control the shape and style of hair, by accelerating and controlling the formation of temporary hydrogen bonds inside each strand. These hydrogen bonds are very powerful (allowing for stronger hair shaping than even the sulfur bonds formed by permanent waving products), but are temporary and extremely vulnerable to humidity. They disappear with a single washing of the hair.

=== Hairbrushes ===
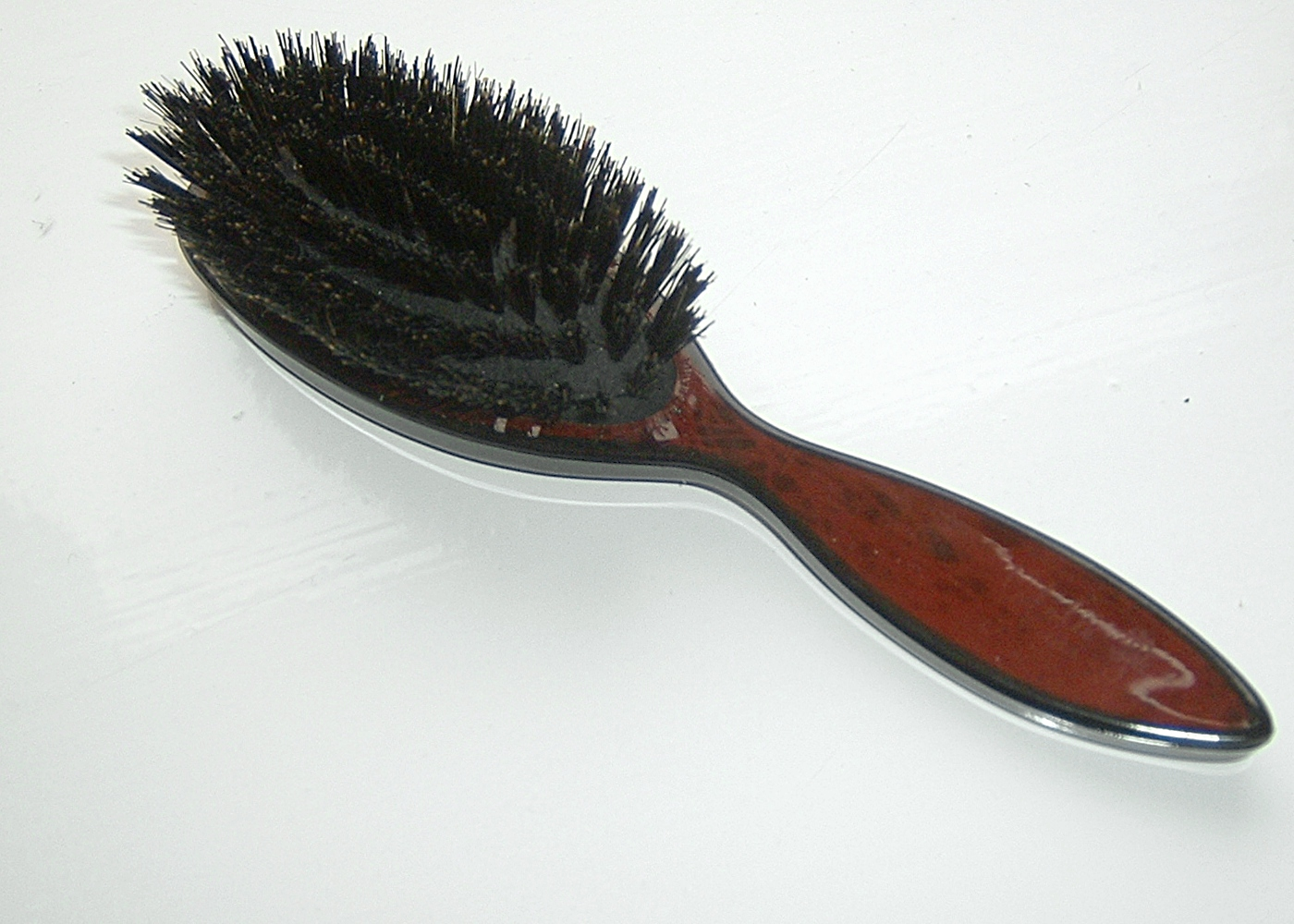
A flat hairbrush is used to detangle unkempt hair.

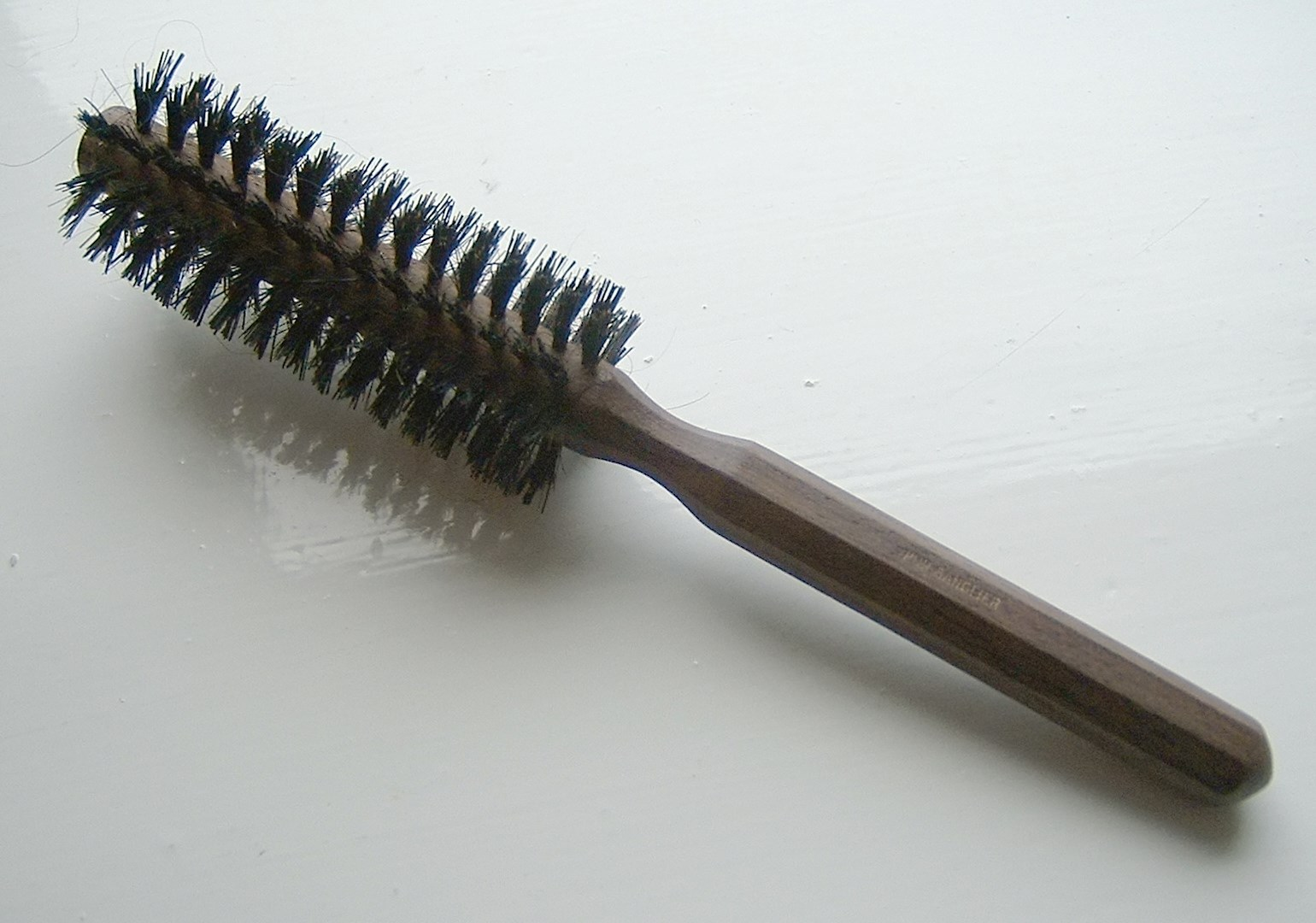
A round hairbrush is used to style hair for neat and tidy hair, medium length, with a blowdryer.

A brush is typically used on longer hair but can still be used for shorter hair, which is normally dealt with using a comb. A flat brush is normally used for detangling neat and tidy hair, after a sleep; a round brush for styling and curling hair, especially by a professional stylist, and with a blowdryer. A paddle brush is used to straighten hair, but not all work; they are usually used on untidy unkept hair. A hairbrush is also useful in removing loose hairs and in increasing circulation to the scalp.

The brushing of a domestic animal's fur, particularly cats and dogs, is often perceived as a mark of affection and/or a bonding experience, which can have a soothing effect, e.g. making a cat purr. It is also often necessary during shedding season, as is often recommended by veterinarians, particularly for animals with longer or thicker fur, to aid the animal in grooming and prevent the shed fur from covering surfaces in a household. In the case of cats - brushing is often done to prevent hairballs. Special brushes are made for cats and dogs. Brushes are often small and rectangular, with the width wider than the length, and an angled handle, designed for the ergonomics of a human brushing an animal which is below them, parallel to the ground, and or simply has a lot of surface area to be brushed. Varieties include a wire bristle brush, plastic or horsehair bristle brush, and small narrow toothed combs. For an equine's tougher hair, a curry-comb is used.

=== Scissors ===
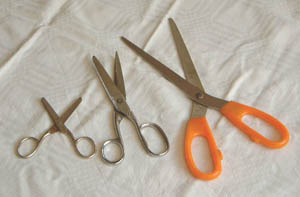
Different types of scissors - sewing (left), paper (middle), kitchen (right)

Scissors or shears are hand-operated cutting instruments. For people without hands, there is also the option of using a specially designed foot-operated style. They consist of a pair of metal blades connected in such a way that the blades meet and cut. Scissors are used for cutting various thin materials, such as paper, cardboard, metal foil, thin plastic, cloth, rope, and wire. Scissors can also be used to cut hair and food.

Scissors and shears exist in a wide variety of forms depending on their intended uses. Children's scissors, used only on paper, have dull blades to ensure safety. Scissors used to cut hair or fabric must be much sharper. The largest shears used to cut metal or to trim shrubs must have very strong, sharp blades.

Specialized scissors include sewing scissors, which often have one sharp point and one blunt point for intricate cutting of fabric, and nail scissors, which have curved blades for cutting fingernails and toenails.

Special kinds of shears include pinking shears, which have notched blades that cut cloth to give it a wavy edge, and thinning shears, which have teeth that thin hair rather than trim it.

=== Combs ===
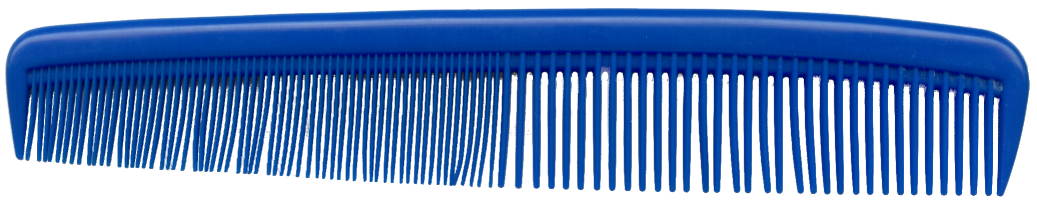
A comb

A comb is a device made of solid material, generally flat, always toothed, and is used in hair care for straightening and cleaning hair or other fibers. Combs are among the oldest tools found by archaeologists, having been discovered in very refined forms from settlements dating back to 5000 years ago in Persia.

=== Hair clippers ===
Electric hair clippers have gradually displaced manual hair clippers. Today, electric hair clippers are used by the vast majority of barbers in industrialized countries. All of these companies offer electric hair clippers in differing grades from bargain consumer units to high-end professional units. Most consumer grade clippers are intended for personal use by individual consumers and are often sold in kits which include several accessories such as clipper guides (for adjusting the length of the cut). Professional units are intended for hair care professionals and often are sold without any accessories (which must be ordered separately). The quality difference between the consumer grade and professional grade electric clippers has narrowed significantly over the years. Today the primary difference between the two grades is usually added or enhanced insulating for internal electrical components to prevent the unit from heating up during periods of prolonged usage. Some companies, such as Conair and Andis, replace some plastic parts in consumer grade units with metal parts on their professional grade units to extend the durability and useful lifespan of the product. Some companies, such as Wahl Clipper, produce specialty clippers, such as the Trim n Vac, which are designed for ease of use at home.

=== Hair rollers ===
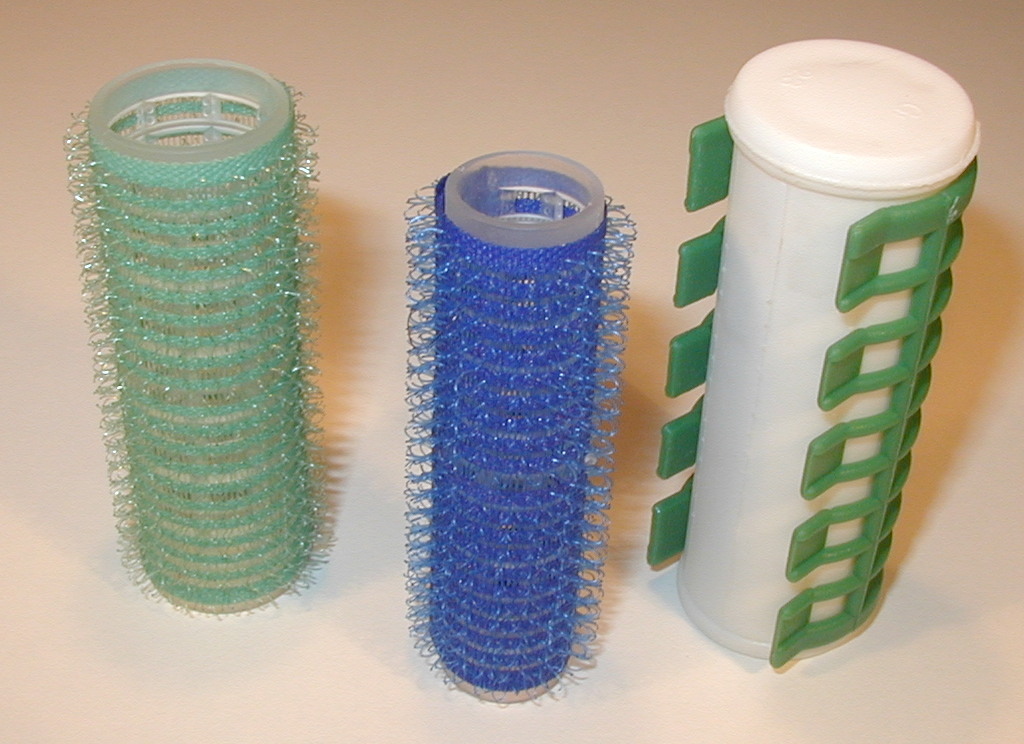
Hair rollers

Traditionally, a hair roller is a small roller with velcro used for styling and curling hair, and with a blowdryer. The damage that extensive heat application can cause to hair is well known however and so a number of alternative, heat-free hair rollers have been manufactured for the market.

=== Ribbon ===
A ribbon or riband is a thin band of flexible material, typically cloth but also plastic or sometimes metal, used for ribbon cuttingsilk, are often used in connection with dress, but also applied for innumerable useful, ornamental and symbolic purposes; cultures around the world use this device in their hair, around the body, or even as ornamentation on animals, buildings, and other areas. Ribbon is also sometimes used as a package sealer, on par with twine.

=== Hair elastics ===
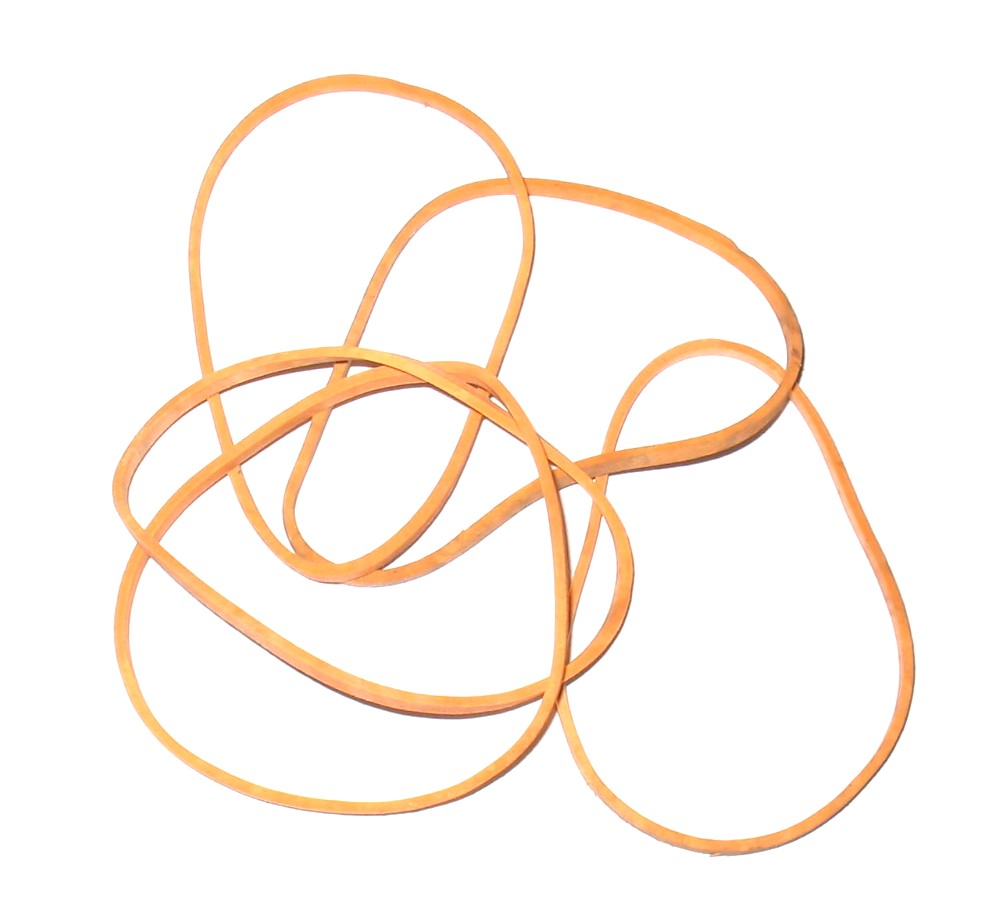
Five rubber bands

A rubber band (in some regions known as a binder, elastic band, lackey band, laggy band, lacka band or gumband) is a short length of rubber and latex formed in the shape of a loop. In the U.S. it is called a hair tie, and is often covered with fabric. Such bands are typically used to hold pony tails and braids together.

=== Kanzashi ===
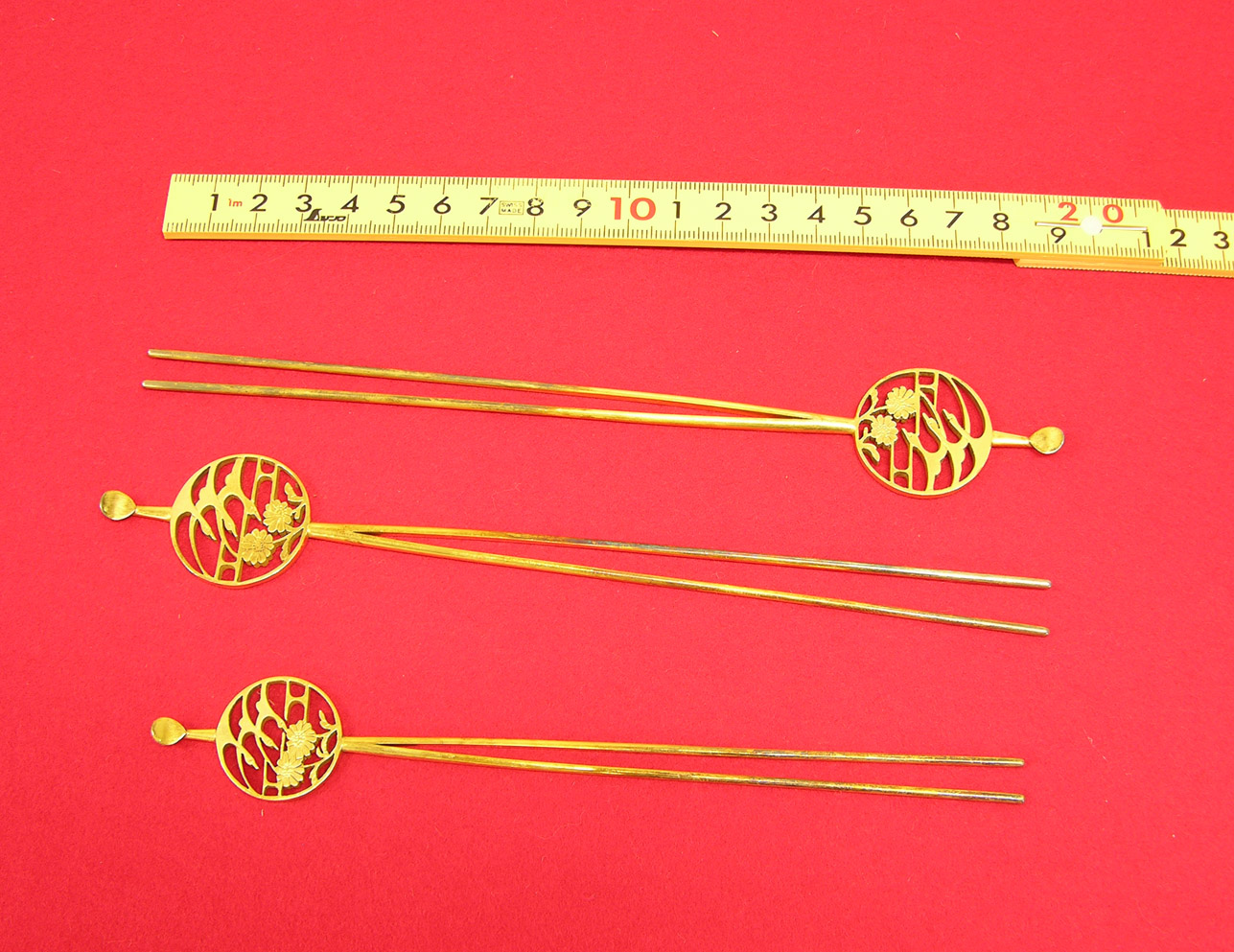
Gold plated brass kanzashi. Period unknown.

Kanzashi (簪) are hair ornaments used in traditional Japanese hairstyles. Kanzashi first appeared when women abandoned the traditional taregami hairstyle where the hair was kept straight and long, and adopted coiffured nihongami hairstyles. Kanzashi came into wide use during the Edo period when artisans began to produce more finely crafted products. Some believe they may also have been used for defence in an emergency.

Nowadays, kanzashi are most often worn by brides and professional kimono wearers such as geisha, tayu and yujo or adepts in Japanese tea ceremony and ikebana. However, there is currently a revival among young Japanese women who wish to add an elegant touch to their business suit.

Kanzashi are fabricated from a wide range of materials such as lacquered wood, gold and silver plated metal, tortoiseshell and silk, and recently, plastic. In fact, early bakelite kanzashi are extremely collectible.

There are many varieties and many styles of wearing them. The way in which a geisha wears her kanzashi indicates her status immediately to an informed audience; according to the type and location of the kanzashi. Maiko (apprentice geisha) usually wear more numerous and elaborate kanzashi than older geisha and progress through several hairstyles where the kanzashi must be worn in a fixed pattern.

=== Headband (Alice bands) ===
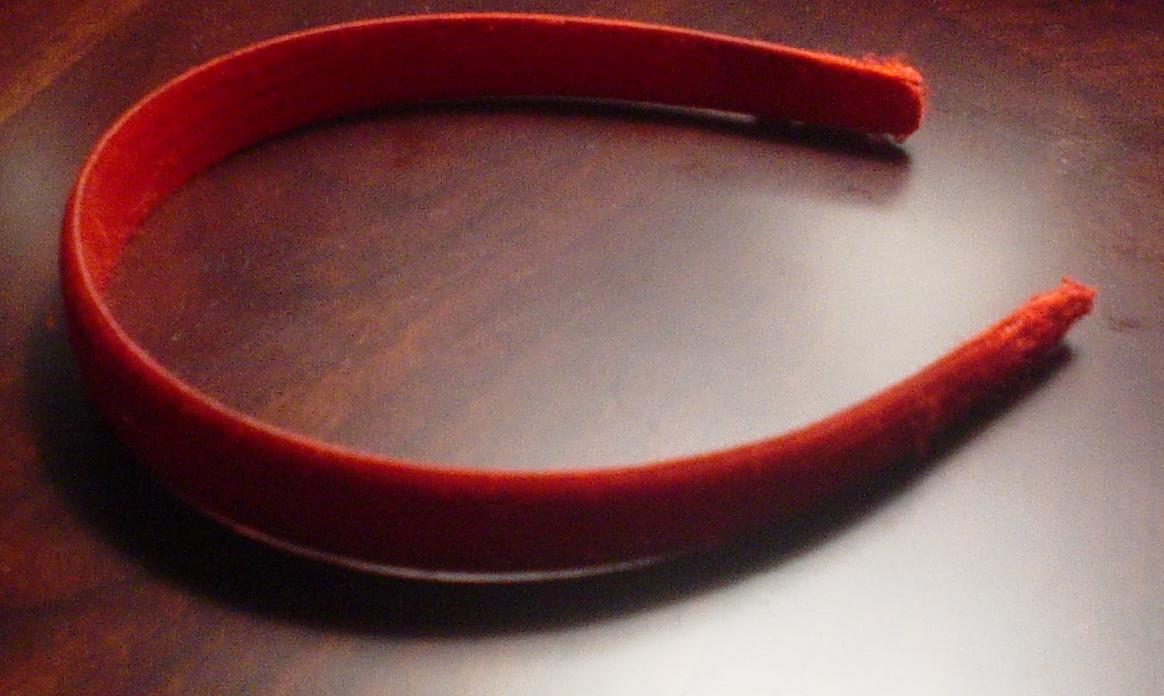
A hard plastic headband, or Alice band

A headband is a clothing accessory worn in the hair or around the forehead, usually to hold hair away from the face or eyes. Headbands generally consist of a loop of elastic material or a horseshoe-shaped piece of flexible plastic or metal. They come in assorted shapes and sizes and are used for both practical and fashion purposes.

Horseshoe-shaped headbands are sometimes called Alice bands after the headbands that Alice is often depicted wearing in Through the Looking-Glass.

=== Barrettes ===
A barrette (also called hair-slide in British English or a hair clip in Australian English) is a clasp or pin for holding hair in place.

Barrettes are worn according to size, with small ones at the front and large ones in the back. They are used to keep hair out of the eyes or secure hairstyles but can also be just ornamental.

=== Hairpins ===
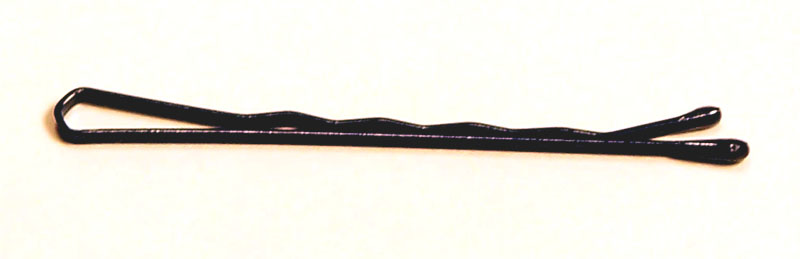
A bobby pin, a type of hairpin

A hair pin or hairpin is a long device used to hold a person's hair in place.

Hairpins made of metal, ivory, bronze, carved wood, etc. were used in ancient Assyria and Egypt for securing decorated hairstyles. Such hairpins suggest, as graves show, that many were luxury objects among the Egyptians and later the Greeks, Etruscans, and Romans. Major success came in 1901 with the invention of the spiral hairpin by New Zealand inventor Ernest Godward. This was a predecessor of the hair clip.

The hairpin may be needlelike and encrusted with jewels and ornaments. It often may be more utilitarian—designed to be almost invisible after being inserted into the hairstyle.

The jewels and ornaments on the hair pins add as a hair jewelry piece. In many cultures, hairpins are used with jewelry for many of occasions. For instance, in American culture, women predominantly use hairpins as a jewelry accessory at weddings, balls, and other major events.

Hairpins also may be constructed from different lengths of wire that are bent in half with a u-shaped end and a few kinks along the two opposite portions. The finished pin may vary from two to six inches in final length. The length of the wires enables placement in several styles of hairdos to hold the style in place. The kinks enable retaining the pin during normal movements.

== See also ==
- Hair care
- Hairstyle
- Hairstyling
