= French twist (hairstyle) =

Hair styling technique for proms and weddings

Actress Margot Robbie wearing her hair in a French twist at the 2026 Met Gala

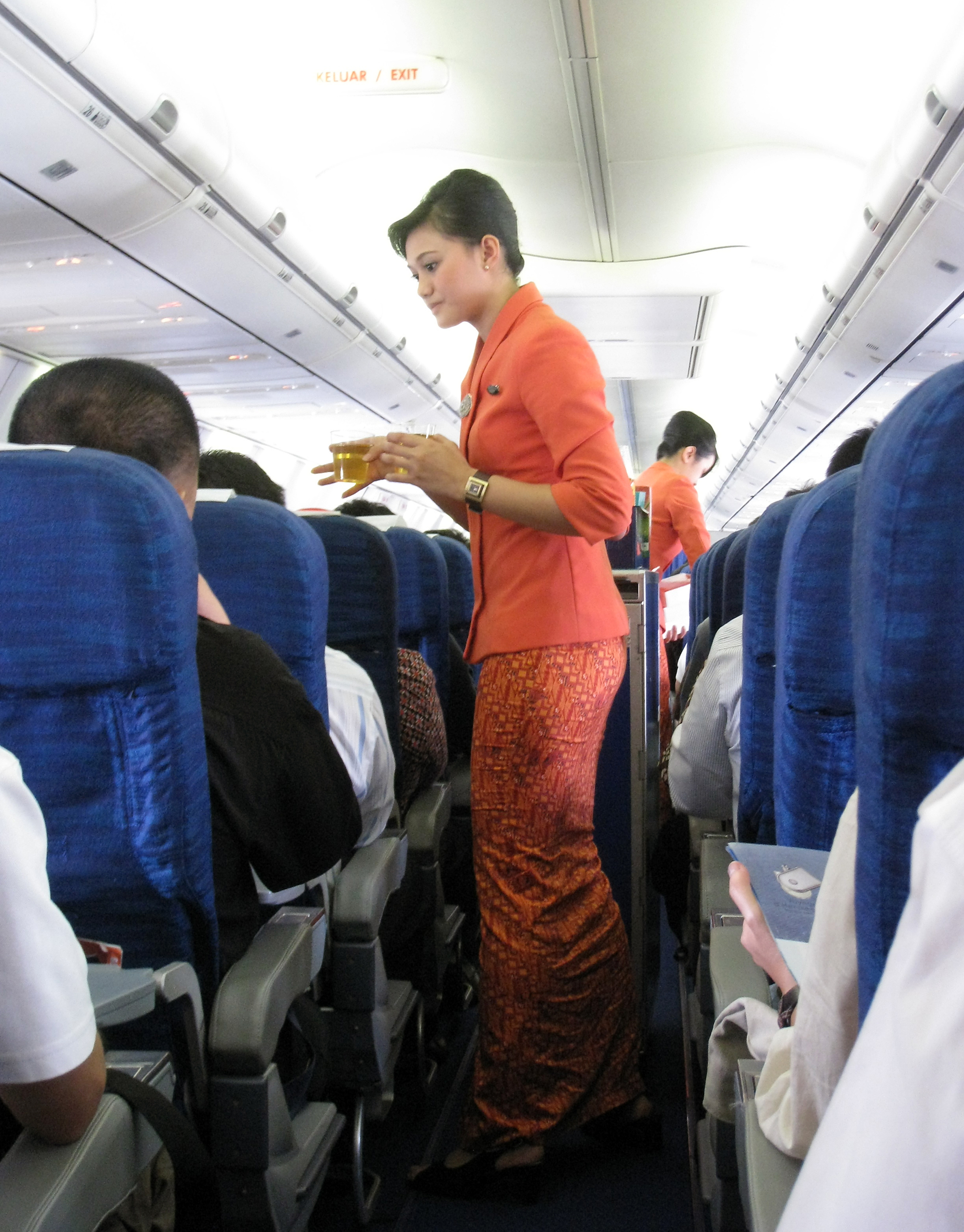
Flight attendants wearing their hair in French twists

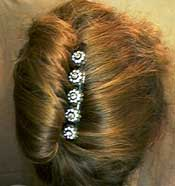
A French comb holding a French twist

A French twist, also known as a French roll, is a common updo hair styling technique. It is created by gathering the hair in one hand and twisting the hair upwards until it turns in on itself against the head. It is then secured with hair accessories.

French twists are usually worn to proms and weddings. Hair clips or French pins are also commonly used with French twists.

== History ==
The earliest known use of "French twist" to describe this hairstyle was in 1850, but the hairstyle itself may have originated in the 18th century.

The style gained popularity in the 1940s, often being associated with popular Hollywood actresses of the time, such as Grace Kelly and Audrey Hepburn. This popularity continued in following decades, and continues to be a staple in the fashion zeitgeist in the 2020s.

== Variations ==
Through the long history of the French twist, there have been many variations. While shorter hair can be fully contained in the twist, there are several ways to wear longer hair. Sometimes, the excess hair is wrapped into a bun at the top of the twist, or left free as curls or a low ponytail on the side or bottom of the twist.

French twists with higher bouffants are considered to be a retro look, while sleeker and tighter French twists with no freely hanging strands are considered more formal and even associated with the ballet.

Various accessories may be used to hold, or to embellish, the French twist. Barrettes, combs, hair sticks, hairpins (such as bobby pins and French pins) are commonly used to secure the style. Decorative items such as hair jewelry or flowers may be used to accessorize.

=== Regional ===
This hairstyle is popular in Japan as a formal updo. Locally, it is referred to as 夜会巻き, which translates to "party roll" or "night party roll" in English. It is routinely worn by flight attendants, bar hostesses and other hospitality staff, or paired with traditional attire such as kimono in formal or semi-formal settings.

== See also ==
- List of hairstyles
