= Plica neuropathica =

Medical condition for hair

- Other names: Plica polonica, bird's nest hair, felted hair, acute hair matting.
- Specialty: Dermatology

Plica neuropathica, also known as felted hair, is a curling, looping, intertwisting, and felting or matting of the hair in localized areas of the scalp.

== Signs and symptoms ==
Plica neuropathica appears as a compact mass of scalp hair that is twisted and irreversibly knotted, forming an impenetrable, firm to hard mass of keratin that is bonded together by exudates and debris.

== Causes ==
It is unknown exactly how plica neuropathica develops. Nonetheless, it has been linked to the longitudinal splitting or weathering of the hair shaft as a result of severe friction, repeated use of harsh shampoos and cleansers, and/or long hair neglected or maintained poorly. A few risk factors for this ailment that have been documented include the use of shampoos containing cationic detergents, secondary scalp infections, or infestations of the scalp.

== Treatment ==
The matted hair must be trimmed in order to treat plica neuropathica. Organic solvents can be used for manual separation in the early stages. Preventive hair care comprises routine hair washing with mild shampoos or cleansers, light combing and oiling to prevent matting, and routine hair cutting.
