= Ernest Godward =

British engineer (1869-1936)

Ernest Robert Godward (7 April 1869 – 2 December 1936) was an English born inventor and engineer who lived in New Zealand, England, and the United States. He created the spiral hairpin and a type of carburettor called a petrol economizer, which increased engine performance and reduced fuel consumption.

== Background ==
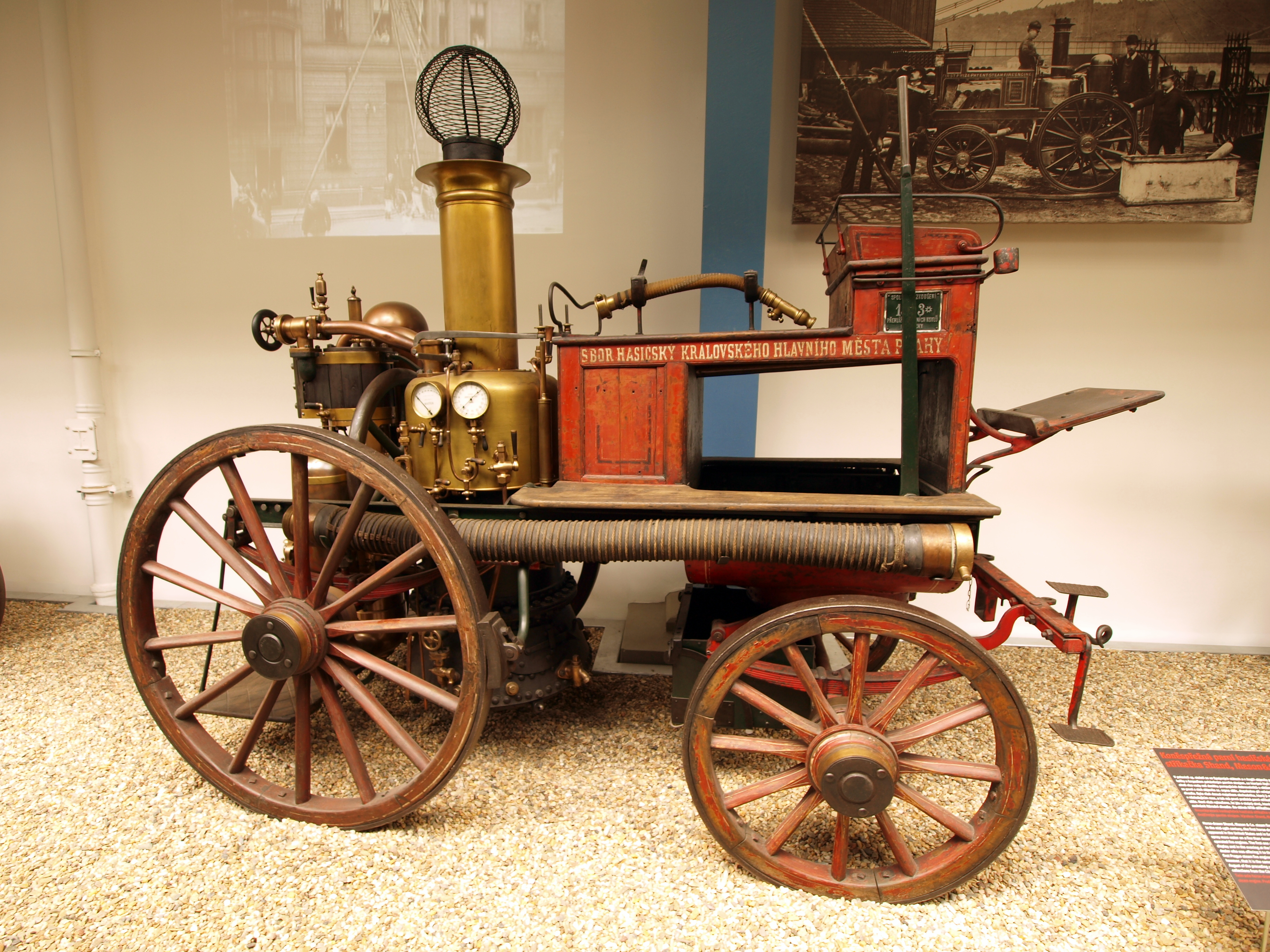
1882 Shand Mason and Co fire engine

Godward was born in Marylebone, London on 7 April 1869. He was the son of Henry Robert Godward, a fireman, and his wife, Sarah Ann Pattison.

When Godward was 12 he was sent to prep-school but ran away to sea reaching Japan where he worked on a cabling ship between Nagasaki and Vladivostok before he was returned home by the British Consul, Nicholas Hannen. On his return he was apprenticed to Shand, Mason and Co in London where he trained as a mechanic. Shand Mason were a firm of hydraulic engineers and steam powered fire engine manufacturers. Quitting Shand Mason he returned to the sea in 1884 as a ship's steward.

In 1886 Godward emigrated to New Zealand arriving at Port Chalmers aboard the 1310 ton Shaw, Savill & Albion Line sailing ship Nelson on 31 December. During his time in Dunedin he learned to play the banjo and formed a music group called the Star Variety Company. He worked in the cycle trade for Sam Stedman before shifting to Invercargill in 1893. There he became a partner in the Southland Cycle Works (later Godward and McKenzie) of Dee Street. Southland Cycle Works made Sparrowhawk cycles. On 28 January 1896 he married Marguerita Florence Celena Treweek and the couple had 10 children. Nine of their own plus a niece of Marguerita's.

== Inventions ==
Leaving the Southland Cycle Works in 1900 Godward embarked on inventing and manufacturing a wide range of everyday objects. Included among these were a non-slip egg-beater, in 1907, a new post-hole borer, a new type of hair curler, a burglar-proof window and a hedge trimmer made from bicycle parts. He founded the Godward Spiral Pin and New Inventions Co Ltd which was a listed company on the New Zealand stock exchange.

Major financial success came in 1901 with the invention of the spiral hairpin he had patented in 1899. Godward sold the American rights to the spiral hairpin for £20,000, which was a fortune at that time.

== Political career ==
From 1903 to 1906 Godward served on the North Invercargill Borough Council, painted portraits and landscapes, played a variety of musical instruments, sang in local musical productions, and in 1908 was involved in Southland's first hot air ballooning. He was a skilled sportsman: cycling for the Invercargill Cycle Club, running, swimming and one of the founders of the Invercargill Amateur Swimming Club in 1903, rowing, and boxing. In 1909 Godward together with Robert Murie won a motor race from Invercargill to Dunedin and back. A few weeks later a second race was run, with Godward and Murie crashing avoiding a dray. The race drew criticism from the Police, Automobile Association, and local Councils.

== Rockhaven ==
From 1905 to 1908 Godward built an impressive new house, Rockhaven at 397 Queens Drive, Invercargill. The house was designed by a relatively unknown architect, Peter Walker. The house is a significant example of Queen Anne style and carries a Category 2 Historic Place designation.

His wife lived in Rockhaven until 1946 when it was sold to Invercargill farmer Harold Smith. The Smith's owned the house until 1977. The house remains a private residence and the garage where Godward worked was still standing in 2013.

== Murder attempt ==
In 1908 Godward was a witness in the Coldstream shooting case. Maud Buchanan was accused of attempting to shoot Vera McKay. The Buchanans had been looking after the McKays' property while the McKays were in America. After the McKays returned, the Buchanans continued to reside at the property for a short time before returning to their own home. While they were at the McKays', Mrs Buchanan had had a falling out with Mrs McKay over a conversation that Mrs McKay had repeated to someone. After the Buchanans returned to their own home they began to receive anonymous letters which Mrs Buchanan considered were being sent by the McKays. Mrs Buchanan approached Mr McKay requesting he stop the letters and when he said he did not know where they were coming from Mrs Buchanan became upset.

Later the same day the Buchanans and Godward were leaving the Buchanans' home, Coldstream, by car to attend a concert. On finding the exit gate closed Godward got down from the car and went to open it. While doing that he heard two shots which he initially thought were the car backfiring. Turning he saw Mrs Buchanan with a revolver pointing at Mrs McKay. She fired another shot, hitting Mrs McKay in the arm, and then two more at Mr McKay before he overpowered her.

The later court case found that Mrs Buchanan did not intend to kill or injure, but merely to stop the anonymous letters by scaring the McKays. Mrs Buchanan was found not guilty.

== Economiser ==
Godward set up his own cycle business in 1908 and after a short time began importing Reo motor cars. He turned his attention to improving these and developed a carburettor in 1912 called the Eclipse Petrol Economiser. In 1913 he took his invention to London where he established the Godward Carburettor Company at Kingston upon Thames and patented the device in 1914. This venture proved less successful than he had hoped, so in 1916 Godward opened an office in New York, basing himself there.

In 1926 he developed an improved version of the carburettor named the Godward Vaporiser. The Vaporiser enabled motor vehicles to use fuel oil instead of petrol. The Mitten Company of Philadelphia, one of the largest public transport operators in the United States, adopted the invention. Some 580 buses and 3000 taxis were fitted with the vaporiser. It was said to increase horsepower by 15%.

The United States Army Transport section at Camp Holabird also successfully trialed the Vaporiser. In all Goddard created 72 different carburetors.

== Demise ==
Godward lost heavily financially in the stock market crash of 1929. He did make a partial recovery from these losses and during his later years in the United States was recognised as one of the world's leading authorities on internal combustion engines. Godward died of a heart attack on 2 December 1936 on board the SS Mongolia while returning home to Invercargill. He had won a skipping contest on board the day before.

According to his biography there was speculation that Godward had another family in the United States. The family related a story of an American woman arriving at Rockhaven some time after Godward's death to collect a Ming vase she said was promised her. She was turned away.

== See also ==
- History of the internal combustion engine

== Bibliography ==
- Walker, S (2013). Ernest R Godward Inventor. River Press, Dunedin.
- Walker, S (1998). Entry on Ernest Godward, Southern People, edited by Jane Thomson. Longacre Press.
- Strachan, S. R. "Godward, Ernest Robert 1869–1936". Dictionary of New Zealand Biography. Ministry for Culture and Heritage.
- Riley, B (1995). Kiwi Ingenuity: A Book of New Zealand Ideas and Inventions. AIT Press, Auckland
