= Bun (hairstyle) =

Type of hairstyle

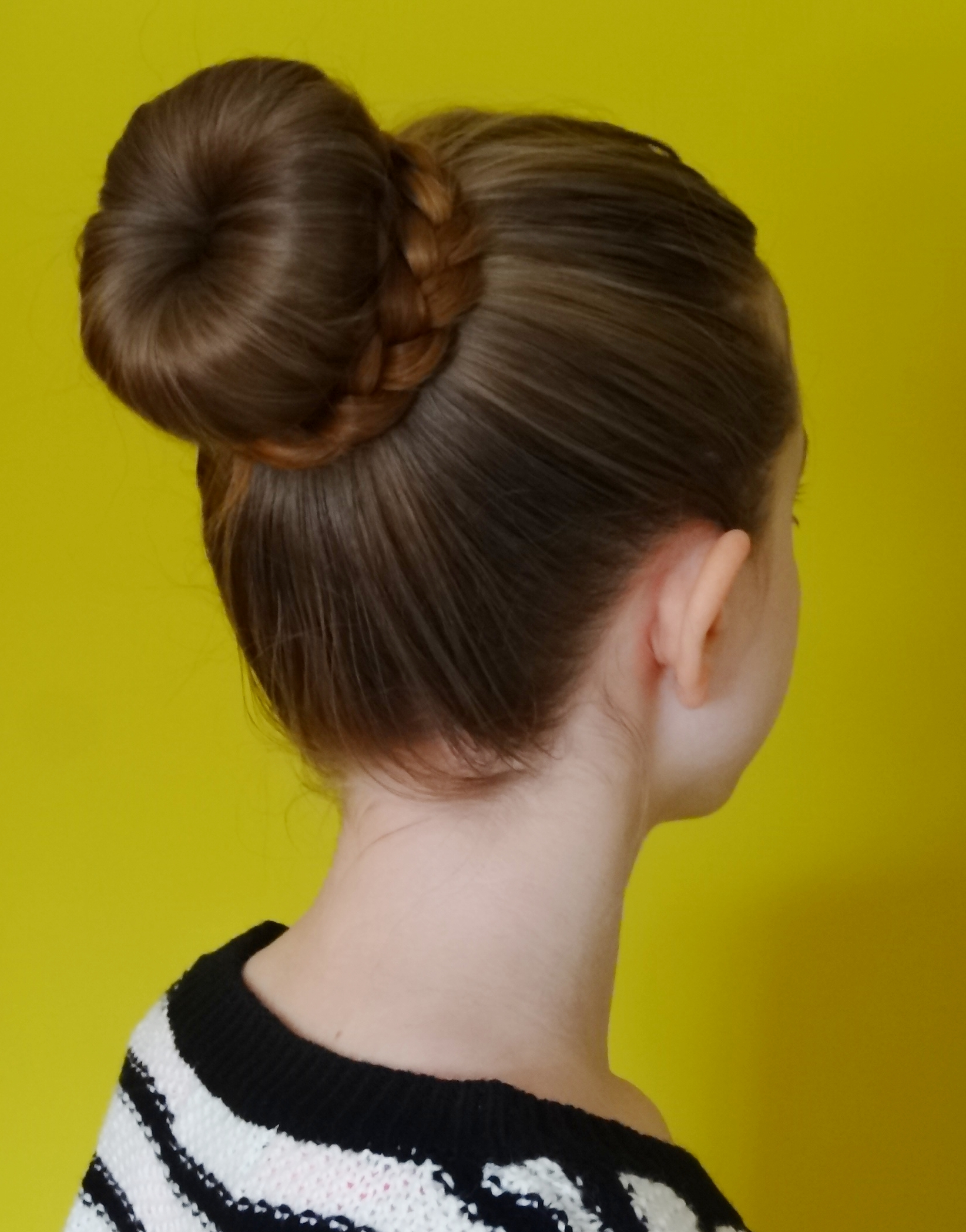
A donut bun with the base a half-finished donut bun; the loose hair that comes out of it (around the base of the bun) is plaited into a half or full Dutch braid; the end of the braid is wrapped around the bun and finally tucked under and hidden

A bun is a type of hairstyle in which the hair is pulled back from the face, twisted or plaited, and wrapped in a circular coil around itself, typically on top or back of the head or just above the neck. A bun can be secured with a hair tie, barrette, bobby pins, u-pins, hair forks, various types of hair clips, one or more hair sticks, a hairnet, or bun coverings. In place of hair sticks, objects of similar shape, such as pencils or paintbrushes, may be used. Hair may also be wrapped around a piece called a "rat". Various hair bun inserts may be used to create donut-shaped buns.

== Double bun ==
On the left is the "odango" hairstyle, and on the right is the "odango with pigtails" hairstyle.

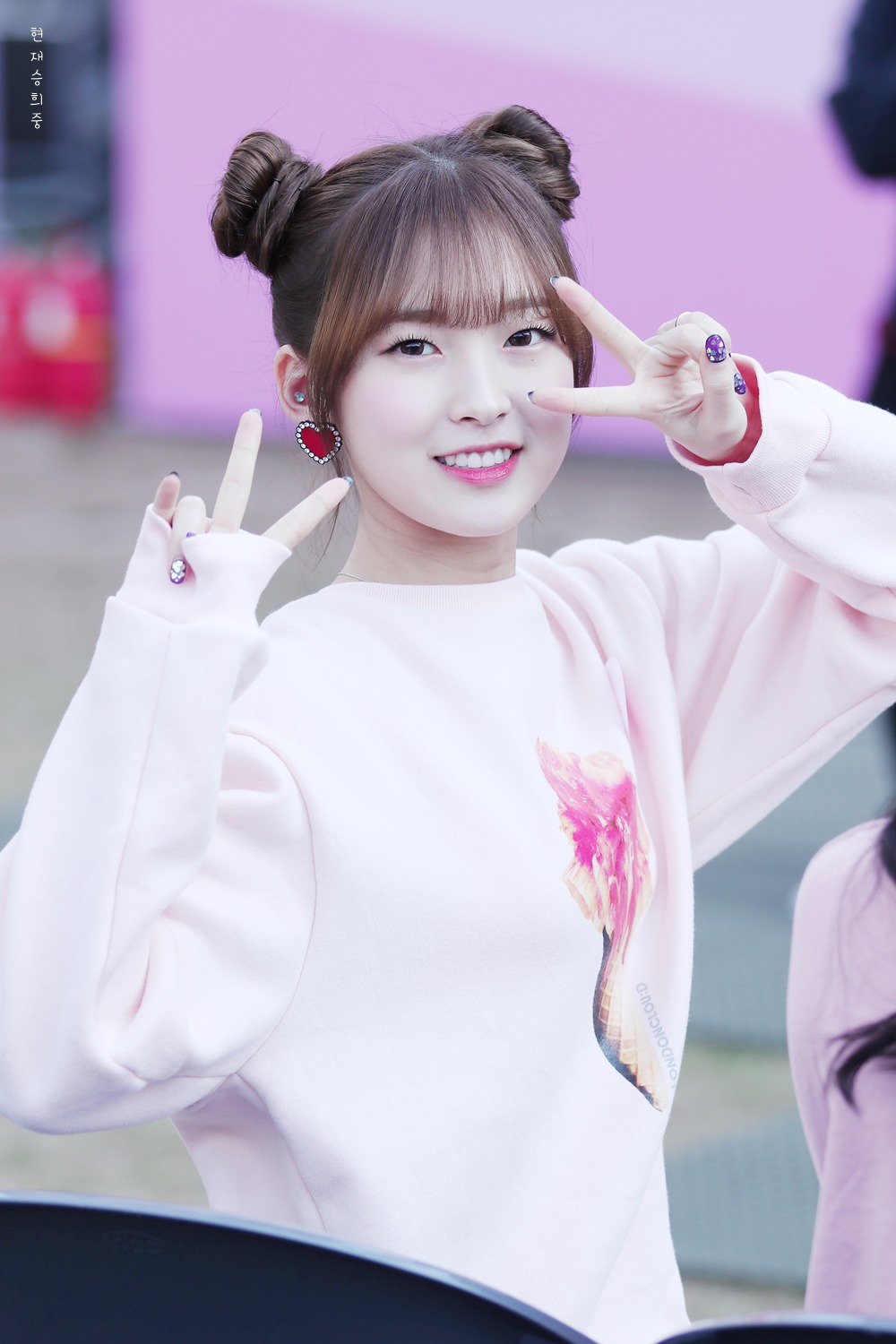
K-Pop singer Arin wearing double buns.

Double or pigtail buns are often called odango (お団子), which is also a type of Japanese dumpling (also called dango).

In China, it is common among young girls or women to have the two buns hairstyle, which is called yaji (丫髻) or shuangyaji (双丫髻). The name comes from having hair buns, often two buns on either side of the crown of the head, giving the hair a shape similar to the Chinese character 丫. This hairstyle was worn during many different Chinese dynasties. There are also other hair styles called niújiǎotóu (牛角头). It was a commonly used hairstyle up until the early 20th century, and can still be seen today when traditional attire is used. Those hairstyle differs from the odango in that it is gender neutral; Chinese paintings of children have frequently depicted girls as having matching ox horns or two buns, while boys have a single bun on the back or also two buns.

In English-speaking regions, they are called side buns, double buns or "space buns" in reference to an iconic hairstyle worn by Star Wars character Princess Leia. Fellow Star Wars character Rey from 2015's Star Wars: The Force Awakens and its sequels would wear a "triple bun" hairstyle. In the United States, they were a popular festival hair trend in the 1990s.

== In everyday culture ==
The position of a hair bun on the head can convey cues about the person's style, colored by social expectations. From the perspective of the United States, Hannah Goldfield wrote for The New York Times that a high bun "conveys a certain uncouth youthfulness, a sense of unseriousness, a need to provoke" and the low bun is its opposite. Perceptions have changed with time, however.

Similarly, a messier bun, wherein hair is not pulled back tightly, can convey a carefree and casual persona or mood.

== Bun or top knot hairstyle in men ==
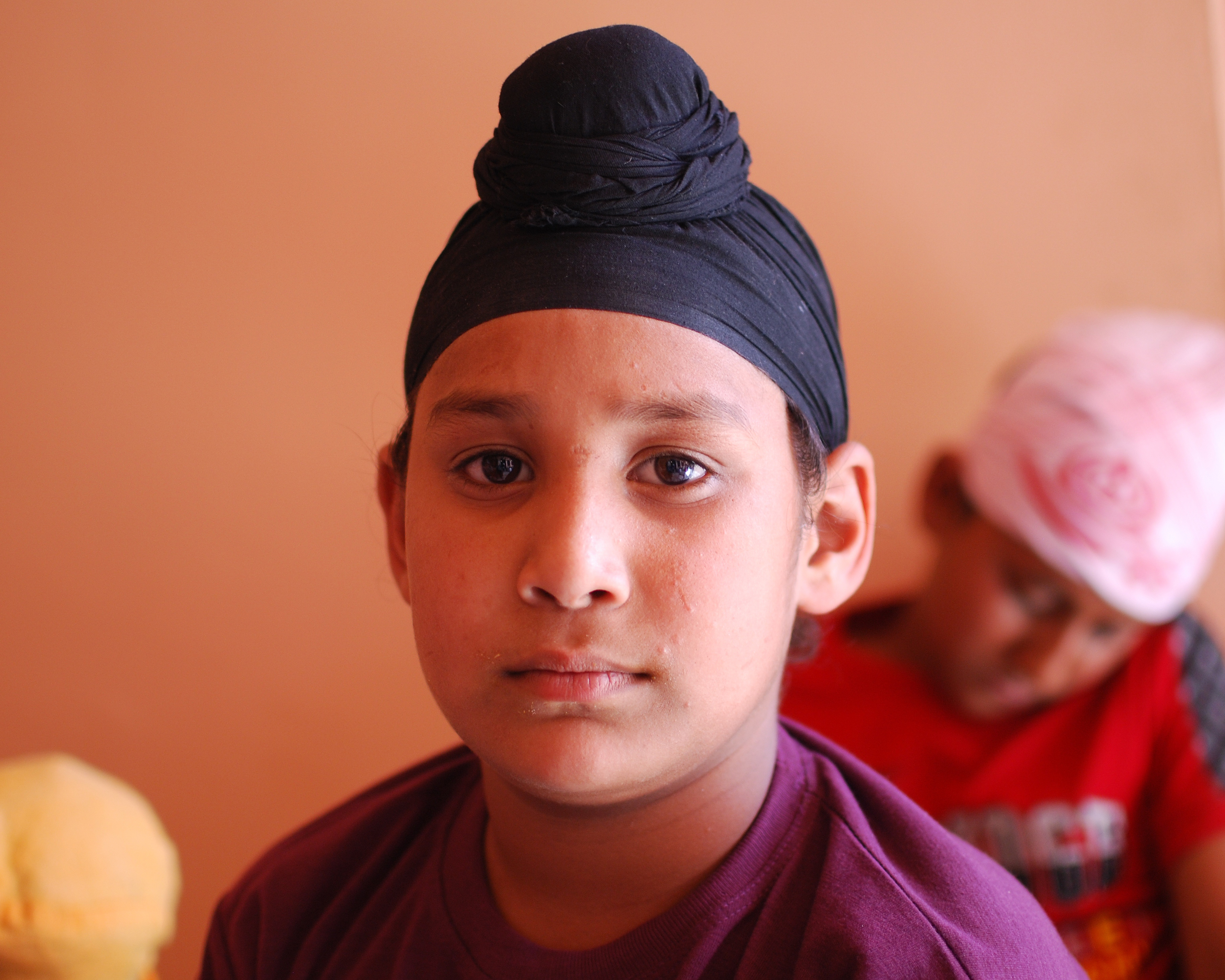
A Sikh boy with a rishi knot wearing a patka.

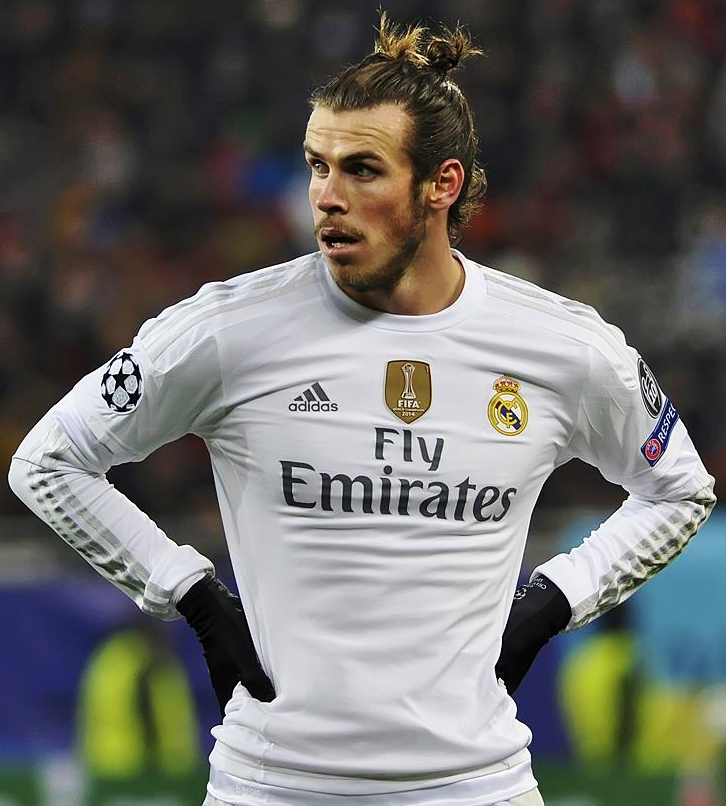
Footballer Gareth Bale wearing a man-bun during a match in 2015.

Men in ancient China wore their hair in a topknot bun (Touji 頭髻); visual depictions of this can be seen on the terracotta soldiers in the Terracotta Army sculptures. They were worn until the end of the Ming Dynasty in AD 1644, after which the Qing Dynasty government forced men to adopt the Manchu queue hairstyle (queue order).

Men of the Joseon Era of Korea wore the sangtu as a symbol of marriage. 16th century Japanese men wore the chonmage for samurai warriors and sumo wrestlers. In the West, topknots were frequently worn by "barbarian" peoples in the eyes of the Romans, such as the Goths, Vandals, and the Lombards. Later, the hairstyle survived in the pagan Scandinavian north (some believe the topknot hairstyle contains elements of Odinic cult worship) and with the eastern nomadic tribes such as the Bulgars, Cumans and Cossacks.

=== Rishi knot ===
The rishi (sage) knot is a topknot worn by Sikhi boys and men as a religious practice, in which the hair is formed into a bun. In the Sikh tradition, a turban is then worn atop the bun. This hairstyle is also known as joora, and has been traditionally worn by Hindu mendicants.

=== Man bun ===
The man-bun is a topknot influenced by the Asian style worn by long-haired men in the Western world. In London, the modern man-bun style may have begun around 2010, although David Beckham sported one earlier. The first Google Trends examples started to appear in 2013, and searches showed a steep increase through 2015. Some of the first celebrities to wear the style were George Harrison, Jared Leto, Joakim Noah, Chris Hemsworth, Leonardo DiCaprio, Scot Pollard, and Orlando Bloom. The hairstyle is also associated with Brooklyn hipsters.

== See also ==
- List of hairstyles
- Bantu knot
- Chignon
- Guanli, the traditional Chinese coming of age ceremony, after which men ceased to trim their hair and wore it as a bun or topknot
