= Claw clip =

Hair accessory

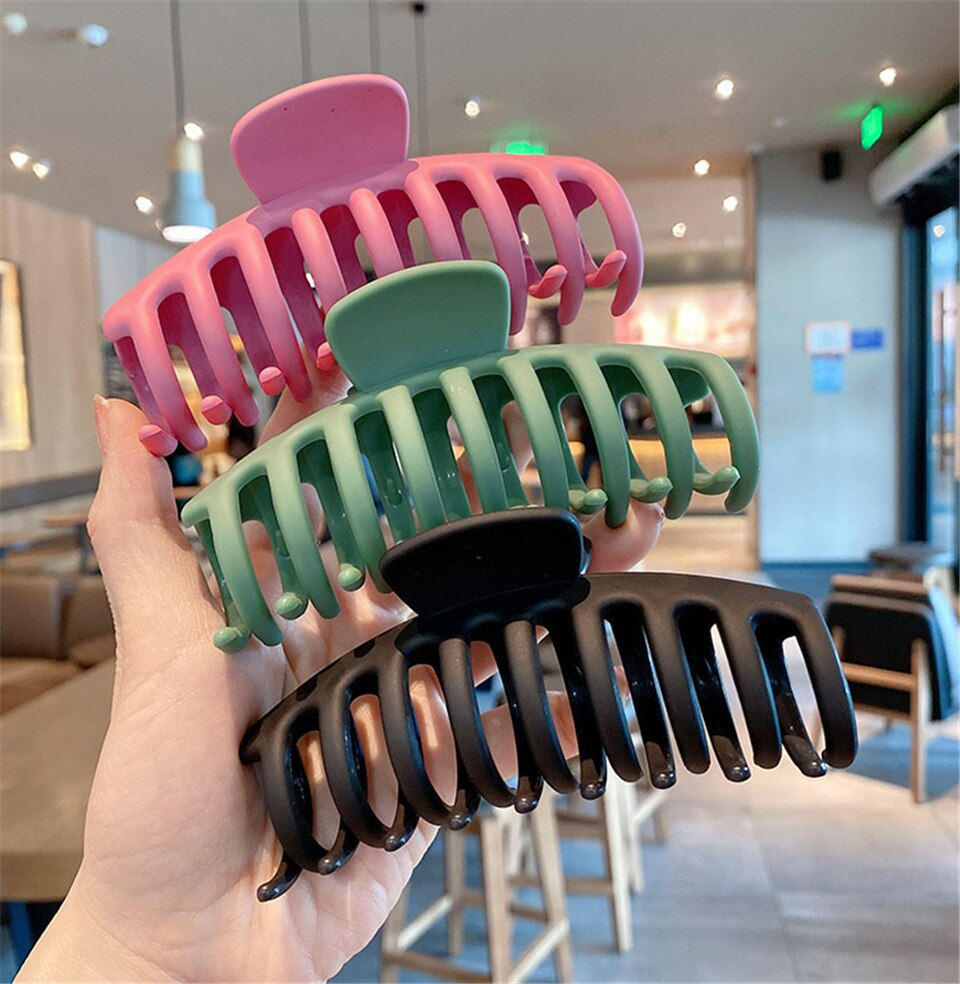
Examples of claw clips

A claw clip, also called a jaw clip, is a hair accessory with metal or plastic teeth that clamp into the wearer's hair.

== Origin and design ==
The claw clip was designed by Christian Potut, a French businessman. In 1986, his company CSP Diffusion opened its first factory located in Oyonnax, France, where it produced plastic items like combs and yo-yos. "One day I kept crossing and uncrossing my fingers and that's when I had my lightbulb moment. I said to myself: 'I sell combs and clips, why don't I combine the two?'" he told the BBC.

By the mid-1990s, the company sold hundreds of thousands of hair clips each month and had more than fifty employees. Potut's top markets were US and Japan. He did not apply for a patent, and though his design was protected in France, it was not legally protected worldwide. He told the BBC that "it's been copied because only good things are worth copying."

The claw clip may have been inspired by the banana clip, which was popular during the 1980s.

== History ==
Claw clips were common in the 1990s when plastic hair accessories grew in popularity. Hairdos with claw clips tend to be simple and easy to perform, ranging from spiky 90s-style updos, twisted buns held in place by the clip, and a "waterfall" style in which hair flows over of the top of the clip. Unlike tight hairstyles, claw clip updos result in less hair breakage.

Claw clips were associated with Jennifer Aniston's character Rachel Green on the TV show Friends.

In 2018, an Alexander Wang fashion show featured large chrome silver claw clips stamped with Wang's name.

Claw clips had a resurgence in the 2020s as part of the Y2K fashion revival, gaining popularity on TikTok and receiving attention from celebrities such as Kendall Jenner, Bella Hadid, and Hailey Bieber.

In several instances, car accidents have caused the clips to lodge into the wearers' heads.
