= Hairpin =

Long pin used to secure the hair

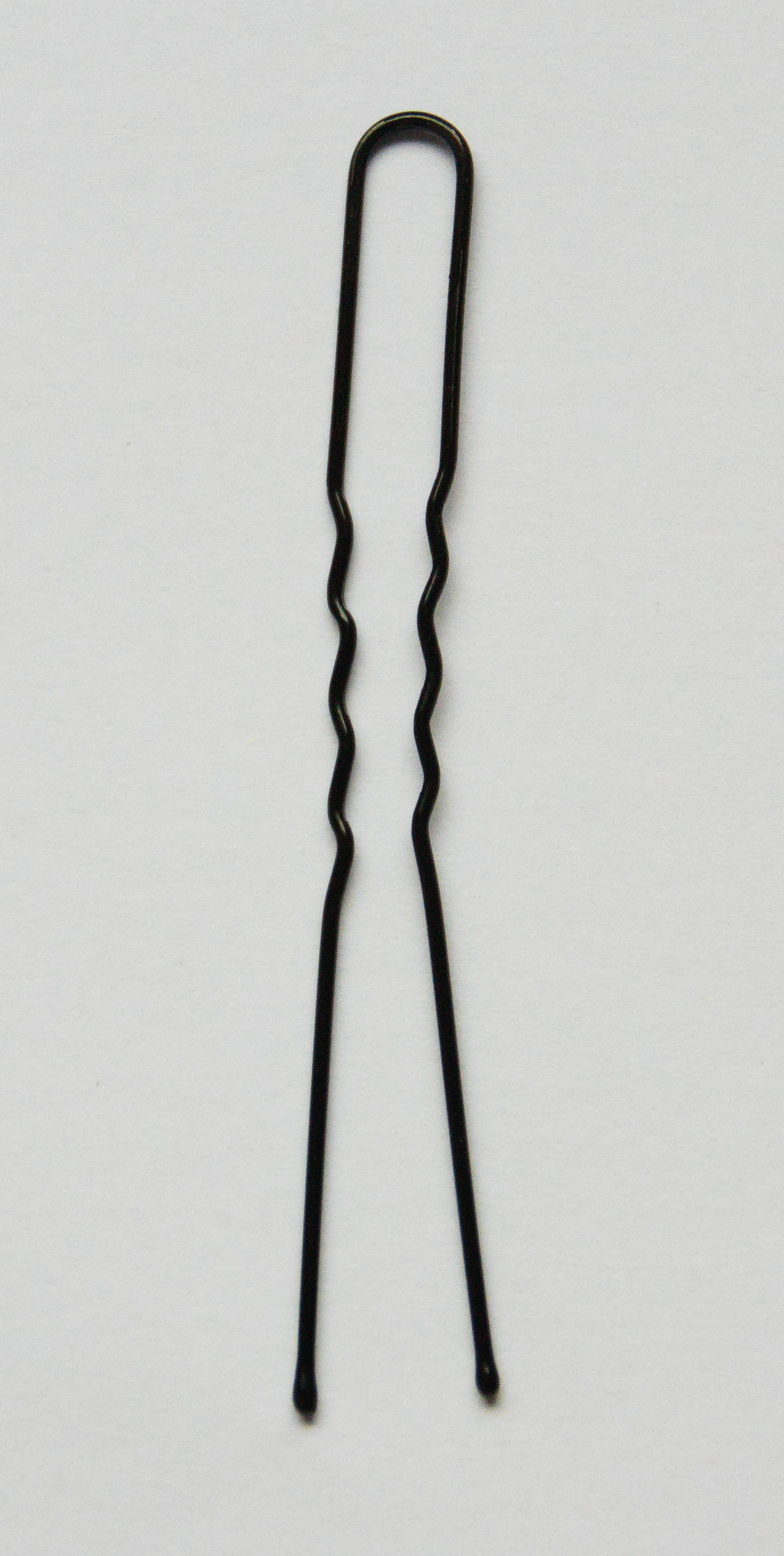
A modern hair pin, typically used for formal styling such as updos and buns

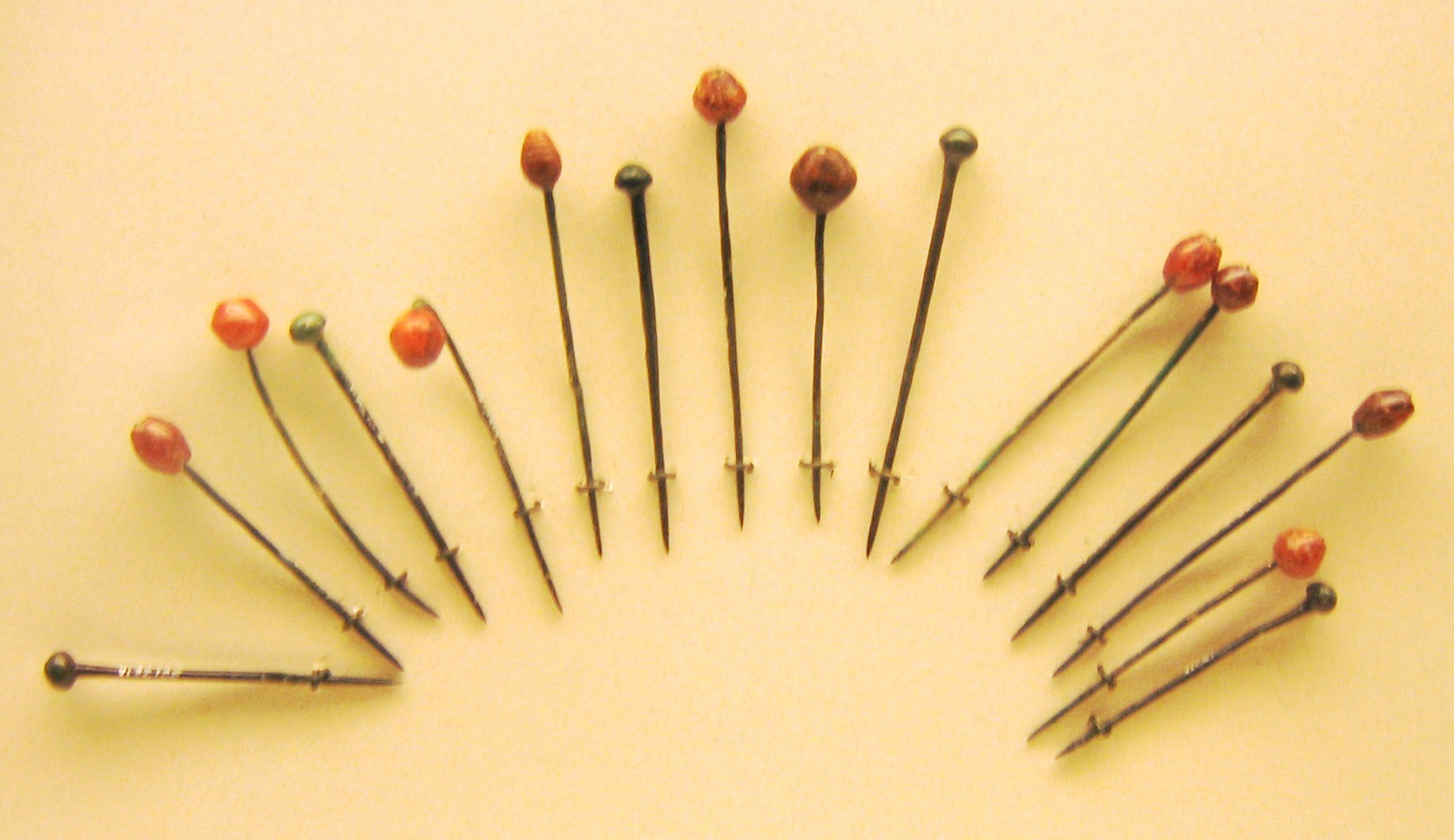
Hairpins (around 600 BC)

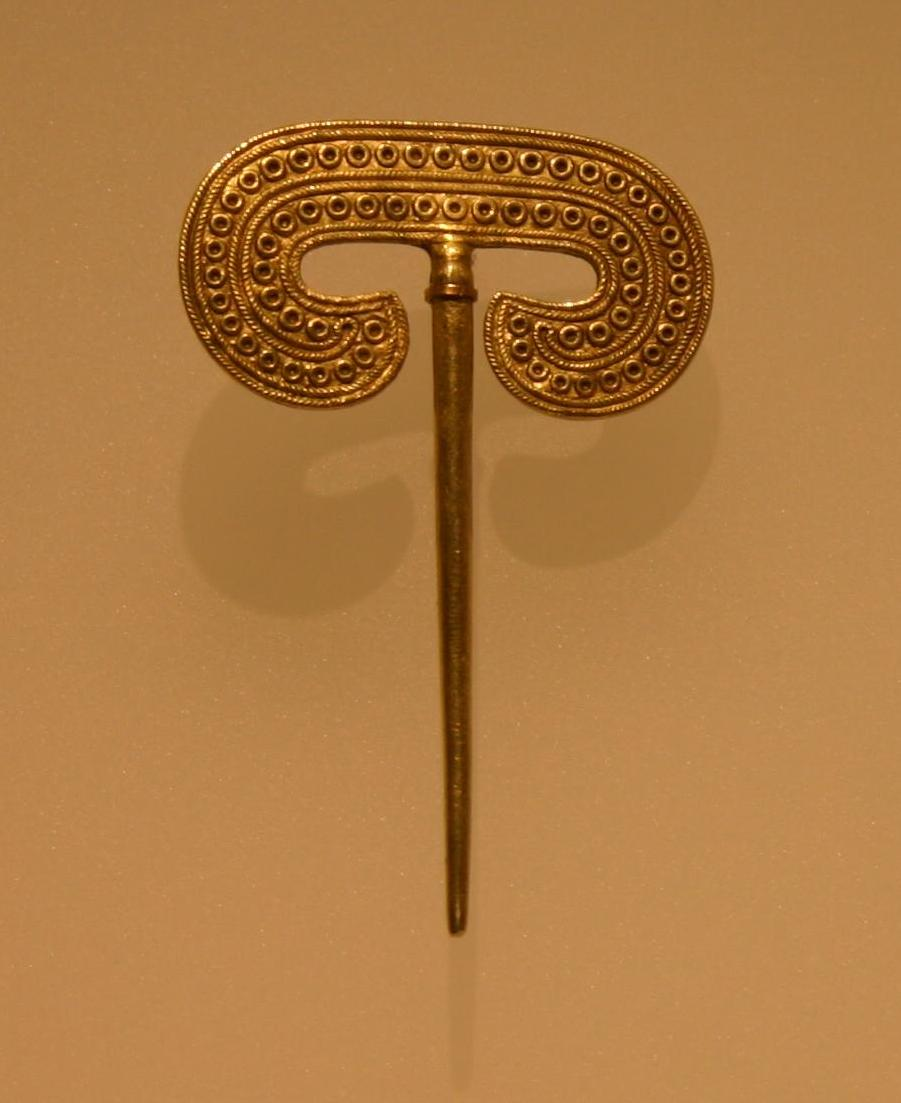
A golden double-spiral-headed pin from Georgia (3rd millennium BC)

A hairpin or hair pin is a long device used to hold a person's hair in place. It may be used simply to secure long hair out of the way for convenience or as part of an elaborate hairstyle or coiffure. The earliest evidence for dressing the hair may be seen in carved "Venus figurines" such as the Venus of Brassempouy and the Venus of Willendorf. The creation of different hairstyles, especially among women, seems to be common to all cultures and all periods and many past, and current, societies use hairpins.

Hairpins made of metal, ivory, bronze, carved wood, etc. were used in ancient Egypt for securing decorated hairstyles. Such hairpins suggest, as graves show, that many were luxury objects among the Egyptians and later the Greeks, Etruscans, and Romans. Major success came in 1901 with the invention of the spiral hairpin by New Zealand inventor Ernest Godward. This was a predecessor of the hair clip.

The hairpin may be decorative and encrusted with jewels and ornaments, or it may be utilitarian, and designed to be almost invisible while holding a hairstyle in place. Some hairpins are a single straight pin, but modern versions are more likely to be constructed from different lengths of wire that are bent in half with a u-shaped end and a few kinks along the two opposite portions. The finished pin may vary from two to six inches in last length. The length of the wires enables placement in several designs of hairstyles to hold the nature in place. The kinks enable retaining the pin during normal movements.

== Hairpins in Chinese culture ==
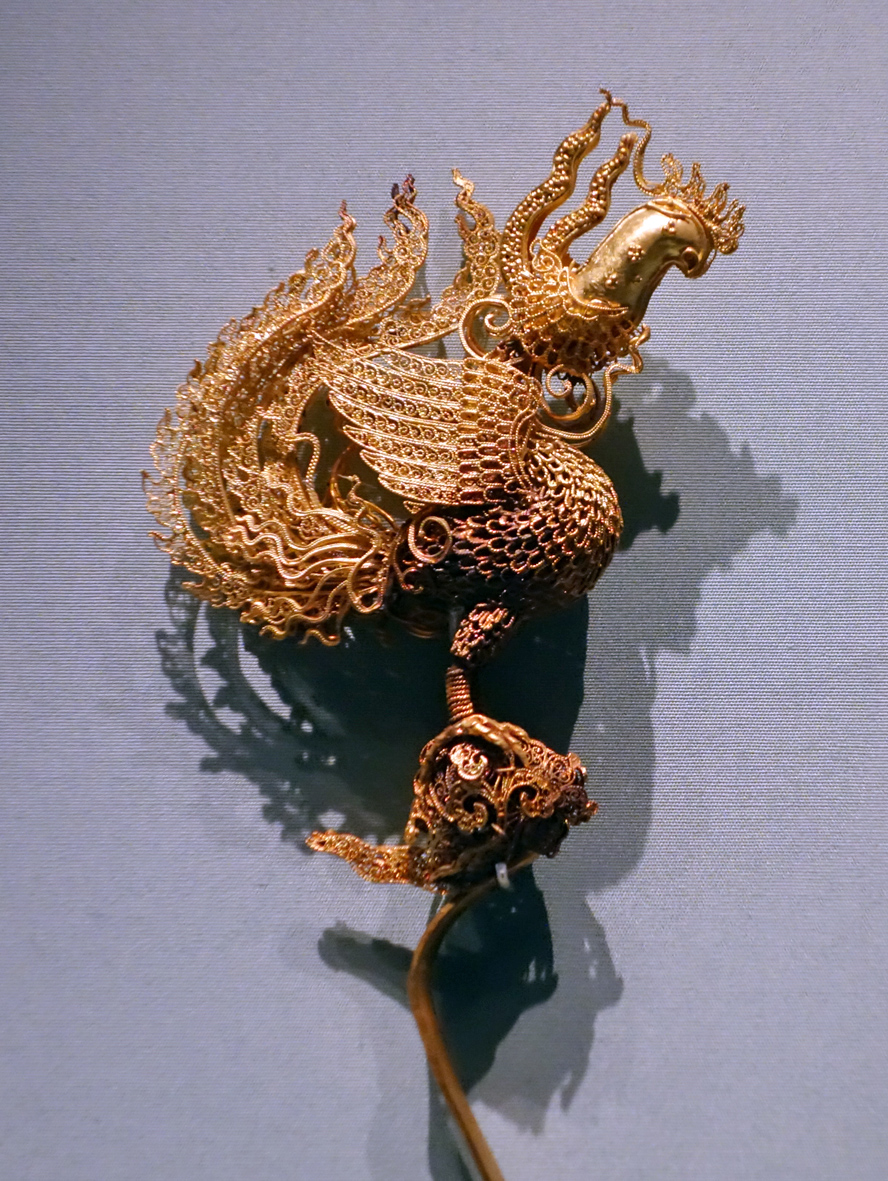
Gold phoenix hairpin found in the Ming dynasty tomb of Prince Chuang of Liang (梁莊王, 1411–1441), 15th century.

Hairpins (generally known as fa-zan; Chinese: 髮簪) are an important symbol in Chinese culture. In ancient China, hairpins were worn by men as well as women, and they were essential items for everyday hairstyling, mainly for securing and decorating a hair bun. Furthermore, hairpins worn by women could also represent their social status.

In Han Chinese culture, when young girls reached the age of fifteen, they were allowed to take part in a rite of passage known as ji li (Chinese: 筓禮), or "hairpin initiation". This ceremony marked the coming of age of young women. Particularly, before the age of fifteen, girls did not use hairpins as they wore their hair in braids, and they were considered as children. When they turned fifteen, they could be considered as young women after the ceremony, and they started to style their hair as buns secured and embellished by hairpins. This practice indicated that these young women could now enter into marriage. However, if a young woman had not been consented to marriage before age twenty, or she had not yet participated in a coming of age ceremony, she would attend a ceremony when she turned twenty.

In comparison with ji li, the male equivalent known as guan li (Chinese: 冠禮) or "hat initiation", usually took place five years later, at the age of twenty. In the 21st century Hanfu Movement, an attempt to revive the traditional Han Chinese coming of age ceremonies has been made, and the ideal age to attend the ceremony is twenty years old for all genders.

While hairpins can symbolize the transition from childhood to adulthood, they were closely connected to the concept of marriage as well. At the time of an engagement, the fiancée may take a hairpin from her hair and give it to her fiancé as a pledge: this can be seen as a reversal of the Western tradition, in which the future groom presents an engagement ring to his betrothed. After the wedding ceremony, the husband should put the hairpin back into his spouse's hair.

Hair has always carried many psychological, philosophical, romantic, and cultural meanings in Chinese culture. In Han culture, people call the union between two people jie-fa (Chinese: 結髮), literally "tying hair". During the wedding ceremony, some Chinese couples exchange a lock of hair as a pledge, while others break a hairpin into two parts, and then, each of the betrothed take one part with them for keeping. If this couple were ever to get separated in the future, when they reunite, they can piece the two halves together, and the completed hairpin would serve as a proof of their identities as well as a symbol of their reunion. In addition, a married couple is sometimes referred to as jie-fa fu-qi (Chinese: 結髮夫妻), an idiom which implies the relationship between the pair is very intimate and happy, just like how their hair has been tied together.

== Gallery ==
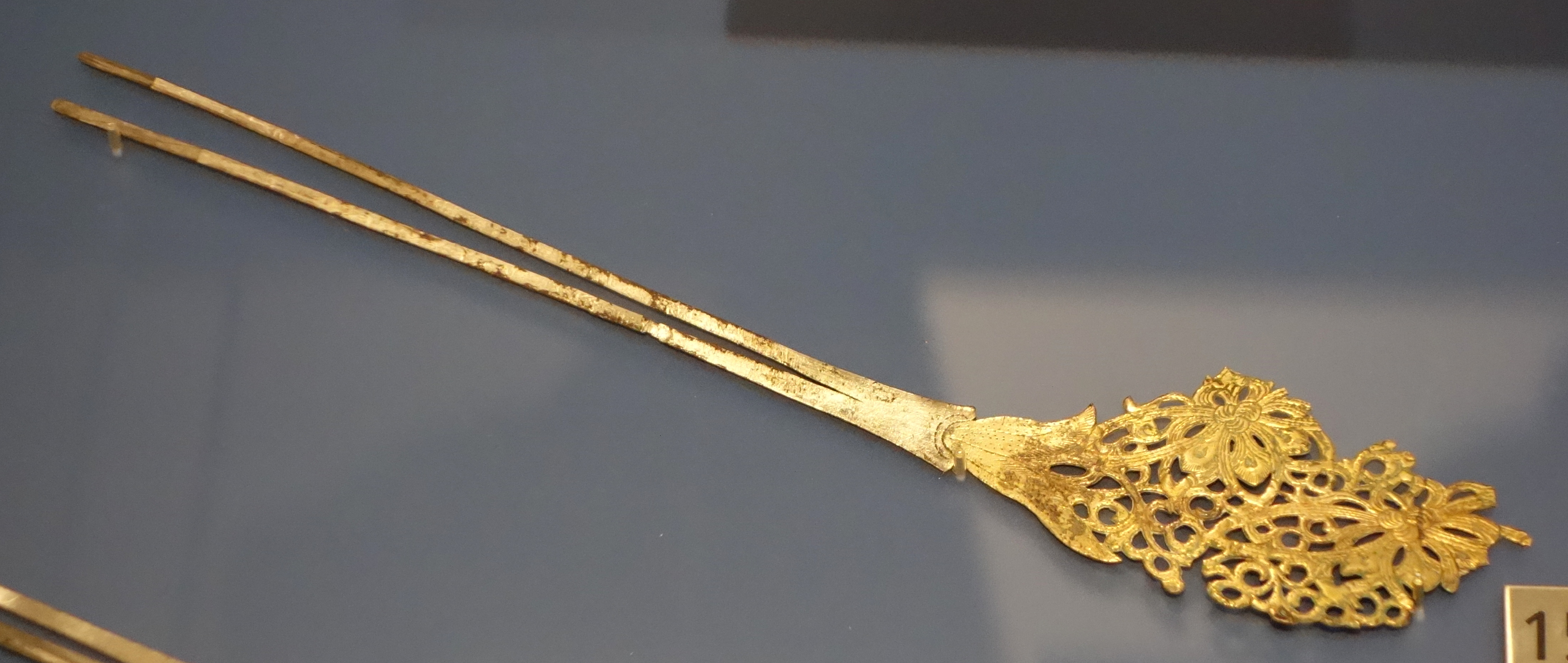
Chinese Tang dynasty (618–907) hairpin

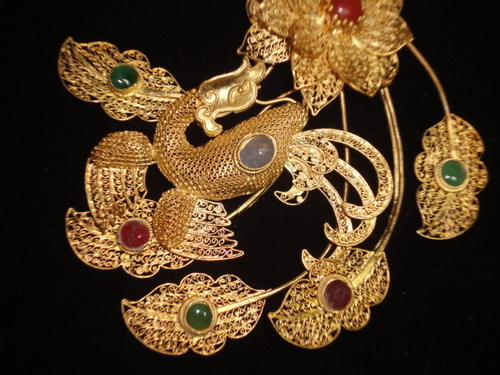
Chinese Ming dynasty (1368–1644) hairpin

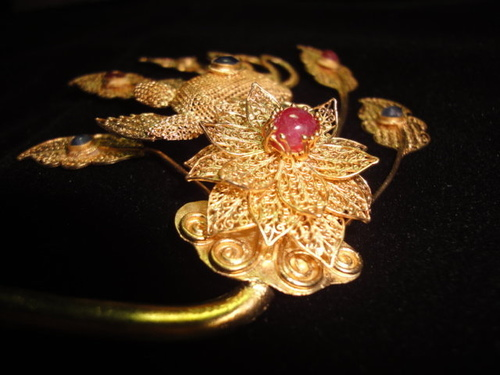
Chinese Ming dynasty (1368–1644) hairpin

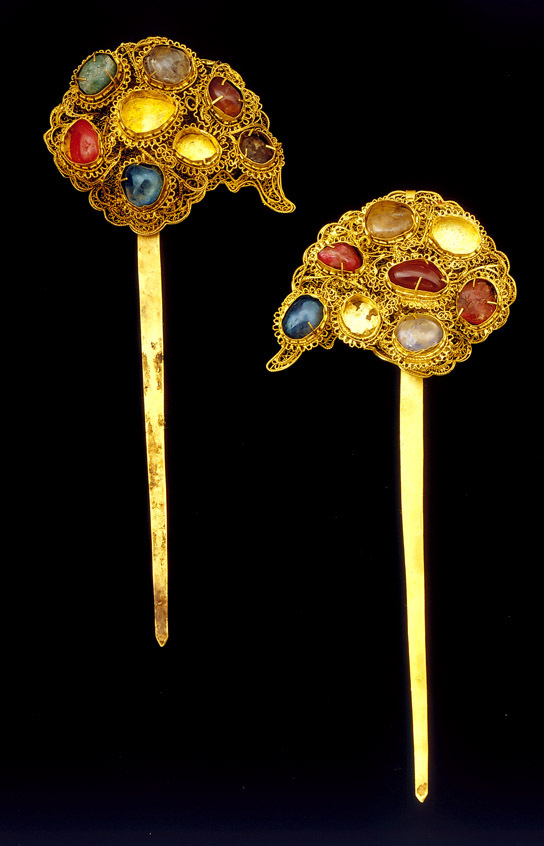
Chinese Ming dynasty hairpins, 15th century

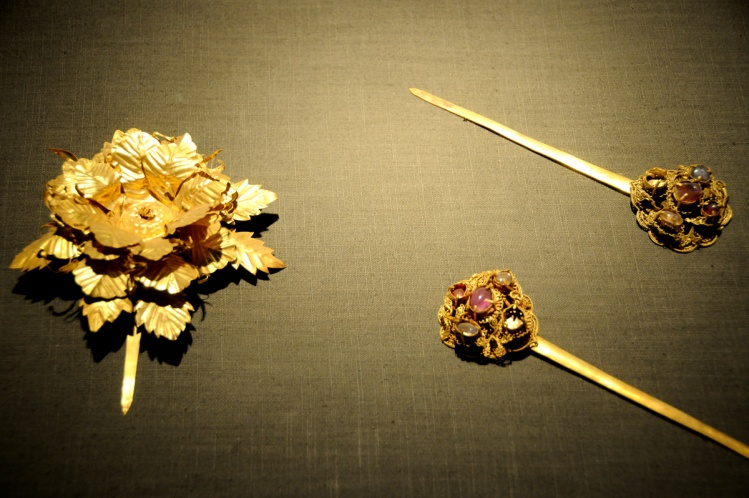
Chinese Ming dynasty hairpins, 15th century

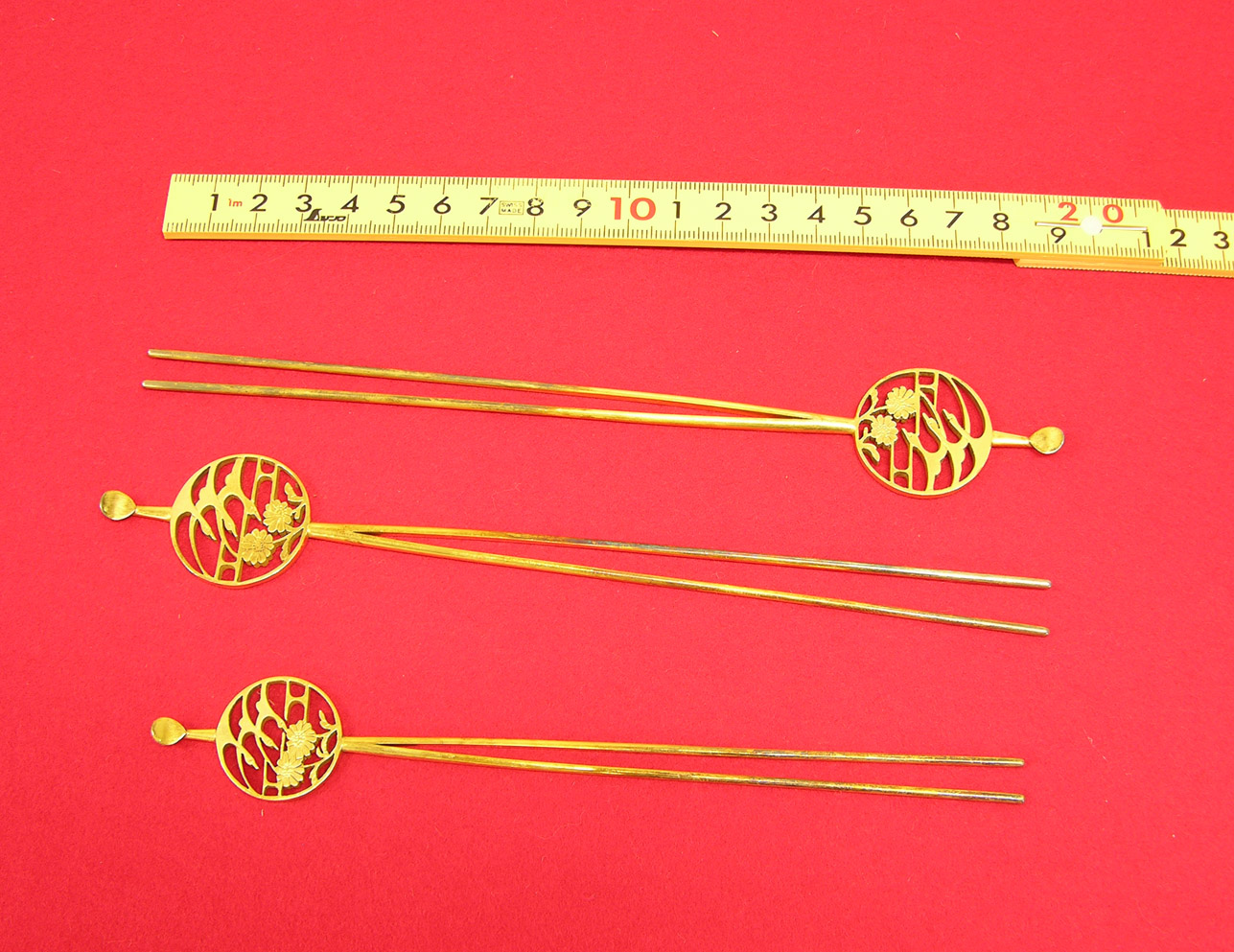
Japanese hirauchi kanzashi, period unknown

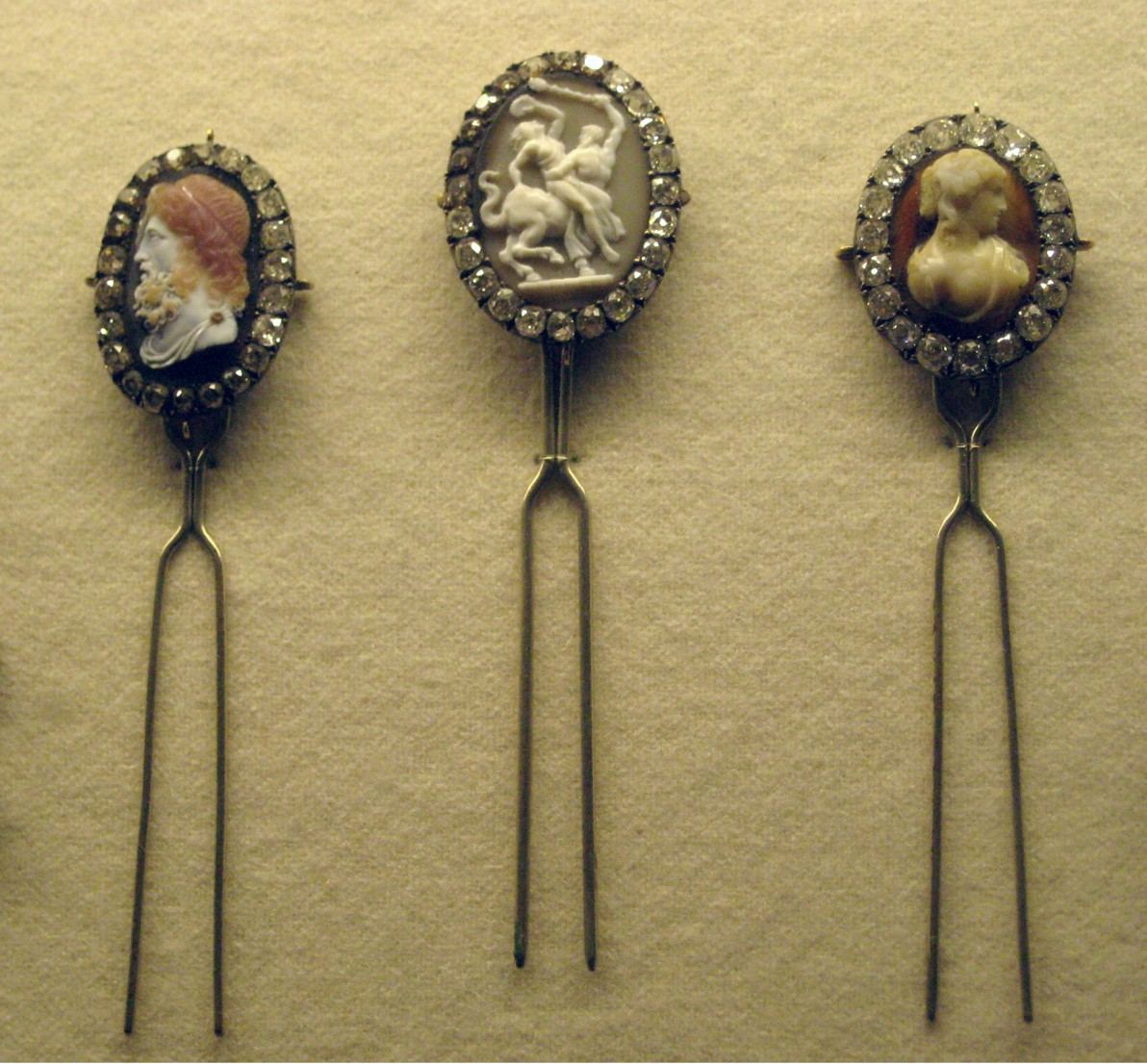
Russian hairpins from Moscow, probably 18th or 19th century

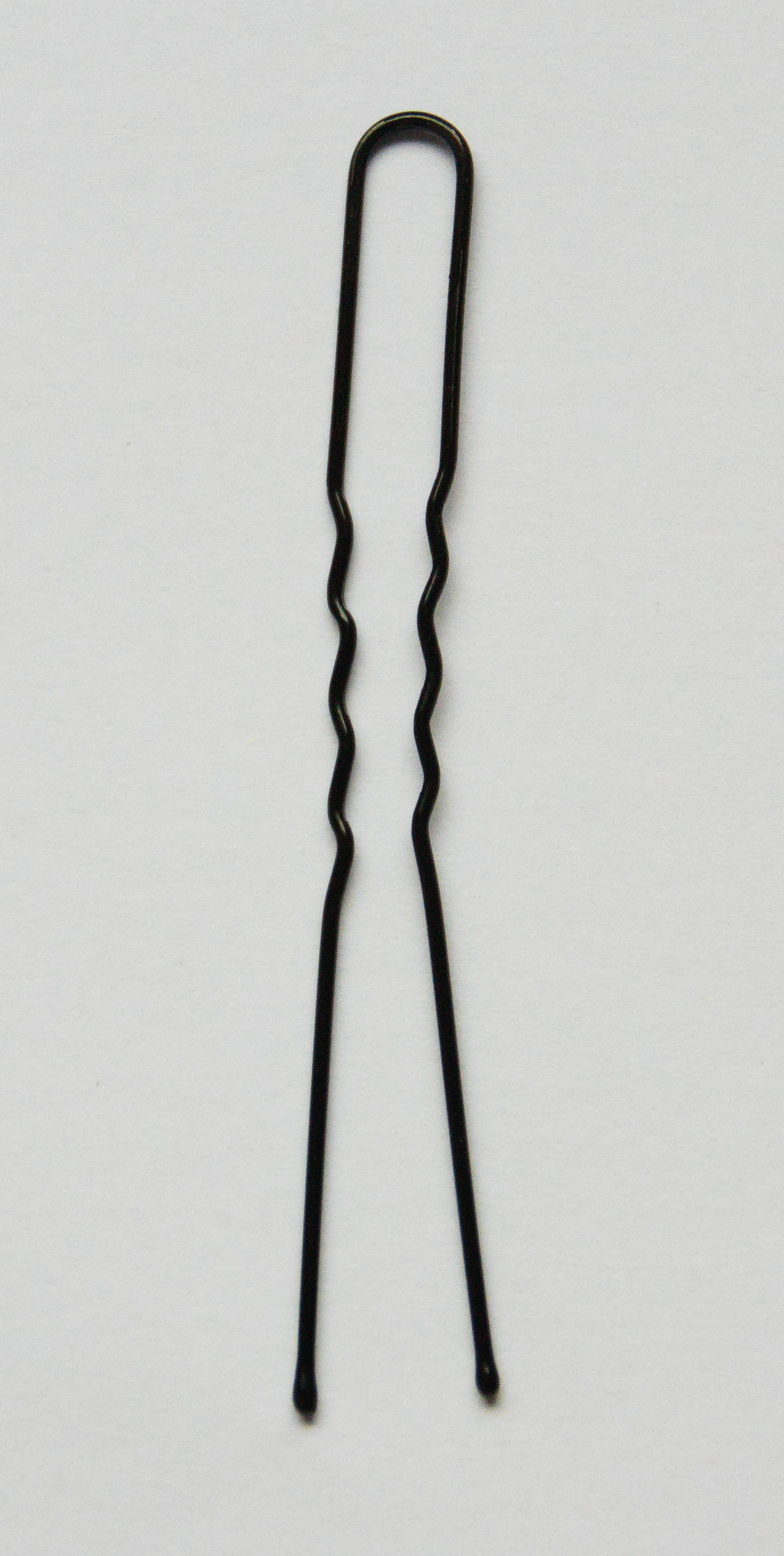
Modern U-shaped hairpin made out of plastic-coated metal

== See also ==
- Bobby pin
- Hair stick
- Hatpin
- Hair clip
- Kanzashi
