= Hair stick =

Device used for holding hair in place

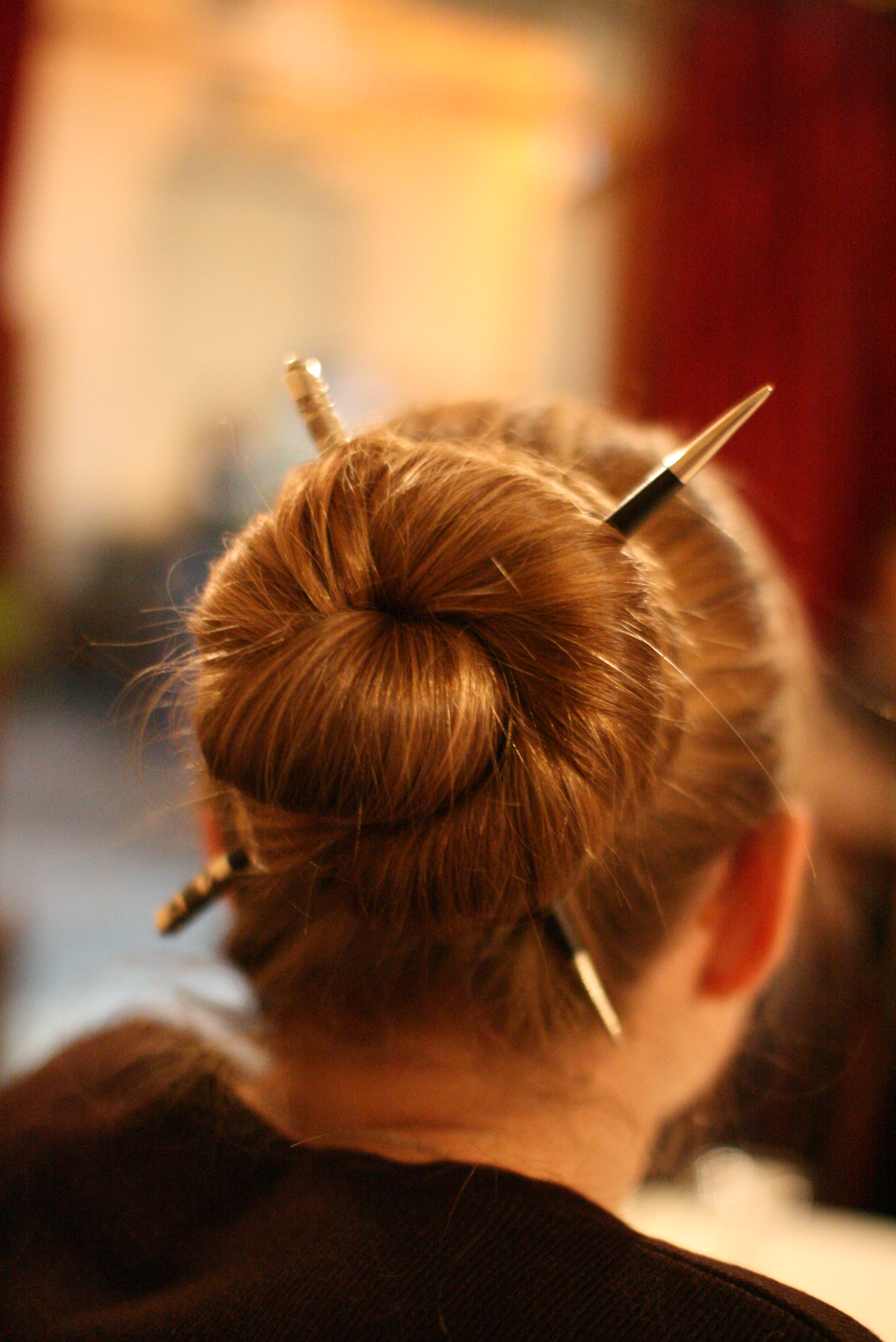
Hair sticks holding up hair in a bun

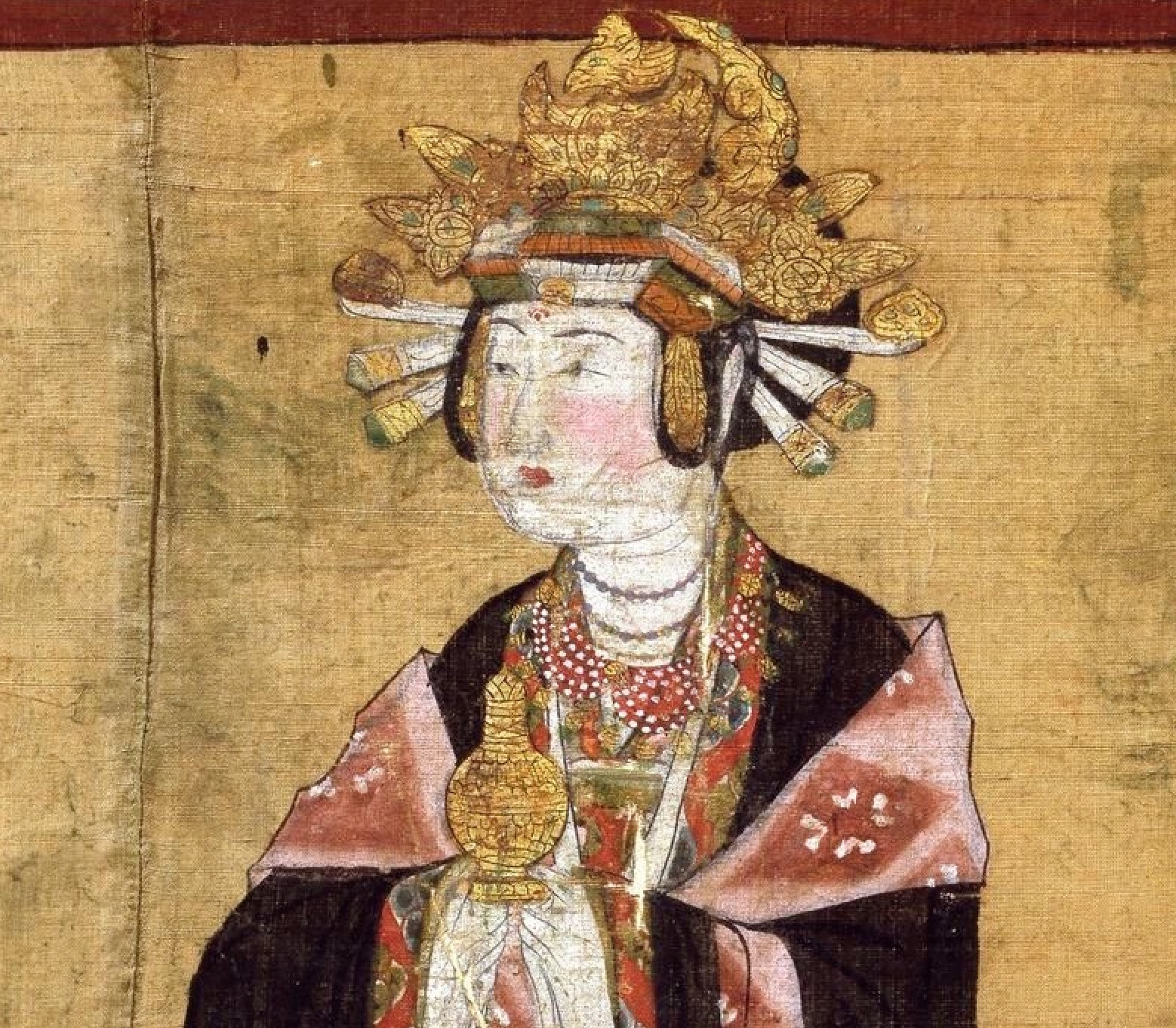
Portrait of a religious donor wearing hair sticks decorated with gold and jade, 983 AD

A hair stick (also fazan:发簪 or zanzi:簪子) is a device, long and thin, usually between five and nine inches (12.7 cm to 22.9 cm) long, used to hold a person's hair bun or similar hairstyle in place. It may be straight or tapered; it is often pointed to ease insertion.

Like hairpins, hair sticks may be anywhere from quite plain and simple to elaborate and decorative; some feature jeweled or carved designs that make them stand out as pieces of jewelry. The price of hair sticks varies greatly depending on the style, materials, and craftsmanship: the cheapest pairs of plastic hair sticks can cost less than a dollar, while a single, hand-crafted hair stick by an artist can cost over two hundred dollars.

Other everyday objects, such as pens, pencils, and chopsticks, are often used as impromptu hair sticks.

== Historical use ==
Hair sticks have been in use for thousands of years, and have been found in cultures of the ancient Egyptians, Romans, and Greeks, India and China. Although some of these have been jewelled, luxury items, such as the gold hair sticks of Egypt, more common, wooden hair sticks have also been found in cultures such as Rome, suggesting that they were in wide use amongst people regardless of their financial standing. However, the most influential culture on modern hair sticks has been Japanese, and in particular the use of decorative Japanese kanzashi.

Although many modern hair sticks draw more on the elaborate approach to the design of kanzashi than on the simpler designs for functional pins, kanzashi are used within a far more rigid and traditional environment. Kanzashi are frequently floral in design, especially those dictated by the changing of the seasons and used by geisha.

== Gallery ==
- Han Chinese: Chinese hairpin, Buyao
- Korean: Binyeo
- Japanese: Kanzashi
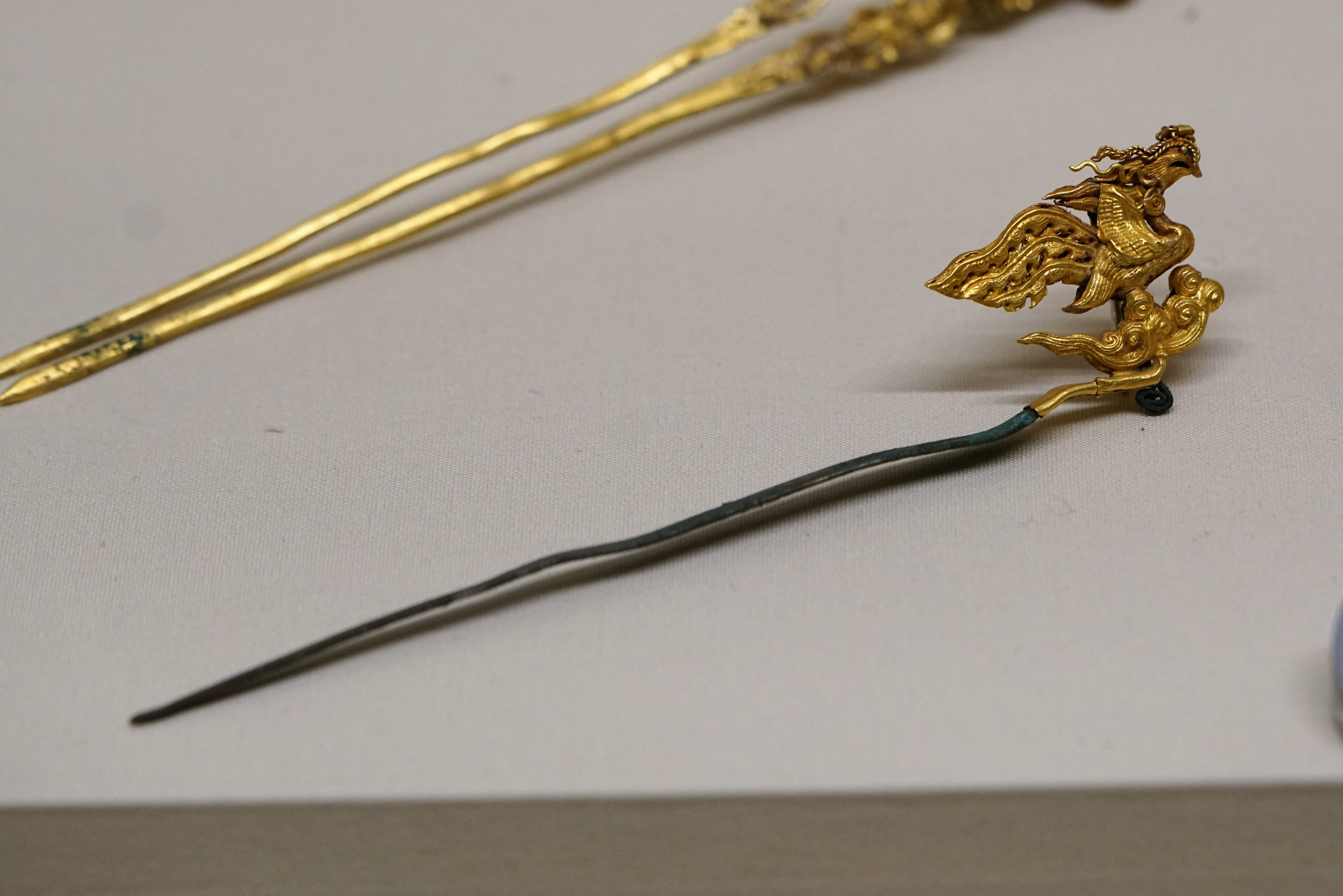
Chai (top) and ji (bottom), two types of Chinese hairpin

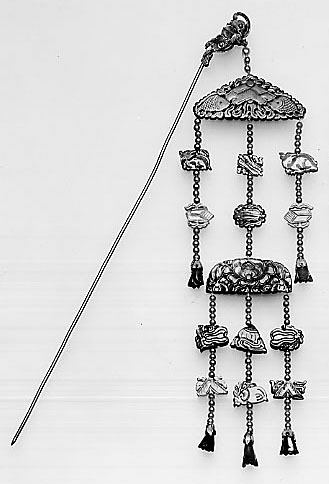
Buyao, a type of Chinese hairpin.

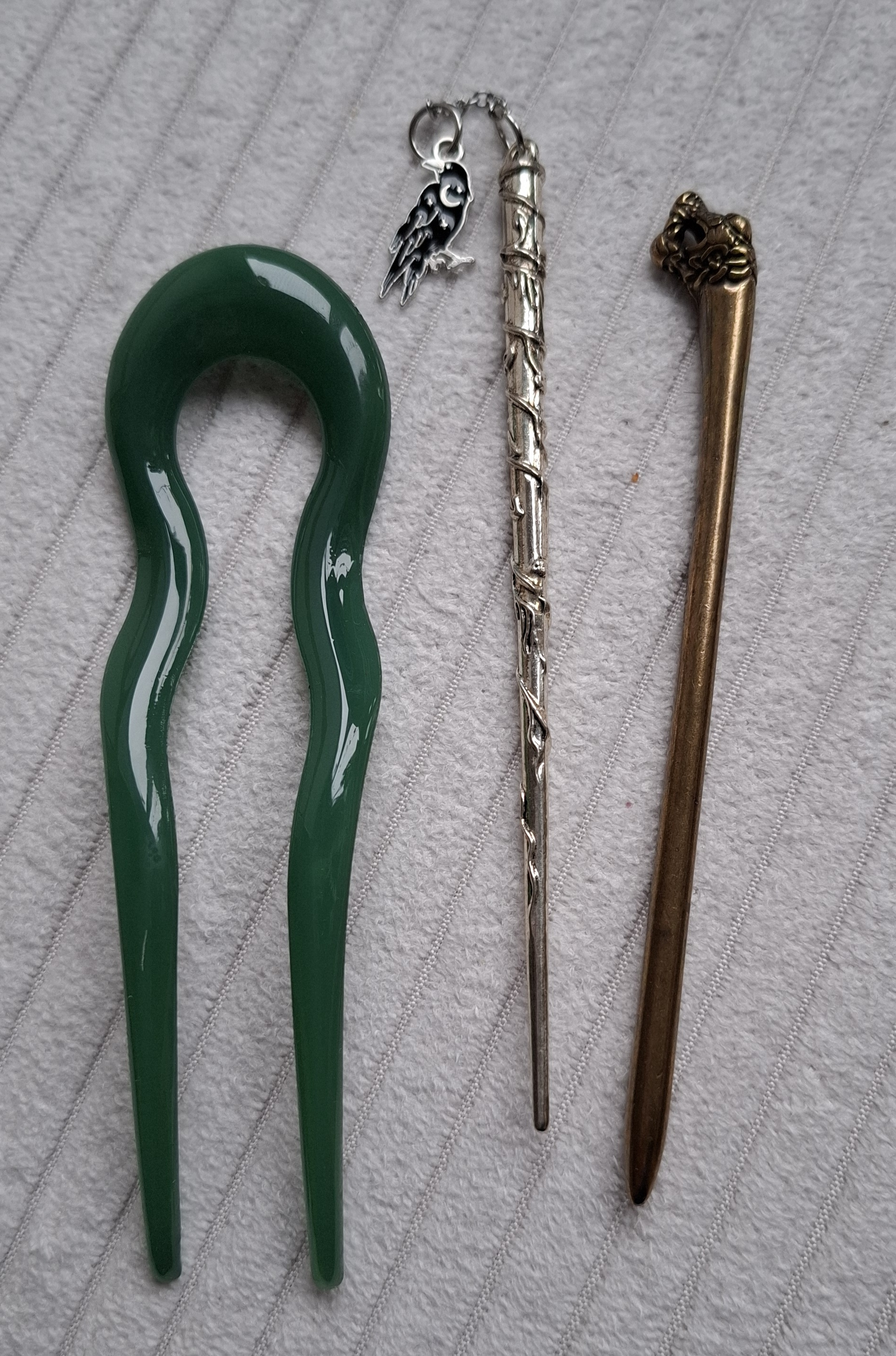
modern hair sticks made of acrylic and metal, right one references a viking age design from Hedeby

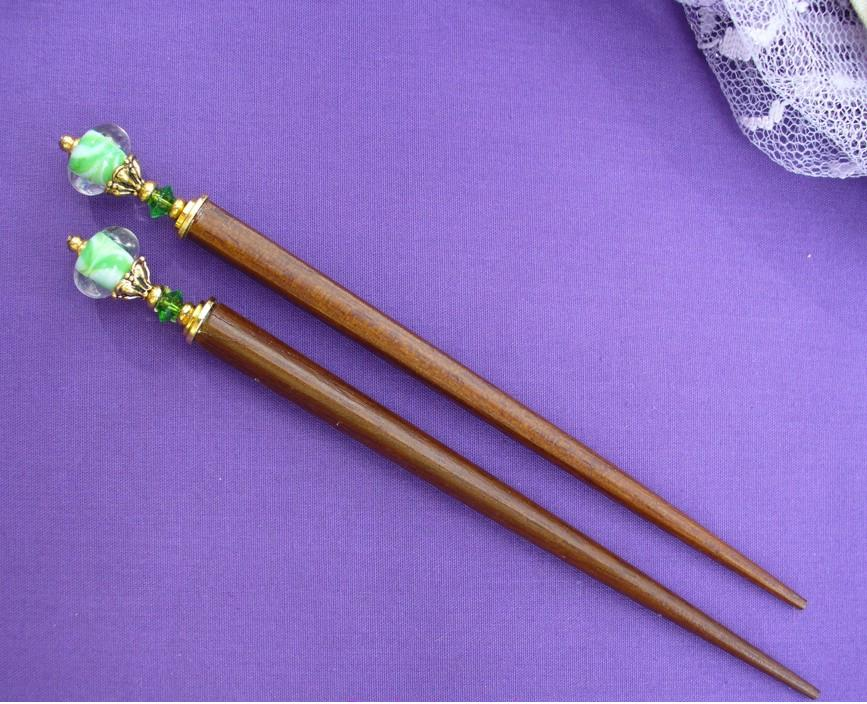
wooden hair sticks with decorative toppers

== See also ==
- Comb
- Hairpin
