= Hair clip =

Clasp for holding hair in place

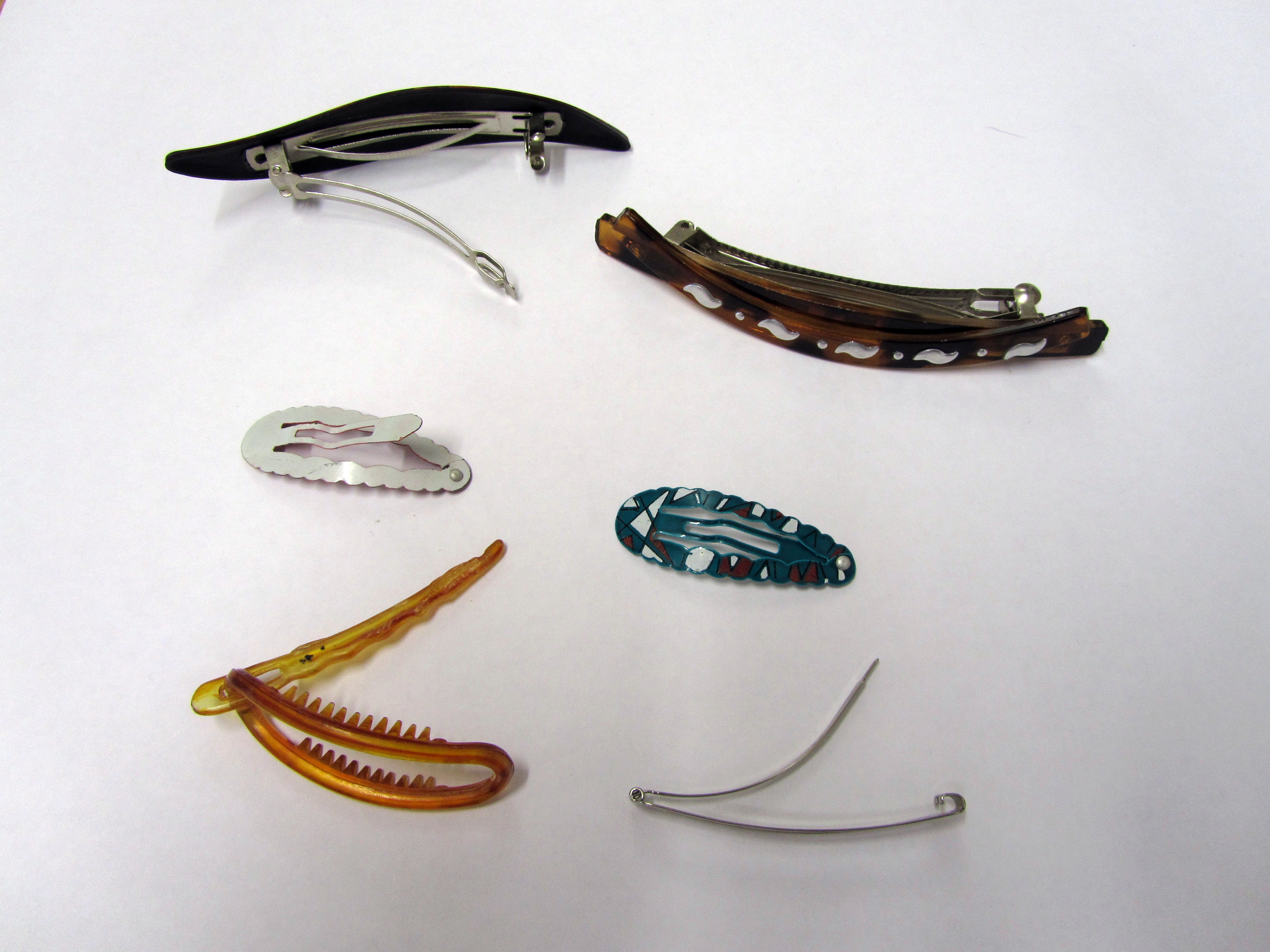
Various types of hair clips

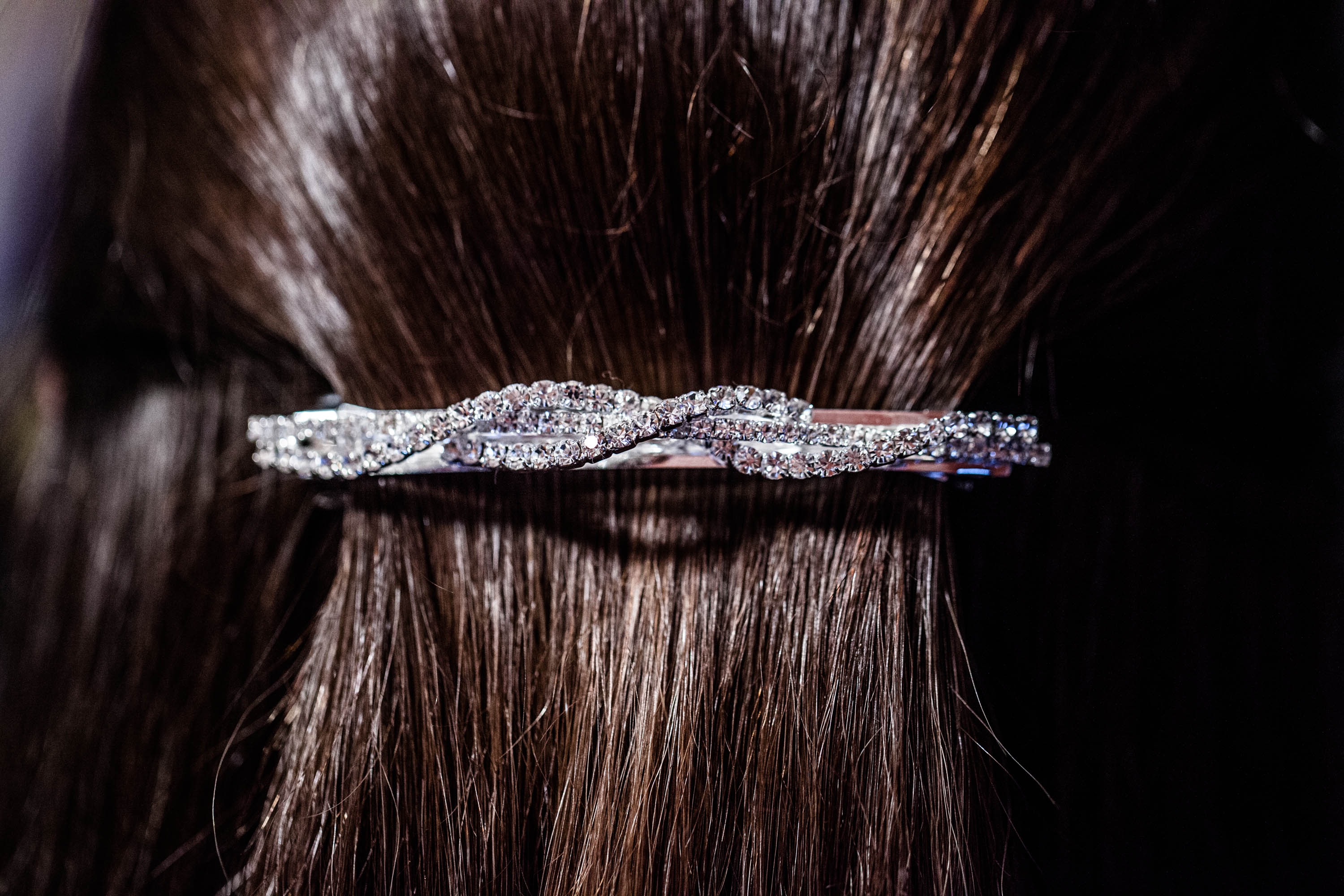
A barrette on the back of a woman's head

A barrette (American English), also known as a hair slide (British English), or a hair clip, is a clasp for holding hair in place. They are often made from metal or plastic and sometimes feature decorative fabric. In one type of barrette, a clasp is used to secure the barrette in place; the clasp opens when the two metal pieces at either side are pressed together.

Barrettes are worn in several different ways partly according to their size, with small ones often used at the front and large ones in the back to hold more hair. They are used to keep hair out of the eyes, or to secure a bun, French twist, or ponytail. Short metal "clip" barrettes are sometimes used to pull back front pieces of hair. Barrettes are also sometimes used purely for decorative purposes, usually by women.

Larger barrettes—as long as 3–4 in (8–10 cm)—are designed to pull back longer hair or a large amount of hair and are usually worn at the back of the head, often "tails up". If the intent is to pull hair back, the length of the barrette is not the only consideration; the width of the barrette also indicates approximately how much hair can be secured by it.

Many other kinds of hair clips were invented in the 20th century. The ones that are more well-known are the elongated hair clip (seen at the top of the "Various types of hair clips" image) which was invented in 1972 by Marnie Bjornson and the simple bendy clip which works by snapping the clip from a concave to convex position, springing it into a locked position, or opening it. Several of these are seen in the image.

== Types ==
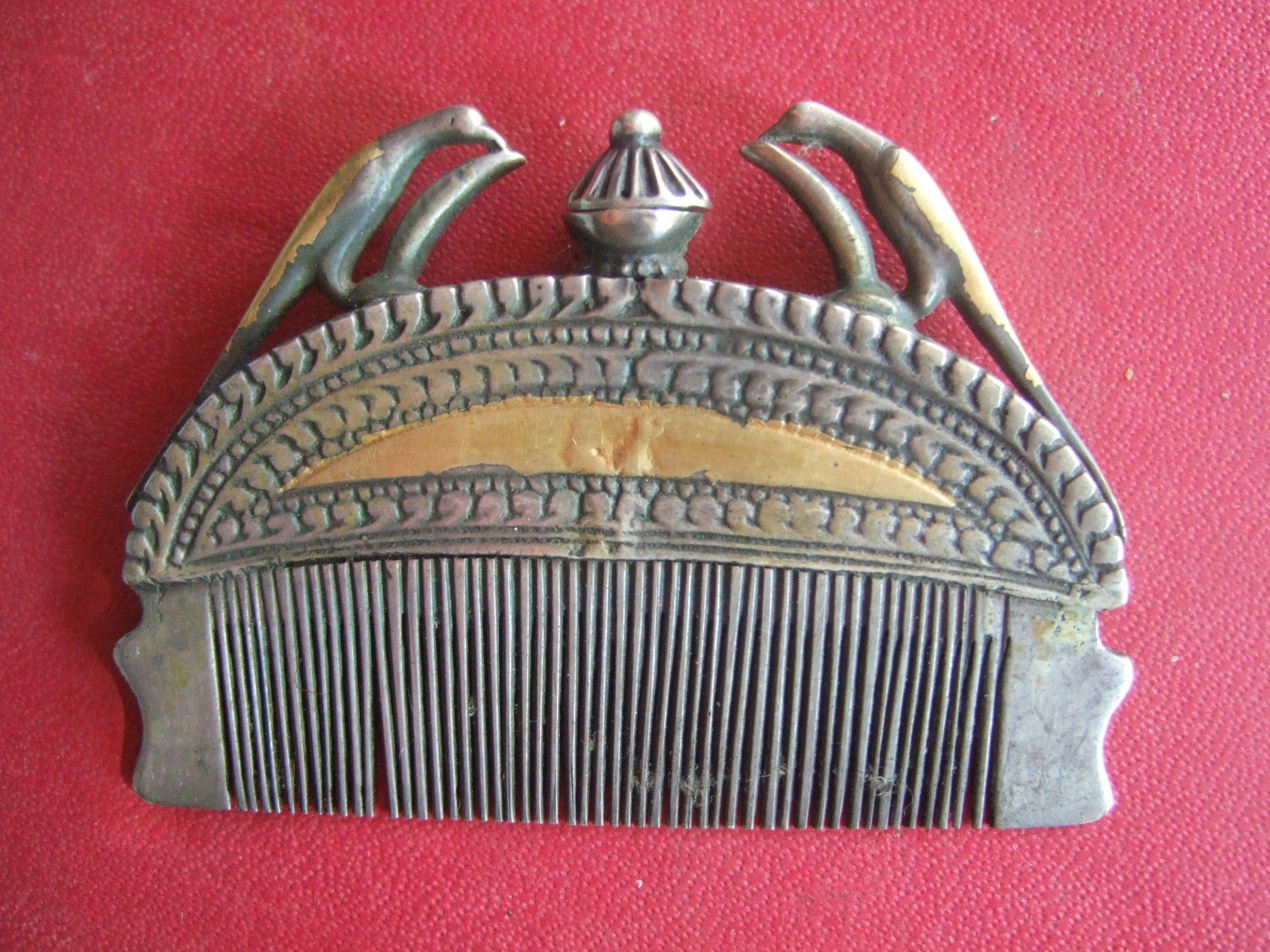
Indian antique comb for keeping hair in place

- Alligator clip
  - Double-prong alligator clip
  - Fully lined alligator clip
  - Partially lined alligator clip
  - Unlined alligator clip (Yoyette clip)
- Auto-clasp barrette
- Bendy or snap clip
- Bow barrette
- Butterfly clip
- Claw clip, hair clamp, or hair claw
- Comb (certain types)
- French barrette
- Ponytail barrette
- Tortoise-shell barrette
- Updo barrette
