= Bobby pin =

Flat, springlike metal hairpin

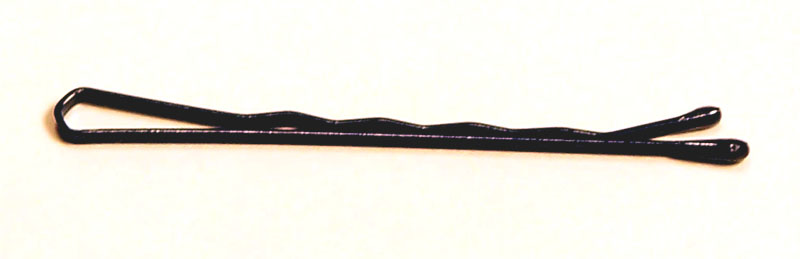
- A plain bobby pin
- Other names: bob pin, kirbigrip, kirby grip, hair grip
- Classification: fastener
- Used with: hair

A bobby pin (US English; known as a kirbigrip, kirby grip or hair grip in the United Kingdom) is a type of hairpin, usually of metal or plastic, used in coiffure to hold hair in place. It is a small double-pronged hair pin or clip that slides into hair with the prongs open and then the flexible prongs close over the hair to hold it in place. They are typically plain and unobtrusively colored, but some are elaborately decorated or jeweled. Bobby pins became popular in the United States in the 1920s to hold the new bobbed hairstyles.

== Uses ==
The main use of a bobby pin is to hold hair in place. In addition to bobbed hair, bobby pins are often used in up-dos, buns, and other hairstyles where a sleek look is desired. To use a bobby pin in hair, hold the hair in the desired position and push the bobby pin (straight side up) into place.

Bobby pins can also be used to hold head coverings such as headbands, bandannas, and yarmulkes in place.

They can be used as decorative elements in hair.

Attributes, such as the clipping action or having a readily available thin, flat piece of metal, mean the bobby pin can be used in other ways as well:

- As makeshift lockpicks, by straightening out two bobby pins to pick the lock.
- They can be used in place of a clothespin (US English, clothes peg in UK) for drying lightweight articles.
- They can be used as clips to hold multi-portion packages closed between uses.
- They can be slipped over book pages as a bookmark.
- Bobby pins are sometimes employed to protect the fingers from burns while smoking the final portion of a marijuana cigarette. In such use, the bobby pin is known colloquially as a "roach clip."
- Bobby pins may be used to thread laces through pre-cut holes in leather and other heavy materials.
- Bobby pins are sometimes used as replacements for cotter pins, especially with cap badges

== Appearance ==
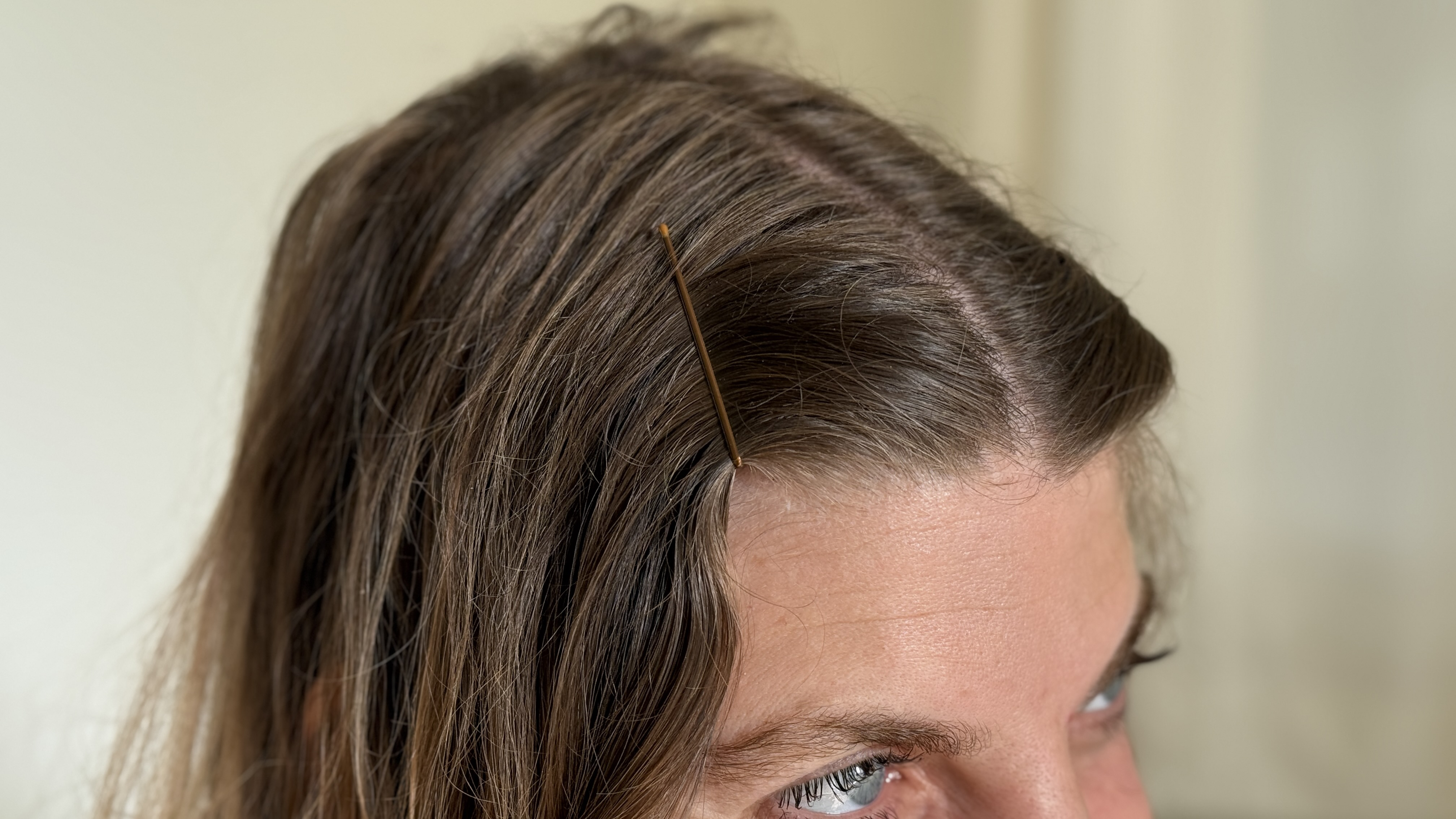
Brown-tinted bobby pin

Like barrettes, decorated bobby pins are sometimes meant to be noticed in hair. A decorated bobby pin can have beads, ribbons, or other details and is usually worn to pull back front sections of hair while looking decorative.

Bobby pins may also be tinted a hair color, such as blonde, brown, or red to blend better into the hair.

Some are made without the wavy rigid side and instead are smooth and curved. They are made this way to help with the grip factor and to stay closer and more tightly attached to the hair that they are pinned to.

Bobby pins may also be padded to avoid creasing the hair.

== History ==
English manufacturers Kirby, Beard & Co. Ltd. of Birmingham made hairpins similar to the bobby pin in 1853, before the bobby pin's invention. The trademarked pin, the "Kirbigrip" was just one of the pins produced by Kirby, the bobby pin closely resembled the kirby grip. The bobby pin was invented by Luis Marcus, a San Francisco–based cosmetics manufacturer, after World War I and came into wide use as the hairstyle known as the "bob cut" or "bobbed hair" took hold. He originally sold two handmade bobby pins for 35 cents. Although Marcus thought about naming the pin after himself, he named them bobby after the bobbed hairstyle. A trademark on the term "bobbie pin" was held for some decades by Smith Victory Corporation of Buffalo, New York. A trademark infringement claim made by Smith Victory Corporation against Procter & Gamble regarding their naming their home permanent product Bobbi was settled in the 1950s by a payment to Smith Victory Corporation by P&G. The term is now in common usage and therefore is no longer a valid trademark.
