= Berkson =

Berkson is a surname. Notable people with the surname include:

- Joseph Berkson (1899–1982), American physicist
  - Berkson's paradox (or Berkson's fallacy)
  - Berkson error model
- Bill Berkson (1939–2016), American poet
- Bradley M. Berkson (born 1963), American defense official

Brandon Berkson - Publisher of Hotels Above Par

== See also ==
- Bergson (disambiguation)
