= Greco-Roman hairstyle =

Ancient hairstyles

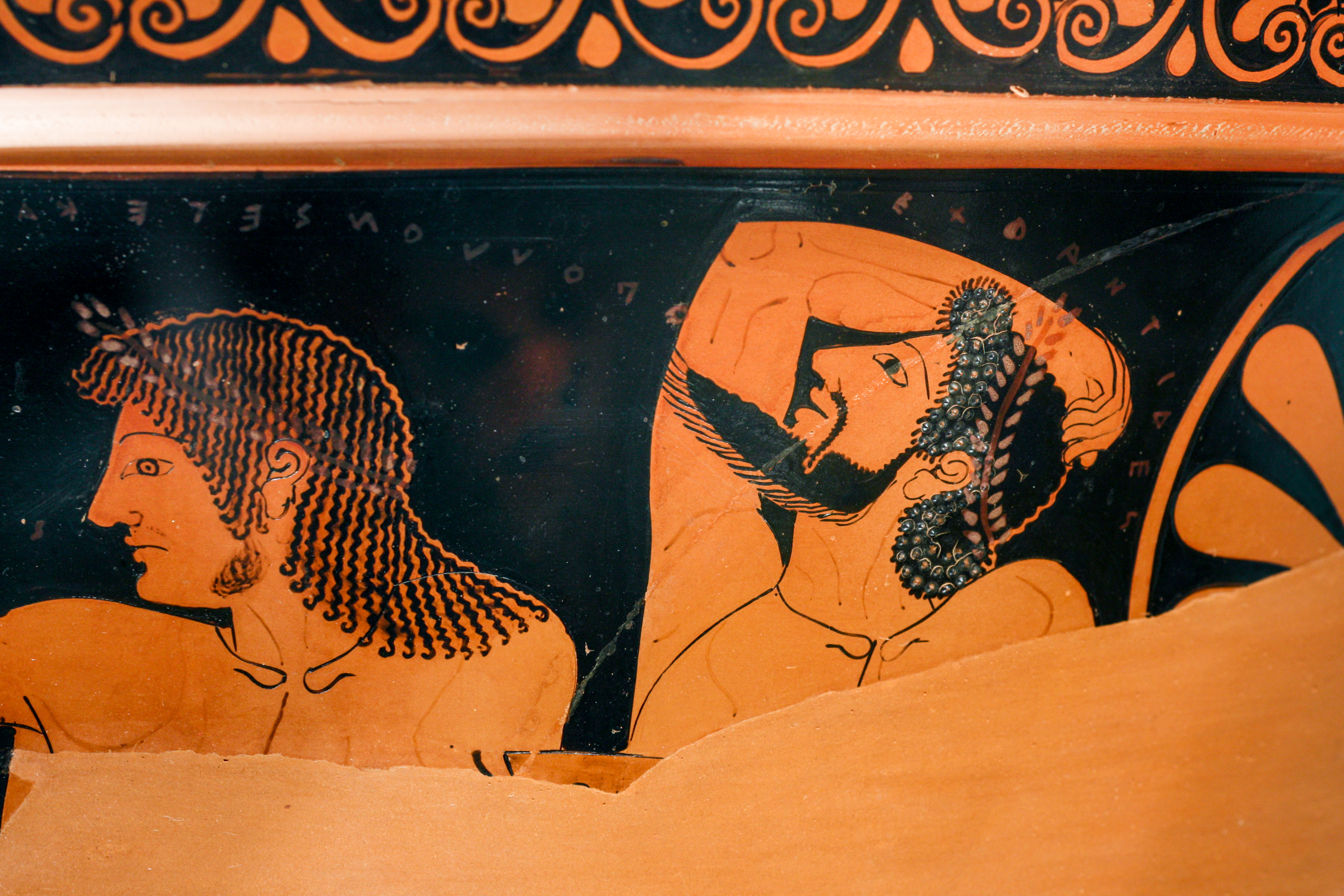
Detail of two men from a drinking party scene on an Attic red-figure calyx-krater (510-500 BC)

In the earliest times the Greeks wore their kómē (κόμη; hair of the head) long, and thus Homer constantly calls them karēkomóōntes (κᾰρηκομόωντες; long-haired).

False hair or wigs were worn by both the Greeks and Romans. Among both peoples in ancient times, the hair was cut close in mourning; among both, the slaves had their hair cut close as a mark of servitude.

== Spartan hairstyles ==
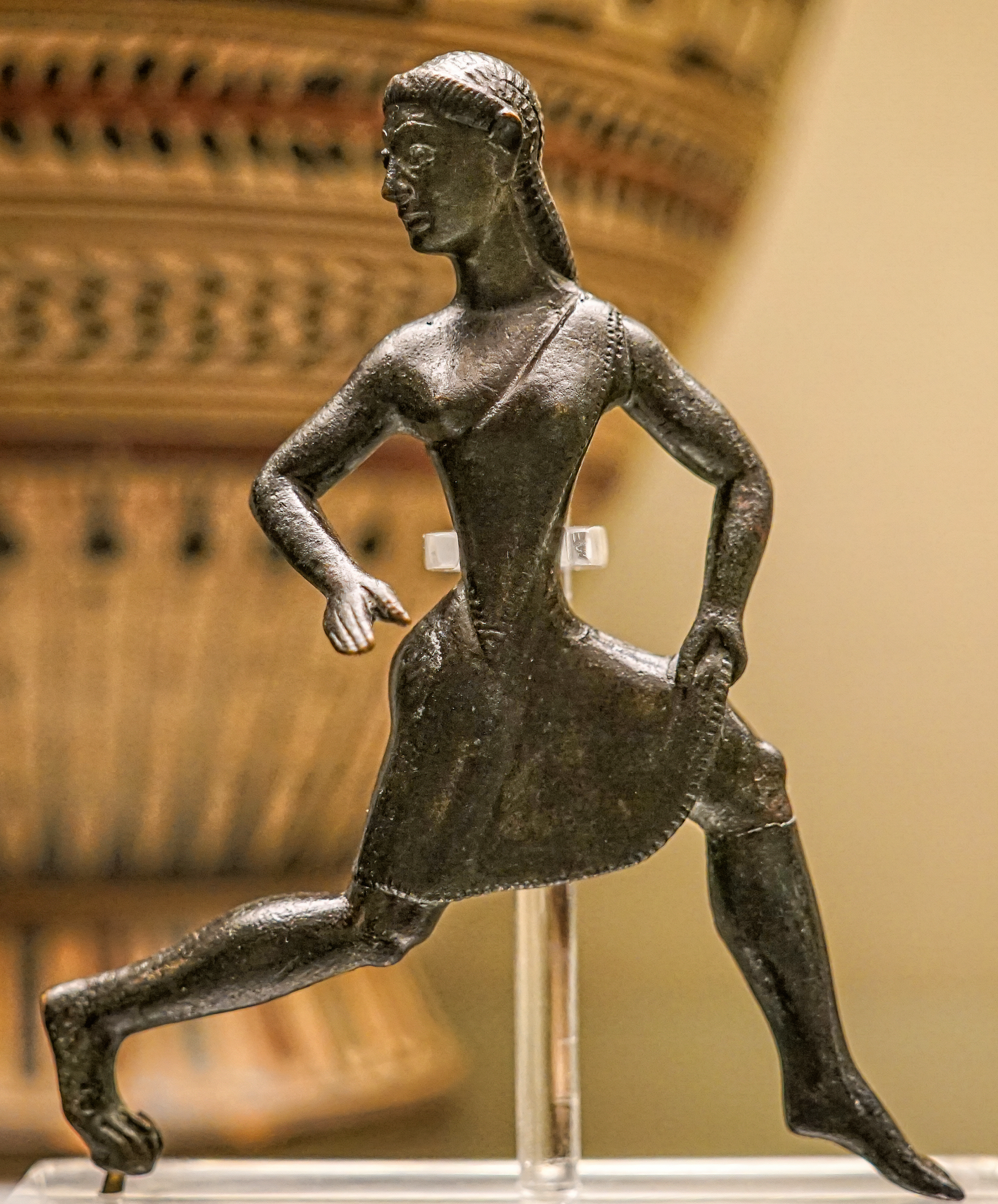
Spartan running girl (520-500 BC) with braids and attired for the Heraean Games, matching the description of Pausanias (British Museum)

This ancient practice was preserved by the Spartans for many centuries. The Spartan boys always had their hair cut quite short (en chroi keirontes), but as soon as they reached the age of puberty, they let it grow long. They prided themselves upon their hair, calling it the cheapest of ornaments (kosmon adapanotatos), and before going to battle they combed and dressed it with special care, an act in which Leonidas and his followers were discovered by the Persian spy before the battle of Thermopylae. It seems that both Spartan men and women tied their hair in a knot over the crown of the head. At a later time, the Spartans abandoned this ancient custom, and wore their hair short, and hence some writers erroneously attribute this practice to an earlier period.

== Athenian hairstyles ==
The custom of the Athenians was different. They wore their hair long in childhood, and cut it off when they reached the age of puberty. The cutting off of the hair, which was always done when a boy became an ephebos, was a solemn act, attended with religious ceremonies. A libation was first offered to Heracles, which was called oinisteria or oinesteria; and the hair after being cut off was dedicated to some deity, usually a river god. It was a very ancient practice to go to Delphi to perform this ceremony, and Theseus is said to have done so.

The ephebi are always represented on works of art with their hair quite short, in which manner it was also worn by the athletes. When the Athenians passed into the age of manhood, they again let their hair grow. In ancient times at Athens the hair was rolled up into a kind of knot on the crown of the head, and fastened with golden clasps in the shape of grasshoppers. This fashion of wearing the hair, which was called krobylos, had gone out just before the time of Thucydides. The Athenian women also wore their hair in the same fashion, which was in their case called korymbos.

== Women's hairstyles ==
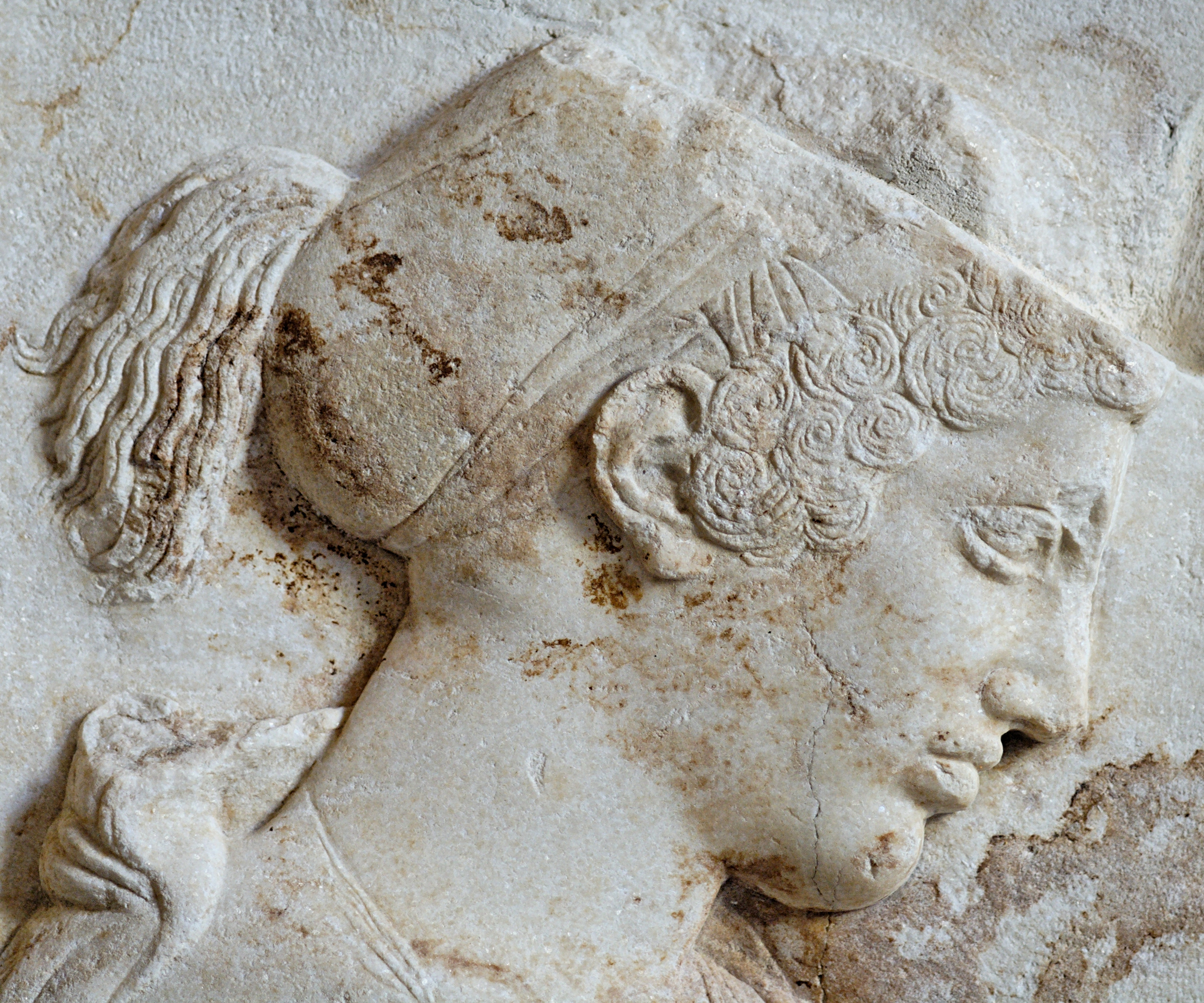
Detail from the funerary stele of Philis, wearing a kekryphalos, from Thasos (ca. 450 BC)

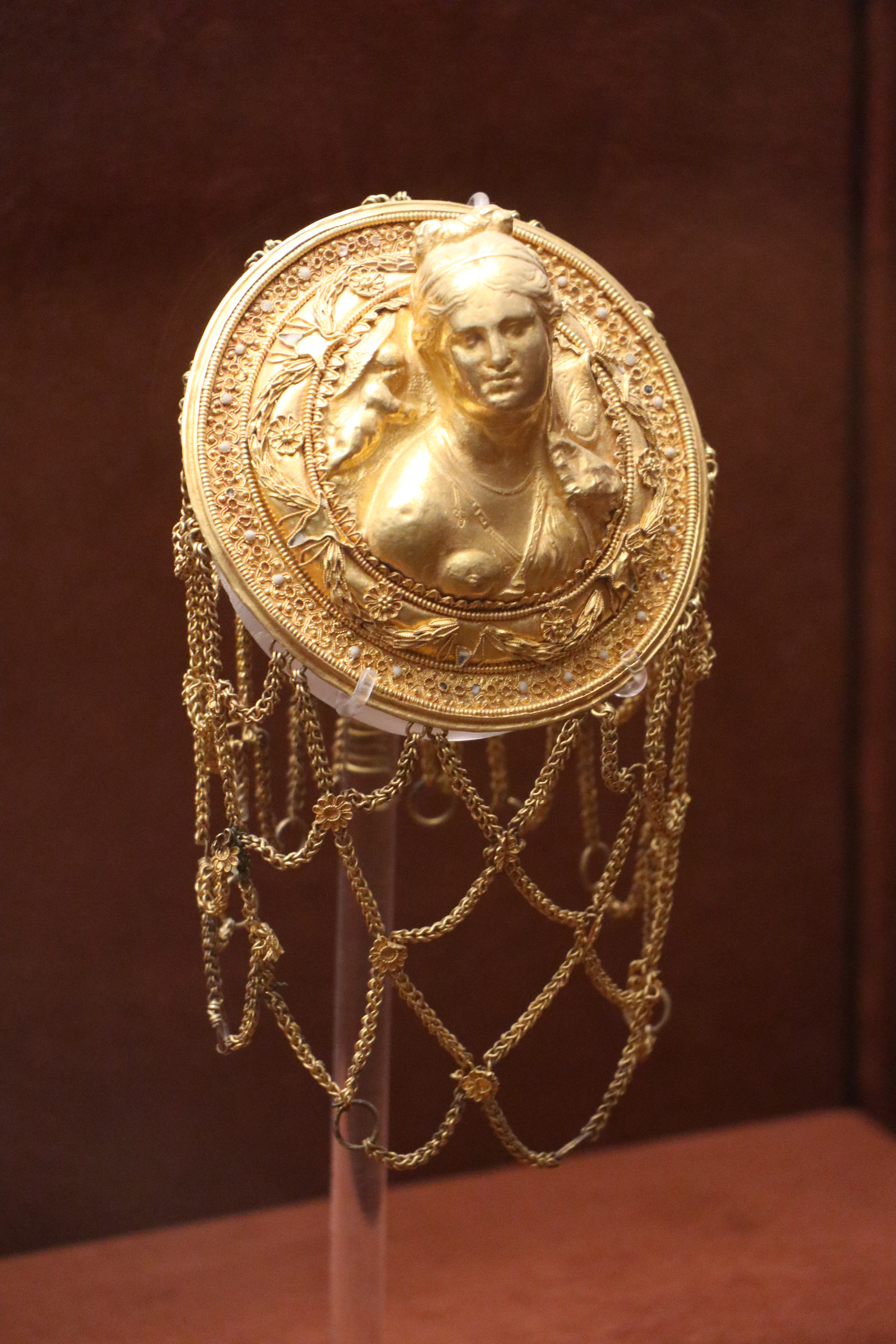
Hairnet (3rd century BC) of gold, garnets, and enamel and a relief bust of Aphrodite

On vases, the heads of women were most frequently shown covered with a kind of band or a coif of net-work. Of these coiffures one was called kredemnos, which was a broad band across the forehead, sometimes made of metal, and sometimes of leather, adorned with gold; to this the name of stlengis was also given, and it appears to have been much the same as the ampyx. But the most common kind of head-dress for women was called by the general name of cecryphalus, and this was divided into the three species of cecryphalus, saccus, and mitra. The kekryphalos, in its narrower sense, was a caul or coif of net-work, corresponding to the Latin reticulum. It was worn during the day as well as the night, and has continued in use from the most ancient times to the present day. It is mentioned by Homer, and is still worn in Italy and Spain.

These hairnets were frequently made of gold threads, sometimes of silk, or the Elean byssus, and probably of other materials, which are not mentioned by ancient writers. The persons who made these nets were called kekryphaloplokoi. Women with this kind of head-dress frequently occur in paintings found at Pompeii, from one of which the preceding cut is taken, representing a woman wearing a Coa Vestis (Coan cloth).

The sakkos and the mitra were, on the contrary, made of close materials. The sakkos covered the head entirely like a sack or bag; it was made of various materials, such as silk, byssus, and wool. Some times, at least among the Romans, a bladder was used to answer the same purpose. The mitra was a broad band of cloth of different colours, which was wound round the hair, and was worn in various ways. It was originally an Eastern head-dress, and may, therefore, be compared to the modern turban. It is sometimes spoken of as characteristic of the Phrygians. It was, however, also worn by the Greeks, and Polygnotus is said to have been the first who painted Greek women with mitrae. The Roman calantica or calvatica is said by Servius to have been the same as the mitra, but in a passage in the Digest they are mentioned as if they were distinct.

== Roman hairstyles ==
Regarding the Romans besides the generic coma we also find the following words signifying the hair: capillus, caesaries, crines, cincinnus and cirrus, the two last words being used to signify curled hair. In early times the Romans wore their hair long, as was represented in the oldest statues in the age of Varro, and hence the Romans of the Augustan age designated their ancestors intonsi and capillati. But after the introduction of barbers into Italy, it became the practice to wear their hair short. The women too originally dressed their hair with great simplicity, but in the Augustan period a variety of different head-dresses came into fashion, many of which are described by Ovid. Sometimes these head-dresses were raised to a great height by rows of false curls.

The dressing of the hair of a Roman lady at this period was a most important affair. So much attention did the Roman ladies devote to it, that they kept slaves especially for this purpose, called ornatrices, and had them instructed by a master in the art. Most of the Greek head-dresses mentioned above were also worn by the Roman ladies; but the mitrae appear to have been confined to prostitutes. One of the simplest modes of wearing the hair was allowing it to fall down in tresses behind, and only confining it by a band encircling the head. Another favourite plan was plaiting the hair, and then fastening it behind with a large pin.

== See also ==
- List of hairstyles
- Caesar cut
- Historical Christian hairstyles
- Roman hairstyles
- Clothing in ancient Greece
- Clothing in ancient Rome
