= Bergsson =

Bergsson is an Icelandic patrynomic surname. Notable people with the surname include:

- Nikolás Bergsson, Icelandic traveller
- Guðbergur Bergsson (1932–2023), Icelandic writer
- Guðni Bergsson (born 1965), Icelandic football player

== See also ==
- Bergson (surname)
