= Bergson (surname) =

Bergson is a surname. Notable people with the surname include:

- Abram Bergson (1914–2003), American economist
- Brian Merritt Bergson (born 1964), American politician
- Henri Bergson (1859–1941), French philosopher
- Herb Bergson, American politician
- Maria Bergson (1914–2009), architect
- Michał Bergson (1820–1898), Polish composer and pianist
- Moina Mathers (born Mina Bergson) (1865–1928), Swiss-born British artist and occultist
- Peter Bergson, pseudonym of Zionist activist Hillel Kook (1915–2001)

Fictional characters:

- Bill Bergson, boy detective created by Swedish writer Astrid Lindgren

== See also ==
- Bergsson
