= Cure =

Substance or procedure that ends a medical condition

A cure is a substance or procedure that resolves a medical condition. This may include a medication, a surgical operation, a lifestyle change, or even a philosophical shift that alleviates a person's suffering or achieves a state of healing. The medical condition can be a disease, mental illness or genetic disorder.

An incurable disease is not necessarily a terminal illness, and conversely, a curable illness can still be fatal.

The cure fraction or cure rate—the proportion of people with a disease who are cured by a given treatment—is determined by comparing disease-free survival in treated individuals against a matched control group without the disease.

Another method for determining the cure fraction and/or "cure time" involves measuring when the hazard rate in a diseased group returns to the hazard rate observed in the general population.

The concept of a cure inherently implies the permanent resolution of a specific instance of a disease. For example, a person who recovers from the common cold is considered cured, even though they may contract another cold in the future. Conversely, a person who effectively manages a disease like diabetes mellitus to prevent undesirable symptoms without permanently eliminating it is not considered cured.

Related concepts with potentially differing meanings include response, remission, and recovery.

== Statistical model ==
In complex diseases like cancer, researchers use statistical comparisons of disease-free survival (DFS) between patients and matched, healthy control groups. This approach equates indefinite remission with a cure. The Kaplan-Meier estimator is commonly used for this comparison.

The simplest cure rate model was published by Joseph Berkson and Robert P. Gage in 1952. In this model, survival at any given time equals the sum of those who are cured and those who are not cured but have not yet died or, in diseases with asymptomatic remissions, have not yet experienced a recurrence of signs and symptoms. Once all non-cured individuals have died or experienced disease recurrence, only the permanently cured population members remain, and the DFS curve becomes flat. The earliest point at which the curve flattens indicates when all remaining disease-free survivors are considered permanently cured. If the curve never flattens, the disease is formally considered incurable (with existing treatments).

The Berkson and Gage equation is $S(t) = p + [(1 -p) \cdot S^*(t)]$

where $S(t)$ is the proportion of people surviving at any given time, $p$ is the proportion permanently cured, and $S^*(t)$ is an exponential curve representing the survival of non-cured individuals.

Cure rate curves can be determined through data analysis. This analysis allows statisticians to determine the proportion of people permanently cured by a treatment and the time needed post-treatment to declare an asymptomatic individual cured.

Several cure rate models exist, including the expectation-maximization algorithm and Markov chain Monte Carlo model. Cure rate models can be used to compare the efficacy of different treatments. Generally, survival curves are adjusted for the effects of normal aging on mortality, especially in studies of diseases affecting older populations.

From the patient's perspective, especially after receiving a new treatment, the statistical model can be frustrating. It may take years to gather enough data to determine when the DFS curve flattens (indicating no further relapses are expected). Some diseases may be technically incurable but require infrequent treatment, making them practically equivalent to a cure. Other diseases may have multiple plateaus, leading to unexpected late relapses after what was initially considered a "cure." Consequently, patients, parents, and psychologists have developed the concept of psychological cure, the point at which the patient decides the treatment is sufficiently likely to be a cure to be considered one. For example, a patient may declare themselves "cured" and choose to live as if the cure is confirmed immediately after treatment.

== Related terms ==
Response
Response is a partial reduction in symptoms following treatment.
Recovery
Recovery is the restoration of health or function. A person who is cured may not be fully recovered, and a person who has recovered may not be cured, as in the case of a person in temporary remission (medicine) or who is an asymptomatic carrier of an infectious disease.
Preventive medicine
Prevention is a way to avoid injury, illness, disability, or disease, and it generally does not help someone already ill (although there are exceptions). For example, many babies and young children are vaccinated against polio and other infectious diseases, preventing them from contracting polio. However, vaccination does not work on individuals who already have polio. Treatment or cure is applied after a medical problem has already begun.
Therapy
Therapy treats a problem and may or may not lead to a cure. In incurable conditions, treatment improves the medical condition, often only while the treatment continues or for a short time after it ends. For example, there is no cure for AIDS, but treatments can slow the harm caused by HIV and extend the affected person's life. Treatments are not always effective. For example, chemotherapy is a cancer treatment, but it may not work for every patient. In easily curable cancers, such as childhood leukemias, testicular cancer, and Hodgkin lymphoma, cure rates can approach 90%. In other forms, treatment may be essentially impossible. A treatment does not need to be successful in 100% of patients to be considered curative; a given treatment may permanently cure only a small number of patients;, but as long as those patients are cured, the treatment is considered curative.

== Examples ==
Cures can include natural antibiotics (for bacterial infections), synthetic antibiotics like sulphonamides or fluoroquinolones, antivirals (for a few viral infections), antifungals, antitoxins, vitamins, gene therapy, surgery, chemotherapy, radiotherapy, and so on. Despite the development of numerous cures, many diseases remain incurable.

=== 1700s ===
Scurvy became curable (and preventable) with vitamin C (e.g., in limes) after James Lind published A Treatise on the Scurvy (1753).

=== 1890s ===
Emil Adolf von Behring and colleagues produced antitoxins for diphtheria and tetanus toxins from 1890. The use of diphtheria antitoxin to treat diphtheria was considered by The Lancet to be the "most important advance of the [19th] Century in the medical treatment of acute infectious disease."

=== 1930s ===
Sulphonamides became the first widely available cure for bacterial infections.

Antimalarials were first synthesized, making malaria curable.

=== 1940s ===
Bacterial infections became curable with the development of antibiotics.

=== 2010s ===
Hepatitis C, a viral infection, became curable through treatment with antiviral medications.

== See also ==
- Eradication of infectious diseases
- Preventive medicine
- Remission (medicine)
- Relapse, the reappearance of a disease
- Spontaneous remission
- Antidote
