= Historical Christian hairstyles =

The hairstyles adopted in the Christian tradition have varied widely over time as well as between locations, social and economic classes, ethnicities, denominations, and the cultures from which Christians have emerged. Among the Clergy and consecrated religious hair styles have also varied between orders and positions with in the church. These variations, along with the regulation of hair styles by church dress code, enabled hair styles to convey information about their wearers role in the church and their relationship to faith.

== Prior to 500 A.D. ==
The paintings in the catacombs suggest that early Christians followed the fashion of their time. By the end of the second century, men’s short hair and women’s braids were curled and arranged in tiers, while for women the hair twined about the head over the brow. Particular locks were reserved to fall over the forehead and upon the temples.

Christian iconography still proceeds in accordance with types created in the beginning of Christianity. Images of Christ retain the long braided locks parted in the middle and flowing to the shoulders. Those of the Blessed Virgin still wear the veil which conceals a portion of the brow and confines the neck. The Orantes, which represent the generality of the faithful, have the hair covered by a full veil which falls to the shoulders. Byzantine iconography differs little as to head-dress from that of the catacombs. Mosaics and ivories portray emperors, bishops, priests and the faithful wearing the hair of a medium length, cut squarely across the forehead.

Women then wore a round head-dress which encircled the face. Emperors and empresses wore a large, low crown, wide at the top, ornamented with precious stones cut en cabochon, and jeweled pendants falling down to the shoulders, such as may be seen in the mosaics of S. Vitalis at Ravenna and a large number of diptychs. The hair of patriarchs and bishops was of medium length and was surmounted by a closed crown or a double tiara.

== Middle Ages ==
The invading barbarians allowed their hair to grow freely, and to fall unrestrained on the shoulders. After the fall of the Merovingians, and while the invaders were conforming more and more to the prevailing Byzantine taste or fashion, they did not immediately take up the fashion of cutting the hair. Carloman, the brother of Charlemagne, is represented at the age of fourteen with his hair falling in long locked tresses behind.

Church councils regulated the head-dress of clerics and monks: according to St. Jerome's testimony, the monks were bearded, and the Vita Hilarionis also states that certain persons considered it meritorious to cut hair each year at Easter. The Statuta antiqua Ecclesiae (can. xliv) forbade them to allow hair or beard to grow. A synod held by St. Patrick (can. vi) in 456 prescribed that the clerics should dress their hair in the manner of the Roman clerics, and those who allowed their hair to grow were expelled from the Church (can. x). The Council of Agde (506) authorized the archdeacon to employ force in cutting the hair of recalcitrants; the Council of Braga (572) ordained that the hair should be short, and the ears exposed. The Fourth Council of Toledo (633) denounced the lectors in Galicia who wore a small tonsure and allowed the hair to grow immoderately, and two Councils of Rome (721 and 743) anathematized those who should neglect the regulations in this matter.

In the ninth century there is more distinction between freemen and slaves, as regards the hair. Henceforth the slaves were no longer shorn save in punishment for certain offences. Under Louis the Débonnaire and Charles the Bald the hair was cut on the temples and the back of the head. In the tenth century the hair cut at the height of the ears fell regularly about the head. At the end of twelfth century the hair was shaven close on the top of the head and fell in long curls behind.

Fashions changed, from hair smooth on the top of the head and rising in a sudden roll in front, a tuft of hair in the form of a flame, or the more ordinary topknot. Not every one followed these fashions.

== Early Modern times ==
The clergy followed with a sort of timidity the fashion of the wig, but, except prelates and court chaplains, they refrained from the over-luxurious models. Priests contented themselves with wearing the wig in folio, or square, or the wig à la Antoine de Sartine. They bared the part corresponding to the tonsure. In the religious orders, the tonsure very early interposed an obstacle to hairstyles, but the tonsure itself was the occasion of many combinations.

== See also ==
- Jesus look
- List of hairstyles
