= Lila Elveback =

American biostatistician

Lillian Rose (Lila) Elveback (December 5, 1915 – April 30, 2004) was an American biostatistician, a professor of biostatistics at the Mayo Clinic Graduate School of Biomedical Sciences, a textbook author, a Fellow of the American Statistical Association, and a founder of the American College of Epidemiology.

== Life ==
Elveback was born on December 5, 1915, in Sidney, Montana. She graduated from the University of Minnesota in 1941, earned a master's degree at Columbia University in 1948, and returned to the University of Minnesota for a doctorate, which she completed in 1955. Her dissertation was Some Aspects of Estimation Problems in Follow-Up Studies in Chronic Disease, and was supervised by Joseph Berkson.

She became a professor of biostatistics at Tulane University before moving in 1961 to the Public Health Research Institute in New York, where she became head of statistics in the division of epidemiology. She worked at the Mayo Clinic from 1965 until her retirement in 1980, and was one of the founding directors of the American College of Epidemiology at its incorporation in 1979.

She died on April 30, 2004, in Rochester, Minnesota.

== Textbook ==
Elveback was the coauthor, with John P. Fox and Carrie E. Hall, of a textbook on epidemiology, Epidemiology: Man and Disease (Macmillan, 1970).

== Recognition ==
In 1970, Elveback was elected as a Fellow of the American Statistical Association "for her outstanding role in advancing the statistical quality of research at the Mayo Clinic by consulting and teaching, and for significant publications in medical statistics".
