= Caesar cut =

Hairstyle

The Caesar cut is a hairstyle with short, horizontally straight cut bangs. The hair is layered to around 2–5 cm (1–2 in) all over. It is named after the Roman Emperor Augustus, whose images frequently depict him wearing his hair in such a manner. This haircut first became fashionable among Western boys and men in the 1980s.

== In popular culture ==
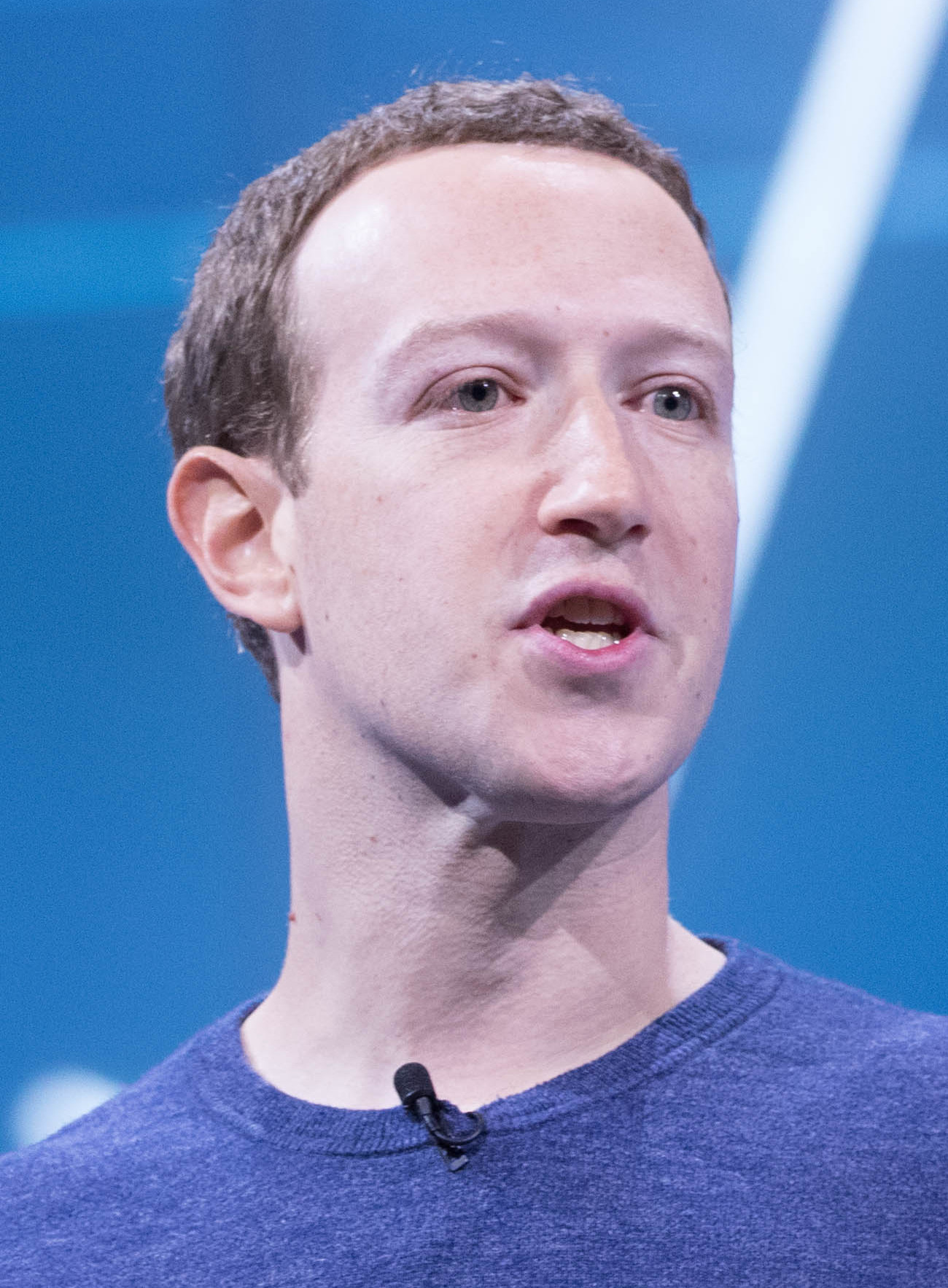
Facebook CEO Mark Zuckerberg with a Caesar cut (2018).

The founder and CEO of Facebook, Mark Zuckerberg, has had a Caesar cut in the past. Since 2024, however, he has worn his hair in a different style.

== See also ==
- Roman hairstyles
- List of hairstyles

== Bibliography ==
- Mansour, David (2005). From Abba to Zoom: A Pop Culture Encyclopedia of the Late 20th Century. Andrews McMeel Publishing. p. 63.
