= Janet Stephens =

American archaeologist and hairdresser

Janet Stephens (née Scott) is an American hairdresser and an amateur hairstyle archaeologist who studies historical hairstyles, aiming to prove that they were not achieved by using wigs, as commonly believed, but by styling the person's own hair.

== Early life ==
Born Janet Scott, Stephens grew up in Kennewick, Washington.

== Interest in ancient hairstyles ==
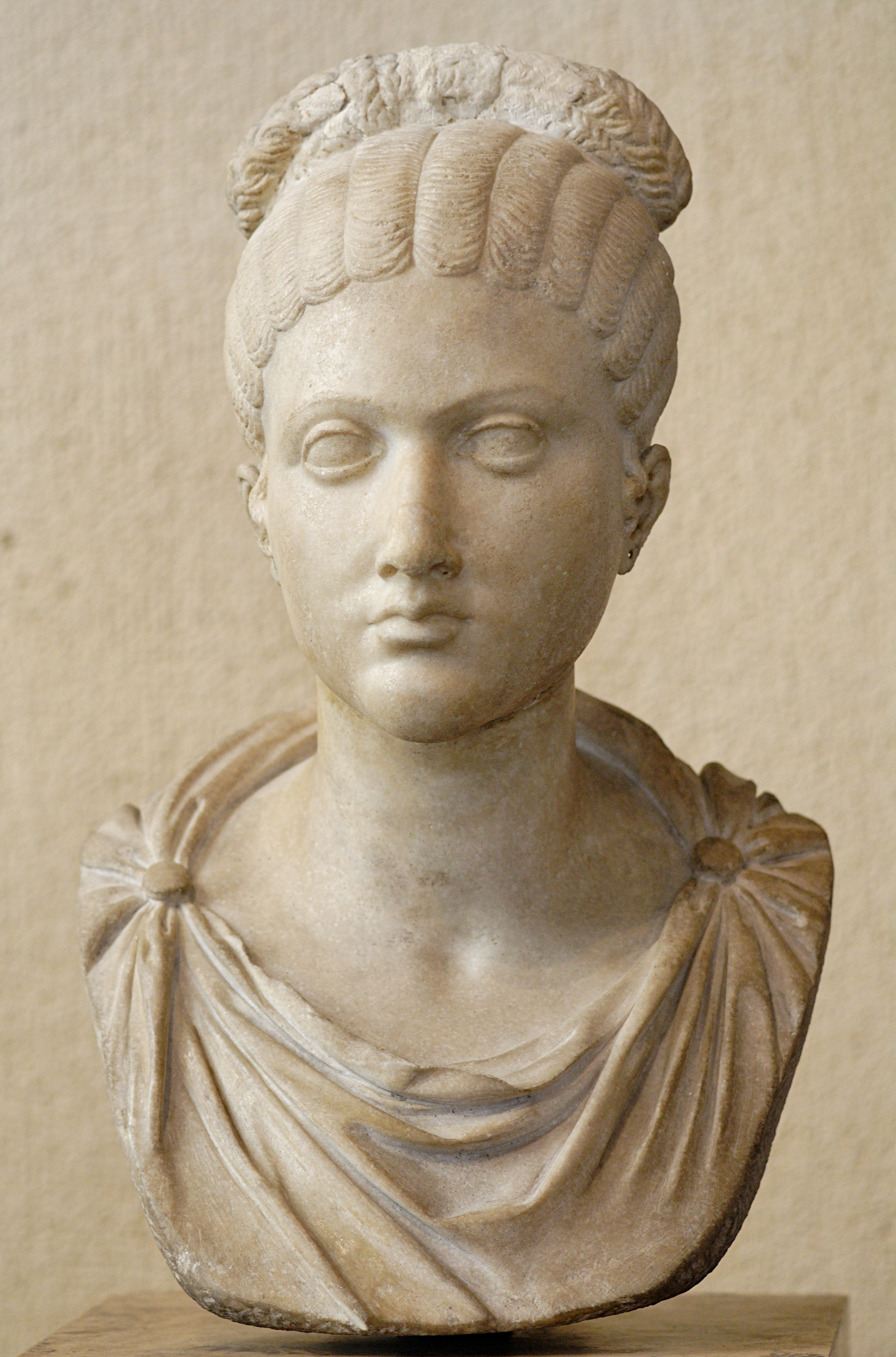
Portrait bust with Roman hairstyle (late first century BC)

She first became interested in ancient hairdressing styles in 2001, when she visited the Walters Art Museum in Baltimore and saw some statues from the Greek and Roman collections that included busts that could be viewed in the round, from all directions. Stephens said,

I had never seen the back of a Roman statue before—they are usually placed high on shelves/pedestal[s] with the backs tight up against a wall. As I circled the portraits I saw the logic of the hairstyles and determined to try some at home.

In research she conducted, she found that scholars mainly believed that elaborate ancient hairstyles, depicted in artworks of the times, were wigs. Believing otherwise because of her observations, Stephens set out to do her own research. In 2005, while studying translations of Roman literature, she realized the Latin term acus, which has several meanings including a "single-prong hairpin" or "needle and thread", was being mistranslated consistently as "single-prong hairpin" in the context of ancient Roman hairdressing. While single-prong hairpins could not have held up the elaborate hairstyles of ancient Rome, a needle and thread could have. In 2008, Stephens published this theory as "Ancient Roman Hairdressing: On (hair) pins and needles" in the Journal of Roman Archaeology, Vol. 21.

In 2012, her video Julia Domna: Forensic Hairdressing was presented in Philadelphia at the annual meeting of the Archaeological Institute of America.

In 2013, she became the first to recreate the hairstyle of the Roman vestal virgins on a modern person.

== Modern hairdressing career ==
Stephens works as a hairdresser at her salon in Baltimore, Studio 921 Salon and Day Spa.

== Selected publications ==
- “Ancient Roman Hairdressing: on (hair)pins and needles” (scroll down to read full text) Journal of Roman Archaeology vol. 21 (2008) 111-133.
- “Recreating the Fonseca Hairstyle” EXARC (the online Journal of Experimental Archaeology) January, 2013. Print version, Exarc Journal Annual digest, 2013.
- Becoming a Blond in Renaissance Italy” Journal of the Walters Art Museum 74 [2019].
