= Berkson error model =

Random error in measurement

The Berkson error model is a description of random error (or misclassification) in measurement. Unlike classical error, Berkson error causes little or no bias in the measurement. It was proposed by Joseph Berkson in an article entitled “Are there two regressions?,” published in 1950.

An example of Berkson error arises in exposure assessment in epidemiological studies. Berkson error may predominate over classical error in cases where exposure data are highly aggregated. While this kind of error reduces the power of a study, risk estimates themselves are not themselves attenuated (as would be the case where random error predominates).
