= Maria Bergson =

American interior designer, industrial designer, and architect

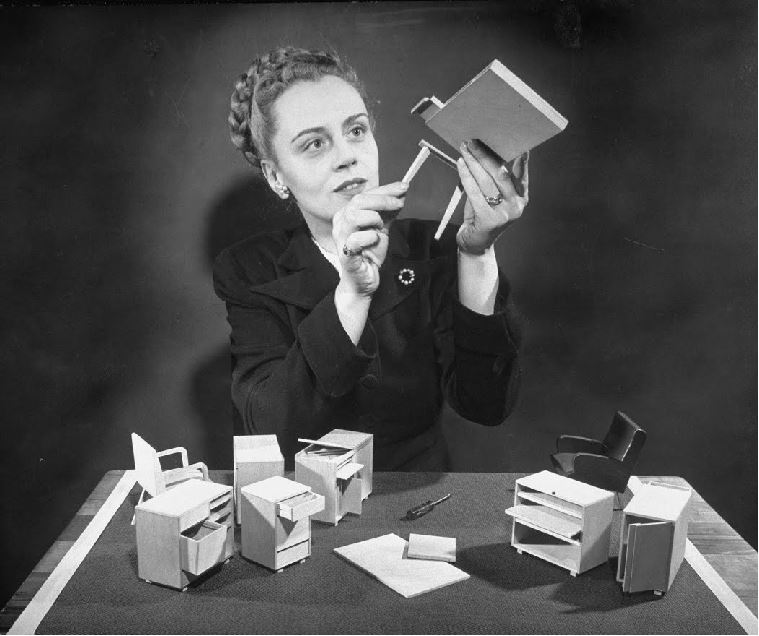
- Born: 1914; Vienna, Austria
- Died: March 19, 2009 (aged 95)
- Occupation: Architect
- Awards: Interior Design Magazine's Hall of Fame (1990)

Maria Bergson (1914 – March 19, 2009) was an American interior designer, industrial designer, and architect best known for revolutionizing commercial office design. She specialized in the design of commercial interiors including offices, banks, hotels, hospitals, stores and the design of furniture and lighting fixtures. She was the first woman designer to be published in Who's Who in America (1956). In 1990, she was inducted in Interior Design magazine's Interior Design Hall of Fame and recognized as a pioneer in contract interiors and speaking out of the importance of professionalism.

== Early life and education ==
Born in Vienna in 1914, she came to America in 1940. She is the daughter of Egon Bergson and Therese Bergson. She was an actress prior to moving to America.

== Work ==
In 1944, Bergson began her career in commercial interior design after working as a secretary at Time, Inc. She spoke openly to executives about how the office set-up could be improved and expressed her opinions based on her first hand experience. When the office moved into a new space, an executive asked for advice from Bergson. Her plans made sense to the executive and asked her to draw up and execute her ideas. Soon after she started her own company, Maria Bergson Associates (MBA) with locations in New York and Los Angeles. She specialized in the design of offices, banks, hotels, hospitals, stores and other commercial interiors, along with the design of accompanying furniture and lighting fixtures. In 1949, she devised 64 square foot partitioned modular work stations that provided a maximum of work surface within arm's reach.

She designed a modular workspace that included ten units that could be rearranged in 46 customizable arrangements to fit an individual's need. The design included compartments for files, books, letters, pencils, cigarettes, and paper clips.

She designed and patented a typewriter desk – United States Patent 2545253. It was filed on April 1, 1948, and published on March 13, 1951.

Her innovations in hospital design giving thought to patients and staff, included private areas for patients and indirect diffused lights were widely adopted in the United States and Sweden.

Her clients included: Time, Inc., American Airlines, Citibank, DuPont, IBM, New York Telephone, the U.S. Post Office, Independence Air, Prudential Insurance Co., U.S. Borax & Chemical Co., Union Bank & Trust Co., and Owens-Corning Fiberglass.

== Exhibits ==
- Office Furniture Design at The Art Alliance, 251 S. 18th Street, Pennsylvania, March 30 – April 25, 1948.

== Awards ==
- Interior Design Magazine's Hall of Fame (1990)
