= Jesus look =

Popularized beard and haircut of Jesus Christ

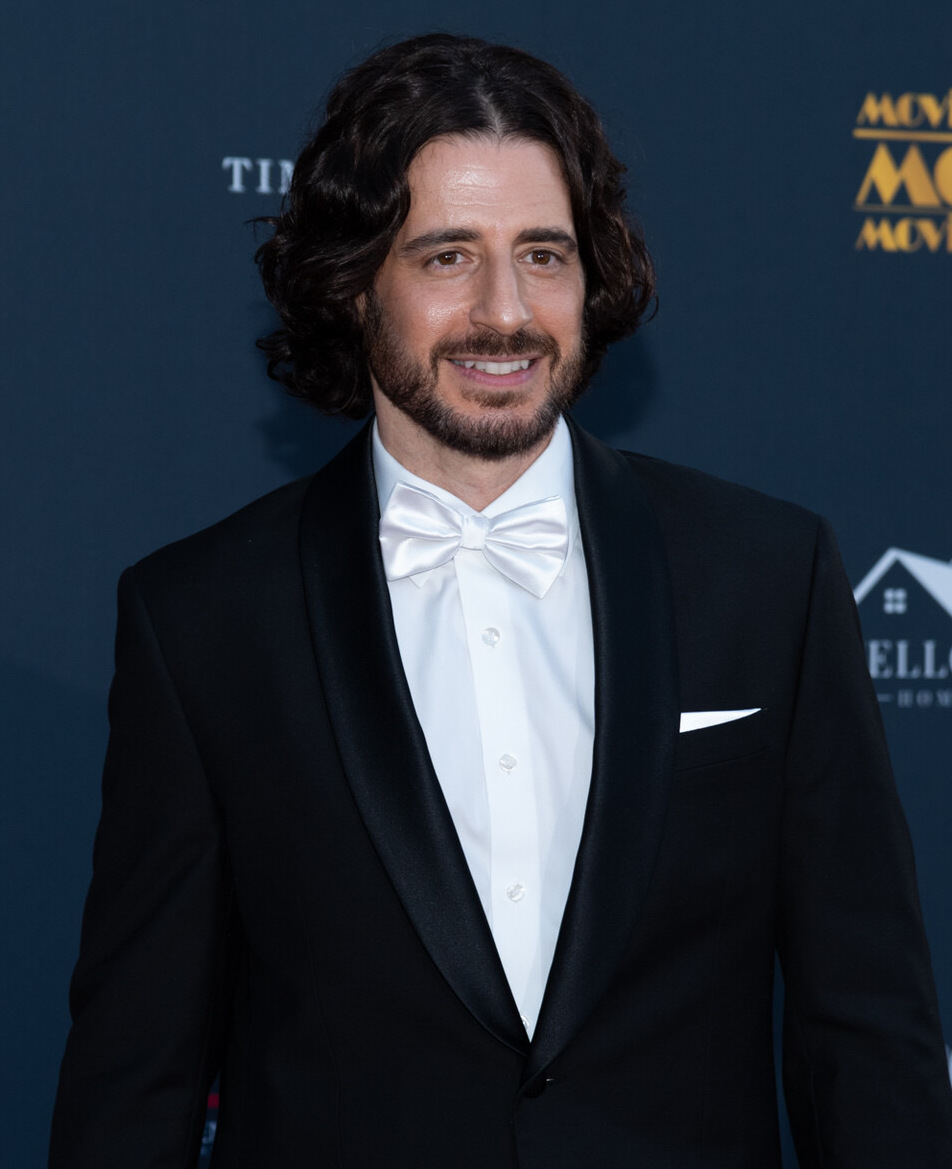
- Jonathan Roumie, from The Chosen, embodies the Jesus look
- Years active: from year 0 to present
- Major figures: Jesus Christ, priests, Jeffrey Hunter, Jim Caviziel, Jonathan Roumie, John Lennon

The Jesus look refers to the popularized physical look of Jesus Christ in art, culture, and media, characterized primarily by long hair, a beard, and often simple robes. This image has become an enduring archetype in Christian iconography and has influenced religious art, popular culture, and societal perceptions of Jesus across centuries. Rooted in early Christian artistic traditions, the "Jesus look" reflects a blend of historical, theological, and cultural developments, particularly within the Catholic Church and Eastern Orthodox Church, where it remains the standard physical appearance of most clergy members.

== Description ==
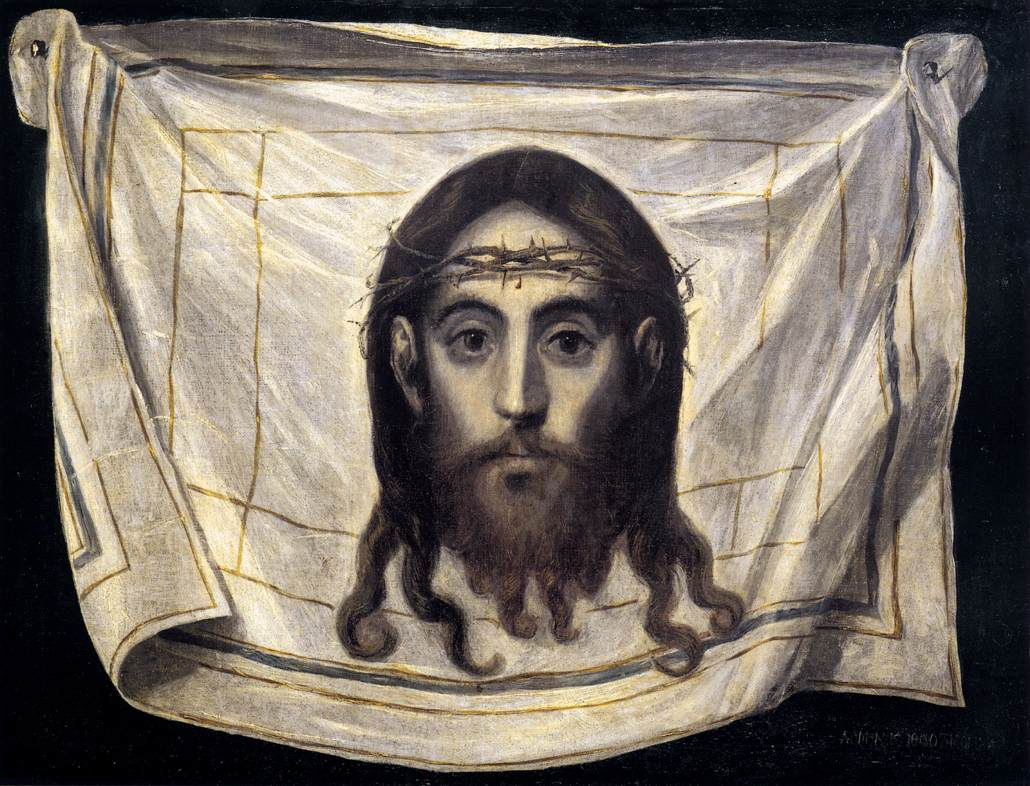
In the movie Silence, Father Rodrigues, who is played by Andrew Garfield, visualizes the face of Christ in the Veil of Veronica form painted by El Greco.

The most distinctive feature of the "Jesus look" is the depiction of Jesus with long, flowing hair, typically parted in the middle or slightly off-center, and a full beard. This hairstyle contrasts with the short hair and clean-shaven or trimmed styles common among Jewish men of first-century Judea, as suggested by historical evidence. The long hair and beard became standardized in Christian art by the 4th century, influenced by Greco-Roman depictions of philosophers, gods, and rulers, such as Zeus or Serapis, symbolizing wisdom and divinity.

In many portrayals, Jesus's hair is depicted as brown or dark brown, occasionally with a slight wave, extending past the shoulders. The beard is usually full and well-grown, reinforcing a perception of masculinity and maturity. These features have remained consistent across centuries, though artistic styles and regional preferences have introduced variations.

== History ==
=== Early Christianity ===
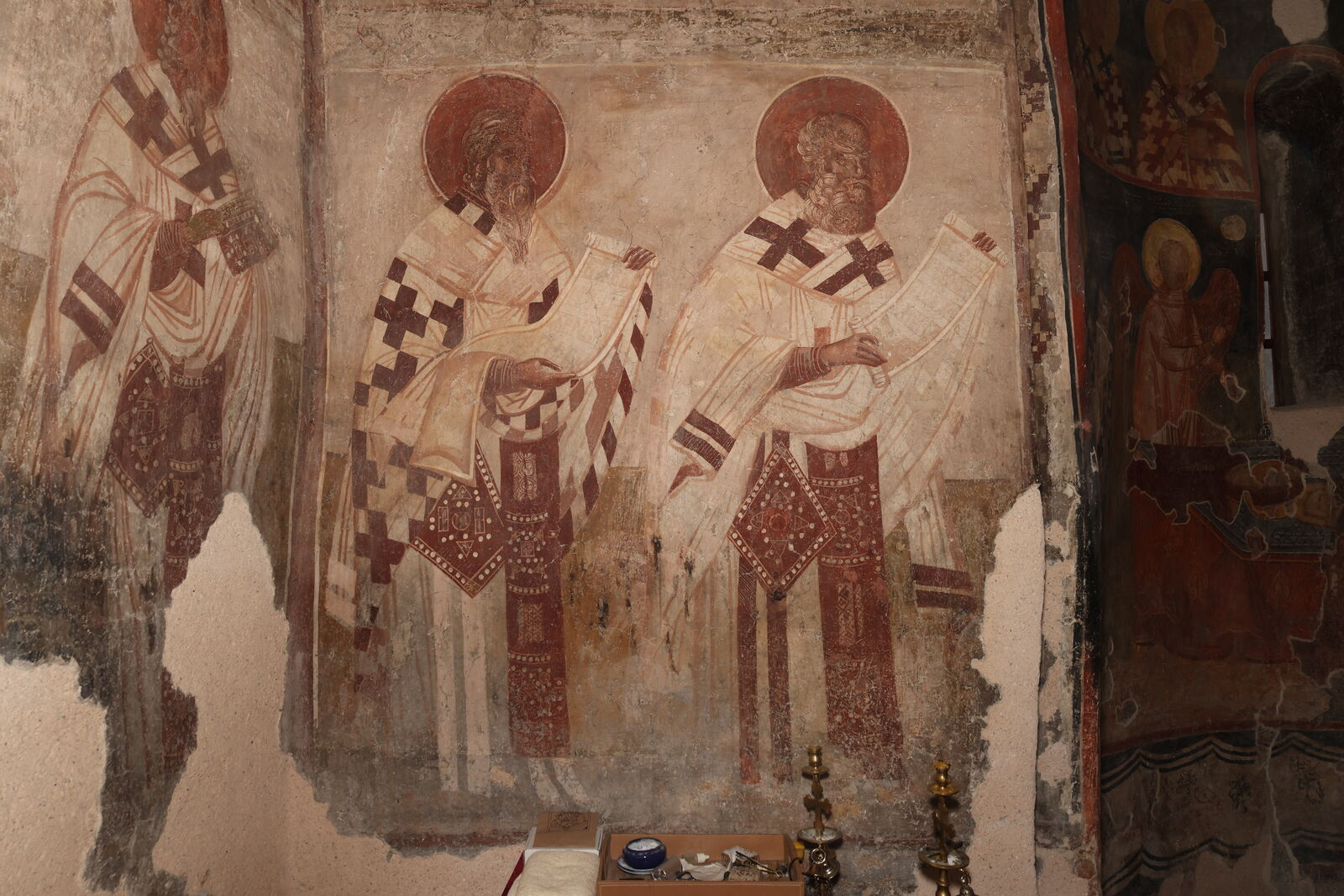
Church Fathers, represented with long beards and long hair, when they are not bald.

As the appearance of Jesus Christ evolved in early Christian art and tradition, the "Jesus look" emerged as a formalized image during the late Roman Empire. Early Christian art, such as the catacomb paintings of the 3rd and 4th centuries, often portrayed Jesus as a youthful, beardless figure in the style of a Roman shepherd or teacher. However, following the Edict of Milan in 313 CE and the subsequent rise of Christian influence, depictions shifted toward the long-haired, bearded figure associated with divine authority and matching the image on the shroud of Turin. This transformation aligned with the Church's efforts to present Jesus as both human and divine, a central tenet of Catholic theology.

=== Canonized by the Councils ===
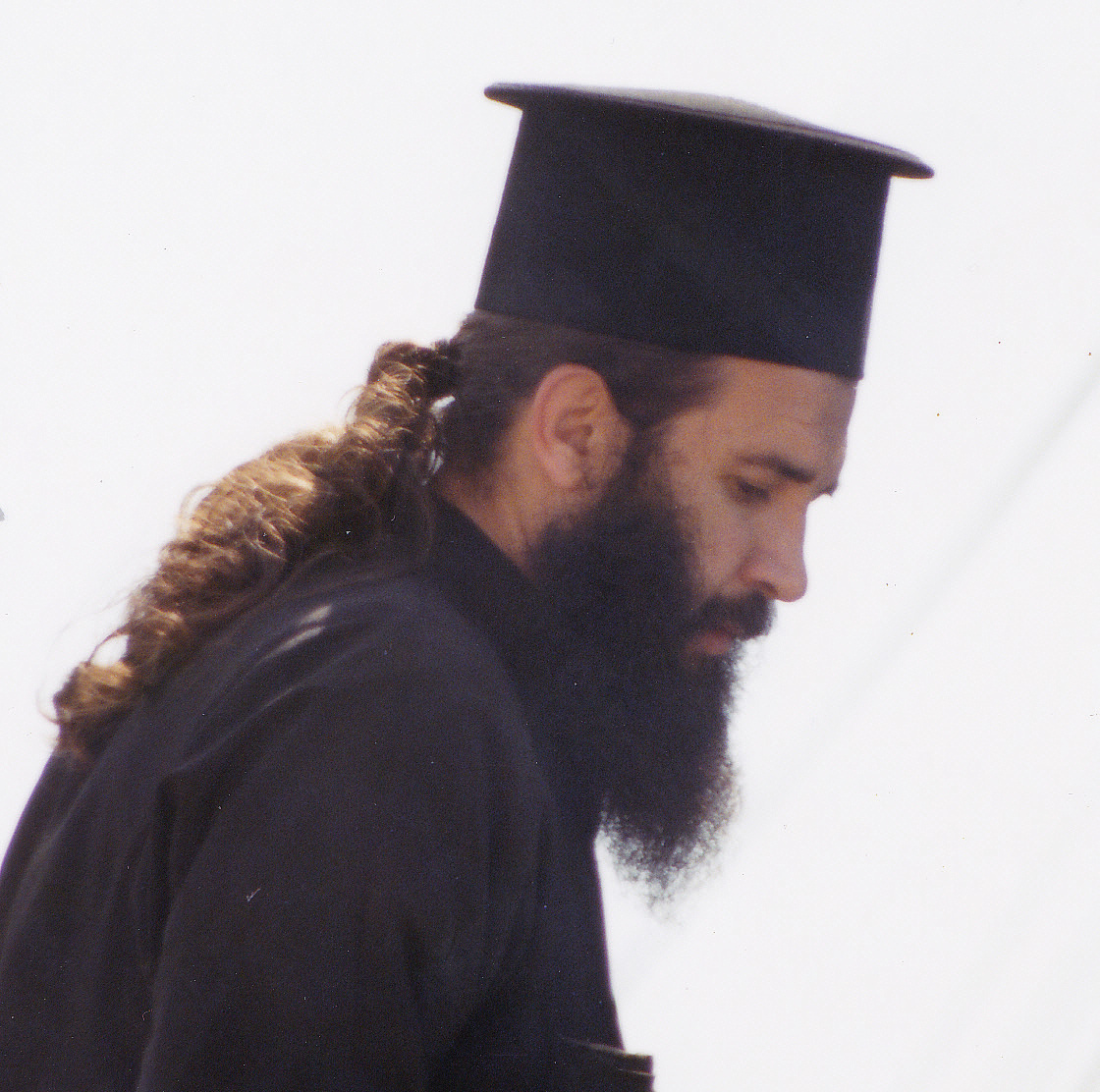
The practice for priests of imitating the Jesus look draws from Old Testament traditions, such as the Nazarite vow (Numbers 6:5), where men consecrated to God refrained from cutting their hair or beards. Priests are seen as continuing this tradition of holiness and separation from worldly vanity.

The "Jesus look" was closely tied to the Byzantine tradition and the development of the icon. The iconic depiction of Jesus as the Christ Pantocrator—almighty ruler—features long hair and a beard, often with a stern expression and a halo. This image emerged in the 4th and 5th centuries, drawing from imperial Roman portraiture and Hellenistic ideals of beauty and power.

First millennium theology places significant emphasis on icons as windows to the divine, and the standardized "Jesus look" became a matter of tradition. The Apostolic Constitutions of the 4th century though not universally binding, advises clergy to avoid cutting their hair or beards as a sign of their sacred role. Canon 27 of the Sixth Ecumenical Council (Trullo, 692 CE) forbids clergy from adopting secular styles, supporting traditional appearances with clothed in black robes, and with long hair. After the Second Council of Nicaea in 787 CE, which affirmed the veneration of icons, the hairstyle and beard were not merely artistic choices but symbols of Christ's eternal nature and continuity with Old Testament prophets. Variations exist, such as the darker, more stylized features in Russian or Ethiopian Orthodox icons, but the core elements of the "Jesus look" remain consistent. As a living icon of Christ; priests would most often emulate this appearance, maintaining long hair and beards as a sign of their spiritual role and connection to Christ's image. This practice remains prevalent in many Orthodox communities, particularly in Greece, Russia, and Eastern Europe, symbolizing humility and devotion.

=== A look cemented in art but lost in practice in the West ===
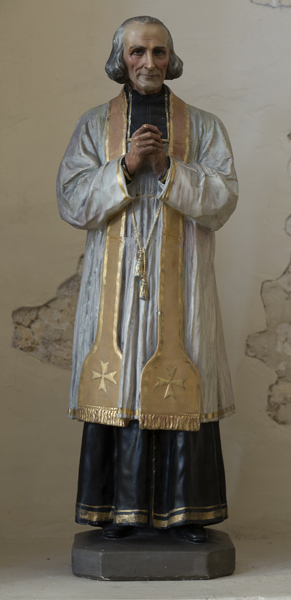
The holy priest of Ars still kept long hair, a priestly tradition which was eventually banned in the seminaries in the 20th century.

By the Middle Ages, the "Jesus look" was cemented in Catholic art through works like the Pantocrator mosaics and paintings by artists such as Giotto and Duccio. The Renaissance further refined this image, with artists like Leonardo da Vinci and Michelangelo emphasizing naturalism while retaining the traditional hairstyle and beard. The Catholic Church endorsed these depictions as tools for teaching the faithful, embedding the "Jesus look" in stained glass, sculptures, and devotional imagery. However, after the 19th century, Catholic clergy faced increasing pressure to adopt short hair and a clean-shaven appearance, reflecting modern ideals of discipline and professionalism. This shift was partly influenced by the Second Vatican Council (1962–1965) and earlier reforms, which distanced priestly appearance from the traditional "Jesus look" in favor of a more contemporary style. The former Code of Canon Law (in 1917) did require clerics to have a simple hairstyle but did not specifically forbid beards; and the current code (issued in 1983) specifies that clerics are to wear suitable ecclesiastical garb but makes no mention of hair or beards.

== Cultural influence ==
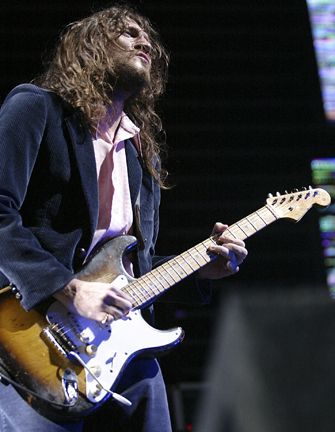
John Frusciante, along with John Lennon or Sam Beam, are considered as rockstars with the Jesus look.

The "Jesus look" has transcended religious art to become a global cultural symbol. In Western popular culture, it has appeared in films, such as The Passion of the Christ (2004) or comedy musicals such as Jesus Christ Superstar, and television, reinforcing the long-haired, bearded image in the public imagination. This depiction has also influenced countercultural movements, notably the 1960s hippie movement and rock bands, where long hair and beards were adopted as signs of peace and nonconformity, often explicitly linked to Jesus. Thus, for example, Jack Broadbent is an English blues guitarist who has been described as having the 'Jesus' look as well as actor Jared Leto.

"The dirty-blonde shoulder-length hair and beard are just his way of rebelling against his Mormon parents in Provo, who send him weekly links to articles about BYU's honour code and the virtues of clean-shaven faces."

The image has also sparked debate. Some scholars argue it reflects a Eurocentric bias, distancing Jesus from his Middle Eastern origins. Others see it as a testament to the adaptability of Christian imagery across cultures. In Indonesia in March 2025, insulting the look of Jesus and suggesting that Jesus should cut his hair was condemned as blasphemy. Today, the "Jesus look" remains a powerful identifier, appearing in everything from religious merchandise to satirical art.

== See also ==
- Christian iconography
- Depiction of Jesus
- Christ Pantocrator
- Cultural depictions of Jesus
