= Joseph Berkson =

- Born: 14 May 1899; New York City
- Died: 12 September 1982 (aged 83)
- Education: Johns Hopkins University
- Known for: Berkson's paradox Berkson error model
- Scientific career
- Fields: Biostatistics
- Workplaces: Mayo Clinic
- Doctoral advisor: Lowell Reed
- Doctoral students: Lila Elveback

Joseph Berkson (14 May 1899 – 12 September 1982) was an American biostatistian, who is best known for having identified a source of bias in observational studies caused by selection effects. This bias eventually became known as Berkson's paradox.

Berkson was trained as a physicist (BSc 1920, College of City of New York (CCNY), M.A., 1922, Columbia), physician (M.D., 1927, Johns Hopkins), and statistician (Dr.Sc., 1928, Johns Hopkins).

== Works and views ==
In 1950, as Head (1934–1964) of the Division of Biometry and Medical Statistics of the Mayo Clinic, Rochester, Minnesota, Berkson wrote a key paper entitled Are there two regressions? In this paper Berkson proposed an error model for regression analysis that contradicted the classical error model until that point assumed to generally apply and this has since been termed the Berkson error model. Whereas the classical error model is statistically independent of the true variable, Berkson's model is statistically independent of the observed variable. Carroll et al. (1995) refer to the two types of error models as follows:

- error models including the Classical Measurement Error models and Error Calibration Models, where the conditional distribution of W given (Z, X) is modeled — use of such a model is appropriate when attempting to determine X directly, but this is prevented by various errors in measurement.
- regression calibration models (also known as controlled-variable or Berkson error models), where the conditional distribution of X given (Z, W) is modeled.

Berkson is also widely recognised as the key proponent in the use of the logistic in preference to the normal distribution in probabilistic techniques. He is credited with the introduction of the logit model in 1944, and with coining this term. The term was borrowed by analogy from the very similar probit model developed by Chester Ittner Bliss in 1934.

Berkson was a prominent opponent of the idea that cigarette smoking causes cancer. In the 1957 Liggett & Myers annual report, he was quoted as saying "the evidence, taken as a whole, does not establish, on any reasonable scientific basis, that cigarette smoking causes lung cancer." Following the issuance of the famous report Smoking and Health: Report of the Advisory Committee to the Surgeon General of the Public Health Service, he was quoted in Life magazine as saying it was "very doubtful that smoking causes cancer of the lung."

== Bibliography ==
- Berkson J. Limitations of the Application of Fourfold Table Analysis to Hospital Data. Biometrics Bulletin. 1946;2(3):47–53. PMID 21001024.
- Berkson J. Limitations of the Application of Fourfold Table Analysis to Hospital Data. International Journal of Epidemiology. 2014;43(2):511–515. DOI: 10.1093/ije/dyu022. PMID 24585734. Reprint with restrictions.
