= Ghazala (name) =

Ghazala is a feminine given name of Arabic origin. Notable people with the name include:

== Given name ==
- Ghazala (died 696), leader of the Kharijite movement
- Ghazalah Alaqouri (born 1973), Libyan powerlifter
- Ghazala Anjum, Pakistani politician
- Ghazala Butt (born 1960), Pakistani actress
- Ghazala Gola (born 1952), Pakistani politician
- Ghazala Hashmi (born 1964), American politician
- Ghazala Kaifee (born 1960), Pakistani actress
- Ghazala Khan, multiple people
- Ghazala Lari, Indian politician
- Ghazala Rahman Rafiq, Pakistani educationist
- Ghazala Rafique (1977–1939), Pakistani actress
- Ghazala Saad Rafique, Pakistani politician
- Ghazala Saifee, Pakistani politician
- Ghazala K. Salam, Indian-American Muslim activist
- Ghazala Shaheen (born 1981), Pakistani politician
- Ghazala Sial (born 1966), Pakistani politician
- Ghazala Siddique (born 1994), Pakistani badminton player
- Ghazala Wadood, Pakistani badminton player
- Ghazala Yasmeen (born 1948), Pakistani newscaster
