= Ghazala K. Salam =

Indian-American activist and philanthropist

- Education: Florida International University, MS
- Occupations: Political and Social Advocate; Community and Government Relations
- Website: ghazalasalam.com

Ghazala K. Salam [pronounced as G-ah-ZAA-L-aa-] is an Indian born American Muslim activist and philanthropist.

== Early life and education ==
Salam migrated to the United States during her fifth grade year with her parents. Her paternal ancestors migrated to India from the Afghan-Persian region, known as the Pashtuns, historically known by the exonyms Afghans. Her name Ghazala is of Arabic origin, meaning the Gazelle.

Salam's family settled in Philadelphia, where she attended Catholic, then public school. When she was 15, her parents decided to move to South Florida to be closer to their extended family who had also migrated from India.

After raising two children and running her family-owned business for 14 years, Salam went back to school in her 40s. She followed her passion for food and entertainment, to gain a Master of Science degree in Hospitality Management at Florida International University (FIU).

== Career ==
As the president of the American Muslim Democratic Caucus, she is focused on empowering her community through educational events, voter initiatives, and leadership development for the purpose of creating a community of equitable, knowledgeable and motivated citizens. As a certified Government Relations professional her work is geared toward education of lawmakers and stakeholders of the sometimes hidden and damaging ramifications of legislation.

Salam also serves as the co-chair of the Annual Florida Muslim Capitol Day, a statewide initiative to empower Florida Muslim communities and youth, to connect and have a voice in Tallahassee where policies and laws are passed.

Her background in grassroots activism has led her to work with the League of Women Voters in Broward.

Salam's role as the Chair of the Broward Commission on the Status of Women is instrumental in promoting women's rights, documenting the reality of women's lives throughout Broward County, and shaping County wide standards on gender equality and empowerment of women; she has established a model women 4 women forum, bringing together women from across the county to have open dialogue on issues that impact their lives in order to identify gaps and find solutions that can positively affect women in Broward County.

As the Co-chair of the Human Relations Committee for the Broward County School Board, she promotes diversity, inclusive educational opportunities from an early age, which is crucial for achieving the district's educational and civic character education goals for all the children. Salam advocates for cross–cultural understanding, breaking down racial and other stereotypes and eliminating bias and prejudice.

Salam is the founder of the American Muslim Democratic Caucus This is evident in the 10 out of 15 female majority board of the American Muslim Democratic Caucus of Florida.

== Democratic advocacy ==
Salam has served at the local, state, and national levels in building bridges between the American Muslim Community and the broader community. A decade after the 9/11 attacks, Salam felt the exaggerated fear, hatred and hostility towards Islam and Muslims like never before. A perpetual negative stereotyping resulting from political and media bias, discrimination and the marginalization and exclusion of Muslims from social, political and civic discourse moved her to take action.

Salam's work has notably countered misconceptions about Islam and American Muslims while continuing to advocate for civil liberties, religious and civil rights for all. As a progressive American Muslim, Salam is uniquely positioned to bridge gaps of understanding and collaboration in both the Muslim community and the non-Muslim community. Within the Muslim community, Salam works to educate the community on why it's important to have a collective voice, the value of engaging in the political process, to get out and vote. This comes from her belief that for people to effect change in society they must have the means to collectively advocate for that change.

== Contribution to the progress and freedom of women ==
Salam has been a strong advocate of educating Muslims and non-Muslims alike on the rights of women in Islam. Lack of understanding and education has led to a great deal of misrepresentation of women's rights. With the belief that injustice anywhere is a threat to justice everywhere, and the understanding that women's issues are linked to many broader problems of social justice, Salam believes that human rights for all are indivisible, and she works hard to give active support to the common cause of equity for all, especially those who suffer discrimination and deprivation.

Salam's own inspirations are the women's suffrage and civil rights movements, which have taken her on a social movement that challenges aspects of traditional gender norms and the larger public knowledge about her faith as a Muslim woman. She currently works on advancing moral and political issues surrounding women's equity, championing the Convention on the Elimination of All Forms of Discrimination against Women (CEDAW), in Broward County.

== Philanthropic work ==
She has chaired the Day of Dignity charitable event in South Florida, working closely with Palm Beach County Homeless Coalition and over 40 other organizations to provide health and human services to marginalized families and homeless individuals in South Florida. Since 2011, the Day of Dignity has served over 4000 individuals in need, with free haircuts, flu shots, HIV screenings, blood pressure and other healthcare screenings, non-perishable groceries, hot meals, bicycles for kids and adults, school supplies, toiletries, and many more.

== Islamic views ==
Salam is a spiritual person attributing her views on faith to her great grandmother, and by extension, her own descent from Sufism. She has liberal world views and tends to accept things in an open, broad-minded way, giving people the benefit of doubt; understanding the views of others. Her belief is that we are all equal in our humanness, humanity and human dignity.

== Selected awards ==
- First American Muslim Women to be inducted to the Broward Women's Hall of Fame in 2016.
- Recipient of the 2015 Florida Commission on Status of Women Achievement Award, recognized as a meritorious woman for her dedication to improving the lives of Florida women and serving as a positive role model for women and girls.
- Recipient of the Achievement for Excellence in Community Service Award Al-Hikmat Institute, May 2015.
