= Ghazal (disambiguation) =

A ghazal is a poetic form with couplets that share a rhyme and a refrain.

Ghazal or Gazal may also refer to:

== Entertainment ==
- Gazal (1964 film), an Indian Urdu-Hindi film
- Ghazal (1975 film), an Iranian film
- Ghazal (1993 film), an Indian Malayalam film
- Ghazal (band), a world fusion group

== People ==
=== Surname ===
- Albert Gazal (born 1950), Israeli footballer
- Ali Ghazal (born 1992), Egyptian footballer
- Edwin (musician) (born 1968 as Edwin Ghazal), Canadian musician
- Majd Eddin Ghazal (born 1987), Syrian high jumper
- Ravid Gazal (born 1982), Israeli footballer
- Salim Ghazal (1931–2011), Lebanese Melkite bishop

=== Given name ===
- Ghazal El Jobeili (born 1986), Lebanese swimmer
- Ghazal Omid (born 1970), Iranian-Canadian author
- Ghazal Srinivas (born 1966), Indian singer

== See also ==
- Ghazala Khan (disambiguation)
- Ayn Ghazal (village), depopulated Palestinian village
- Ayn Ghazal (archaeological site), Neolithic archaeological site in Jordan
- al-Ghazal, 9th-century Andalusi diplomat
- Gazel, a Turkish form of improvised solo singing
