= Hairstyle =

Style of hair, usually on the human head

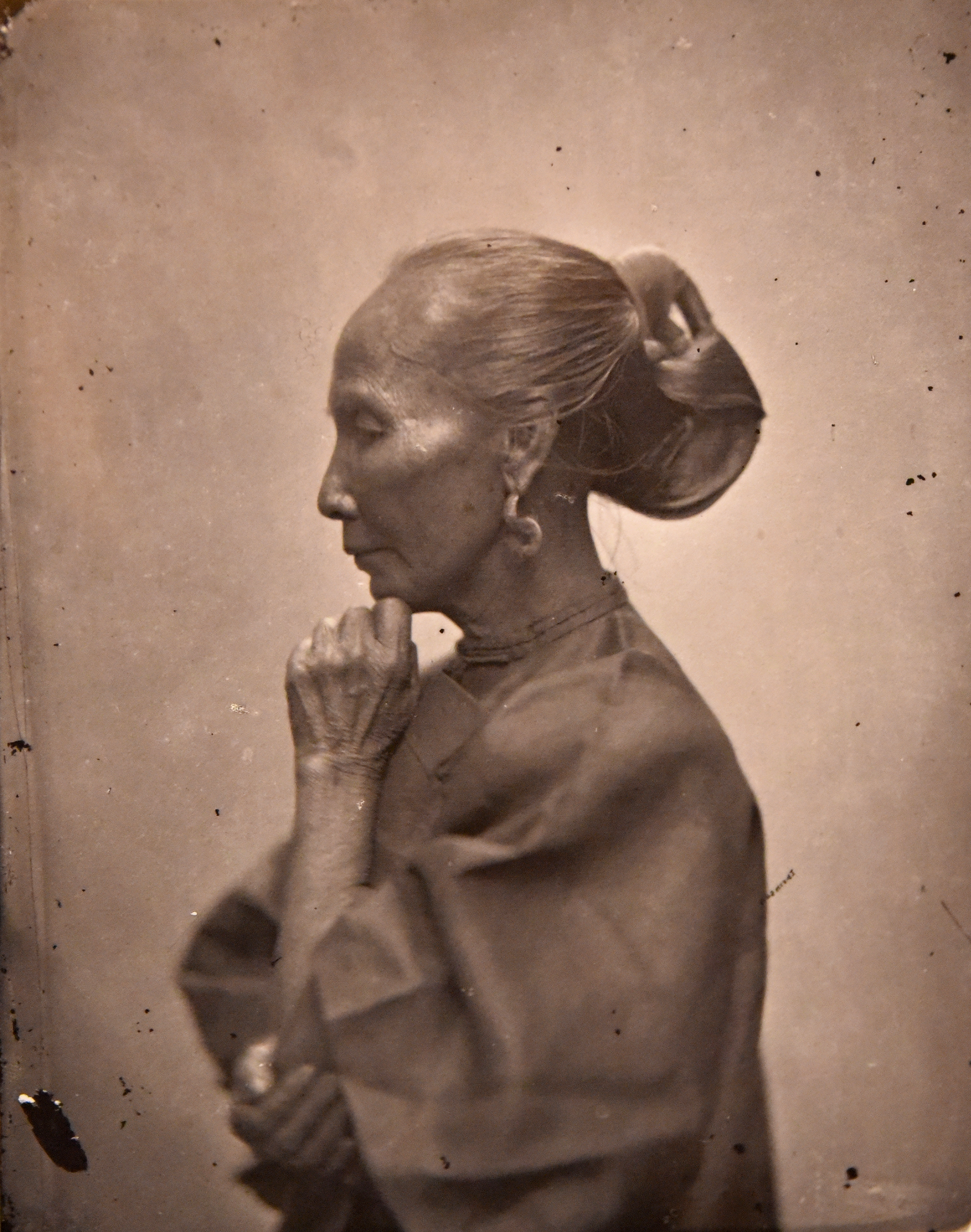
Chinese woman with an elaborate hair style, 1869

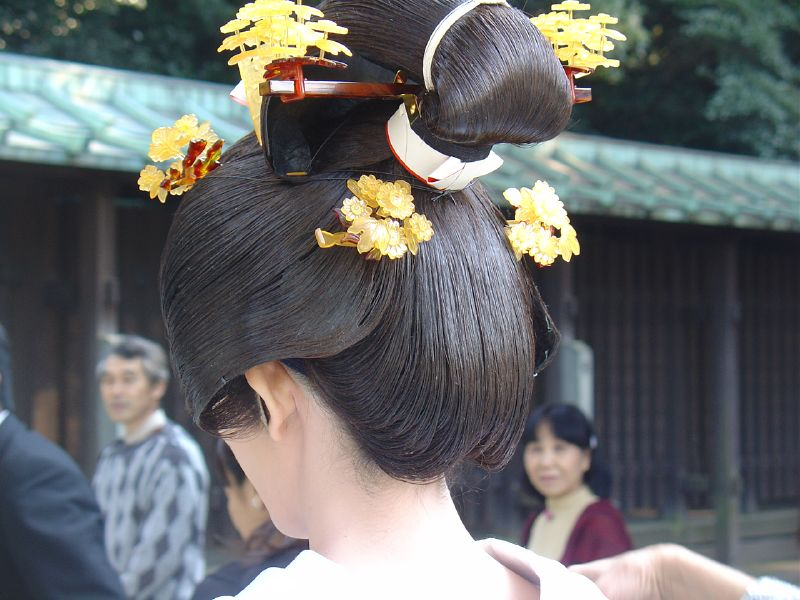
Traditional hairstyle of a Japanese bride

A hairstyle, hairdo, haircut, or coiffure refers to the styling of hair, usually on the human head but sometimes on the face or body. Hair styling can be considered an aspect of personal grooming, fashion, and cosmetics, although practical, cultural, and popular considerations also influence some hairstyles. Hairstyles may involve altering the length, texture, shape, or arrangement of hair through various styling techniques.

The oldest known depiction of hair styling is hair braiding, which dates back about 30,000 years. Women's hair was often elaborately and carefully dressed in special ways, though it was also frequently kept covered outside the home, especially for married women.

== Prehistory and history ==
People's hairstyles are largely determined by the fashions of the culture they live in. Hairstyles have played an important role in human culture for centuries, serving not only as a form of personal appearance but also as a way to represent cultural traditions, social roles, identity, and changing fashion trends. Hairstyles are markers and signifiers of social class, age, marital status, racial identification, political beliefs, and attitudes about gender.

Some people may cover their hair totally or partially for cultural or religious reasons. Notable examples of head covering include women in Islam who wear the hijab, married women in Haredi Judaism who wear the sheitel or tichel, married Himba men who cover their hair except when in mourning, Tuareg men who wear a veil, and men and women in Sikhism who wear the dastar, whether baptized or not, as a symbol of their faith and cultural identity.

=== Paleolithic ===
The oldest known reproduction of hair braiding dates back about 30,000 years: the Venus of Willendorf, now known in academia as the Woman of Willendorf, of a female figurine from the Paleolithic, estimated to have been made between about 28,000 and 25,000 BC. The Venus of Brassempouy is approximately 25,000 years old and possibly depicts hairstyling.

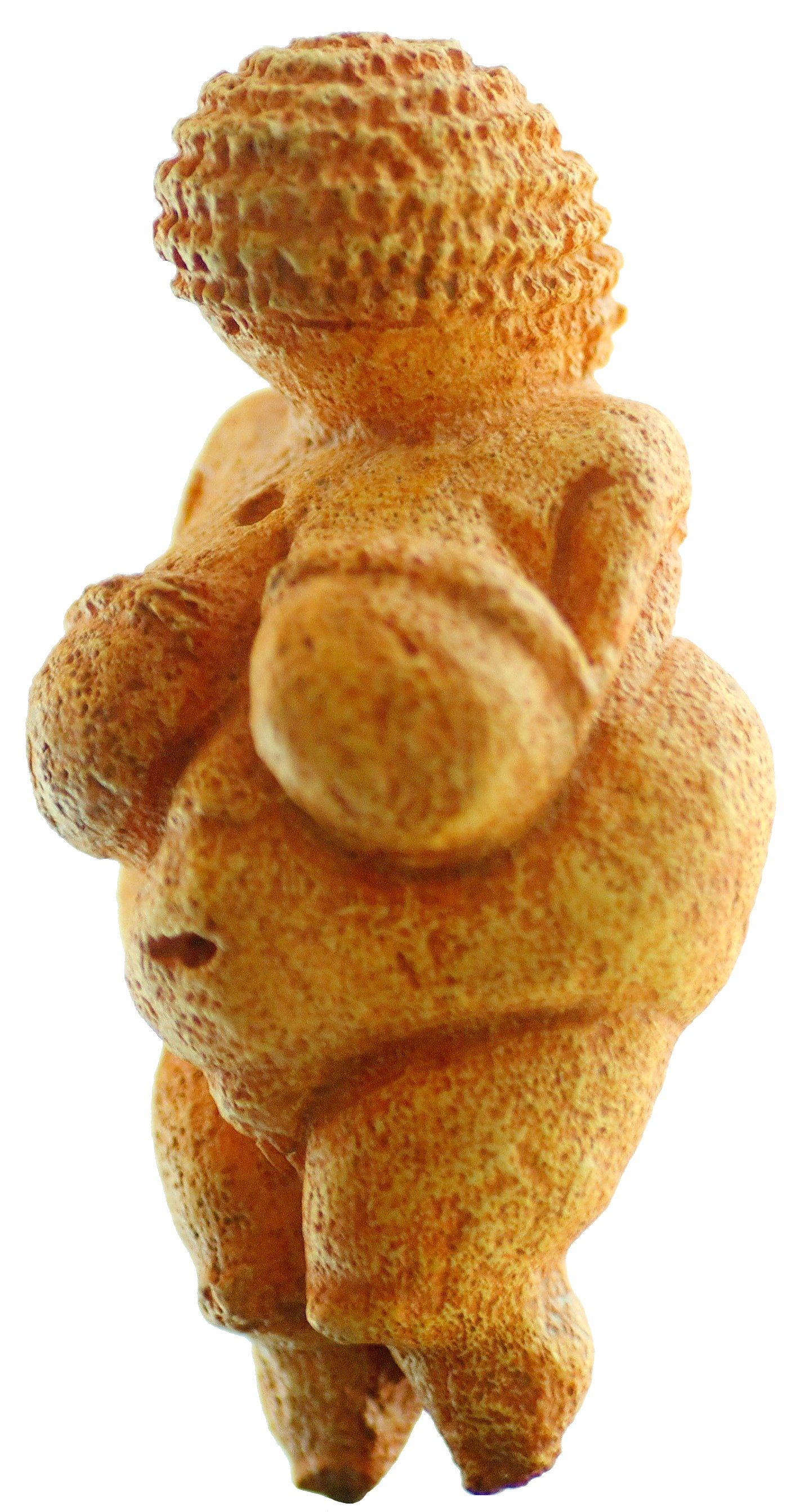
The Venus of Willendorf with braided hair

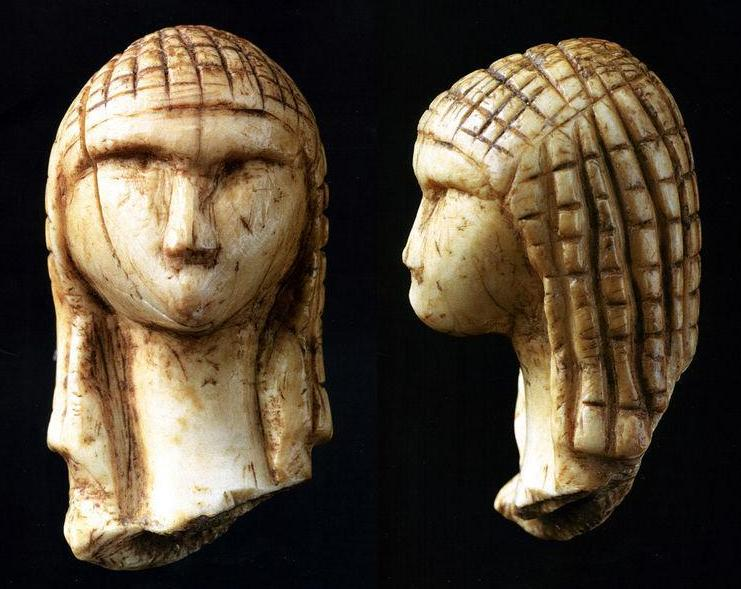
The Venus of Brassempouy

=== Bronze Age ===
During the Bronze Age, razors were known and in use by some men, but not on a daily basis since the procedure was rather unpleasant and required resharpening of the tool which reduced its endurance.

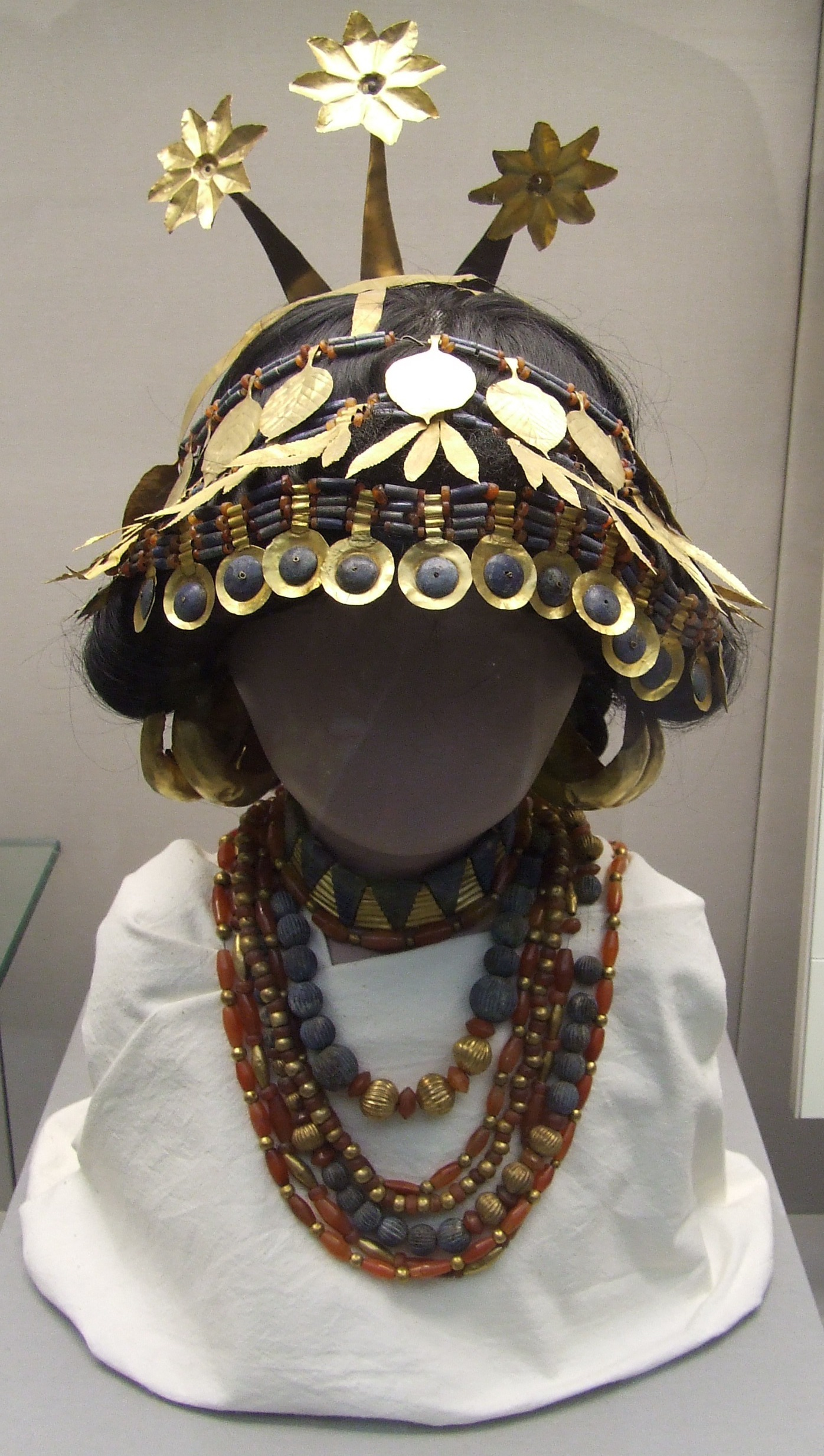
Reconstructed headgear of Puabi, the First Dynasty of Ur, circa 2500 BC, Early Dynastic period III

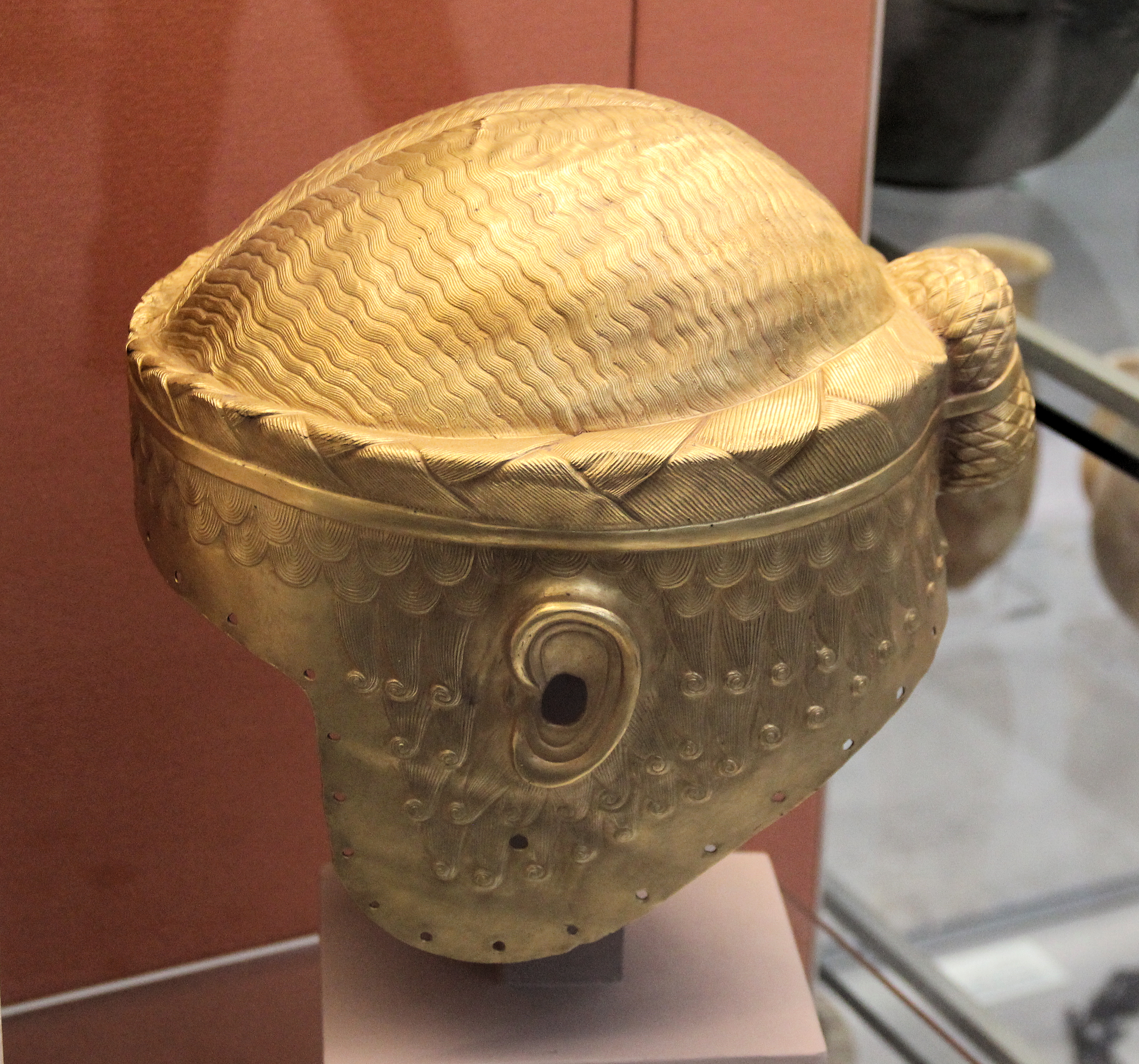
Golden helmet imitating hairstyle, the First Dynasty of Ur, circa 2500 BC, Early Dynastic period III

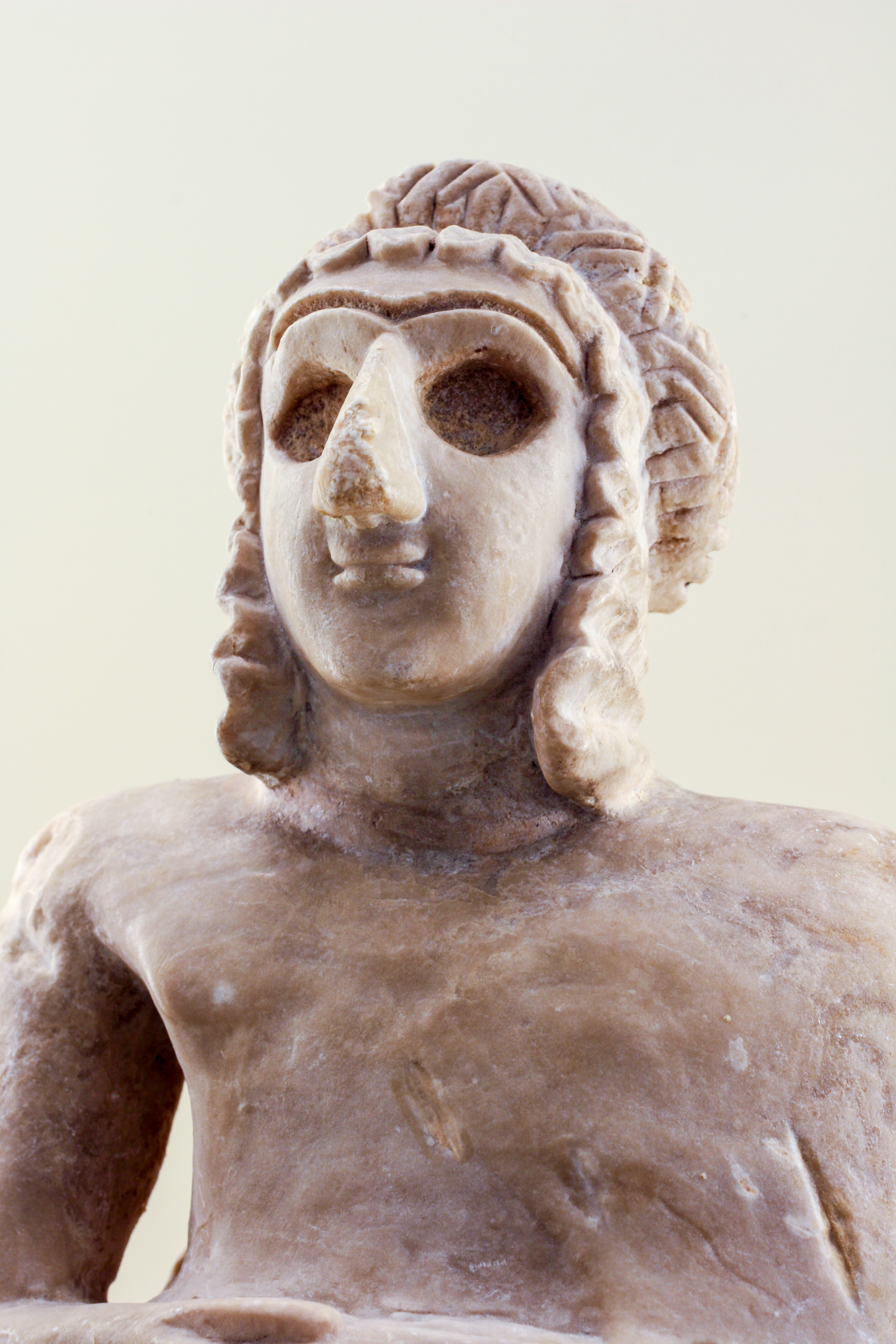
Sumerian portrait statuette of a woman

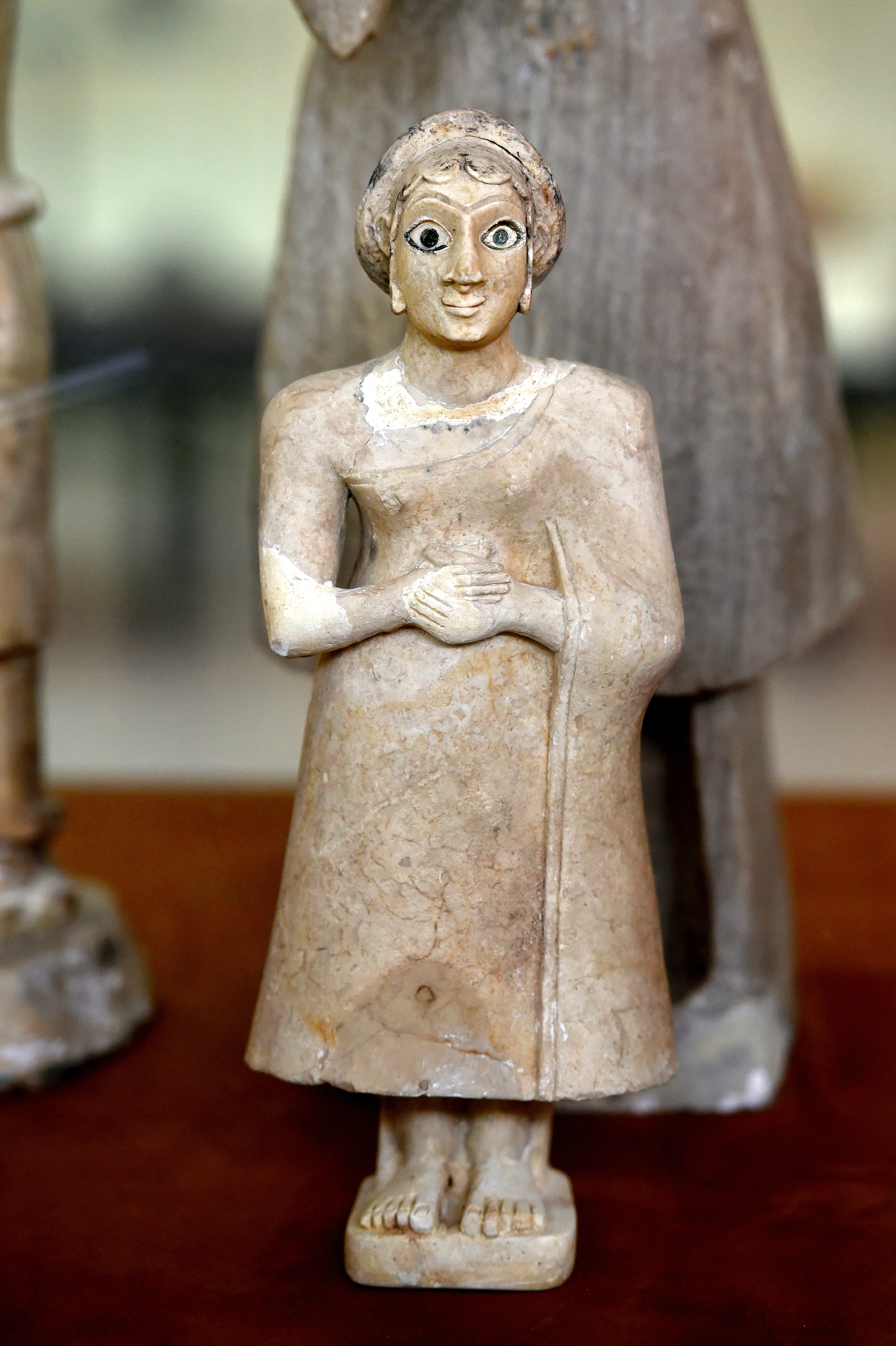
Sumerian statue from Khafajah, female worshiper

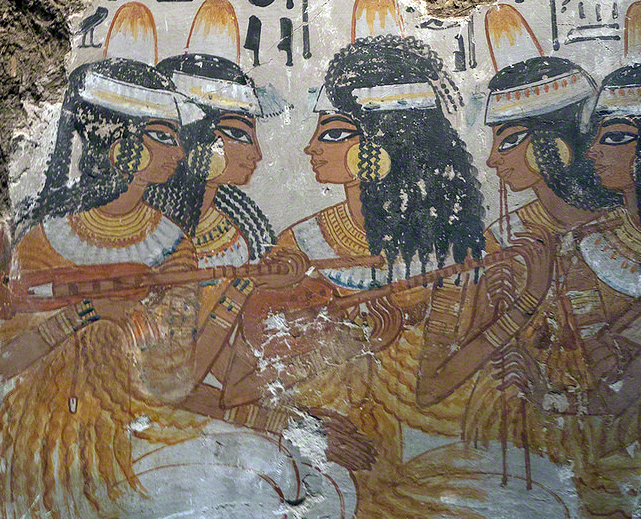
Egyptian women with braided hair and ornamental headdress, circa 1350 BC

=== Ancient history ===
In ancient civilizations, women's hair was often elaborately and carefully dressed in special ways. Women coloured their hair, curled it, and pinned it up in a variety of ways. For waves and curls, they used wet clay, which they dried in the sun before combing out, or they used a jelly made from quince seeds soaked in water. Additionally, various kinds of curling tongs and curling irons were popular tools for hair styling.

Hairstyles in ancient Korea and Japan were influenced by Chinese hairstyles. For instance, the chu'kye style worn in Koguryo was similar in style and head placement as the chu'kye style in China. The hairstyles were characterized by the large topknots on women's heads. Also, hairstyles were used as an expression of beauty, social status, and marital status. For instance, Japanese girls wore a mae-gami to symbolize the start of their coming-of-age ceremony. Single women in Baekjae put their hair in a long pigtail and married women would braid their hair on both sides of the head. The hairstyles displayed their marital status to those around them.

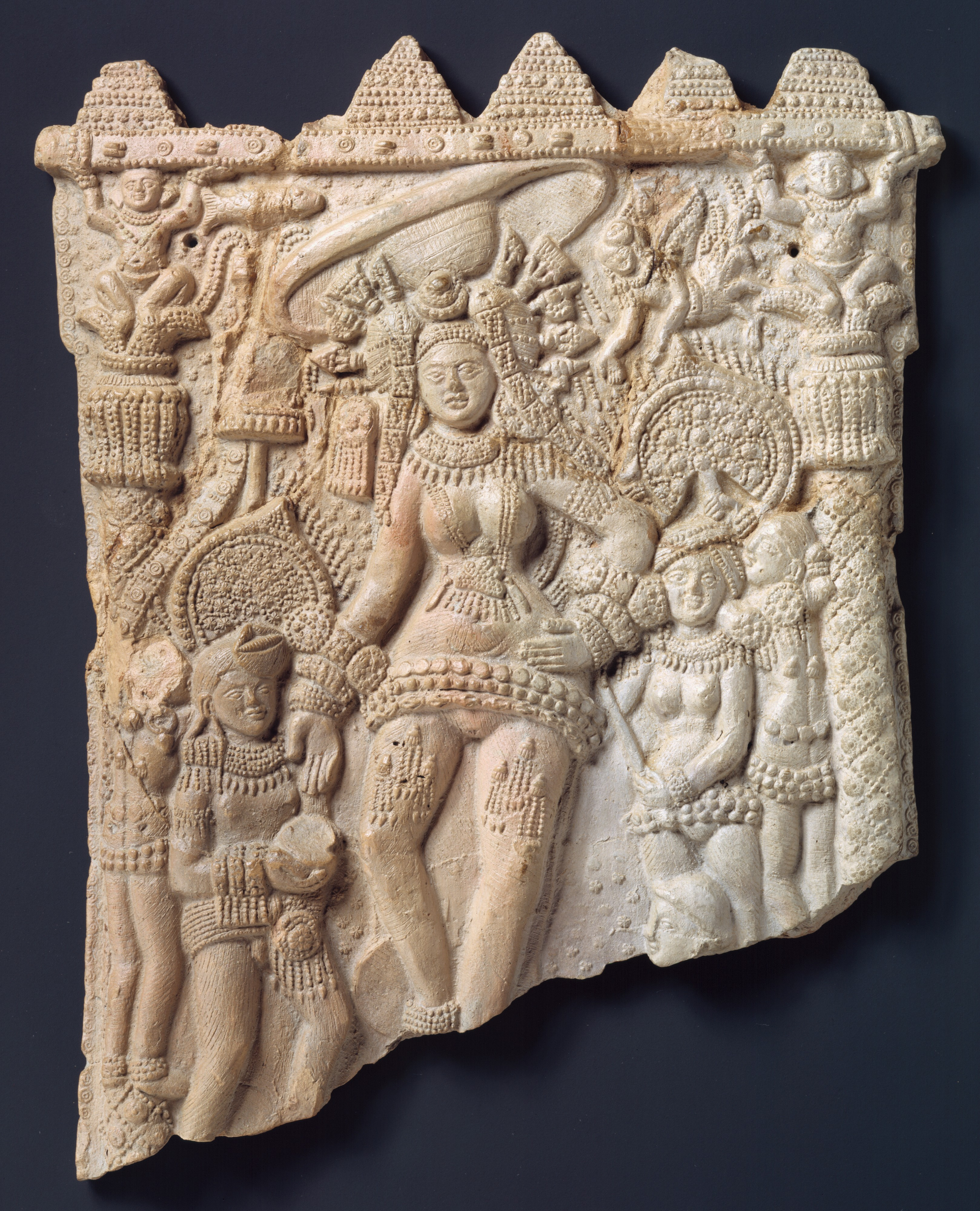
Female figure with elaborate coiffure and hairpins, West Bengal, India, 1st century BC

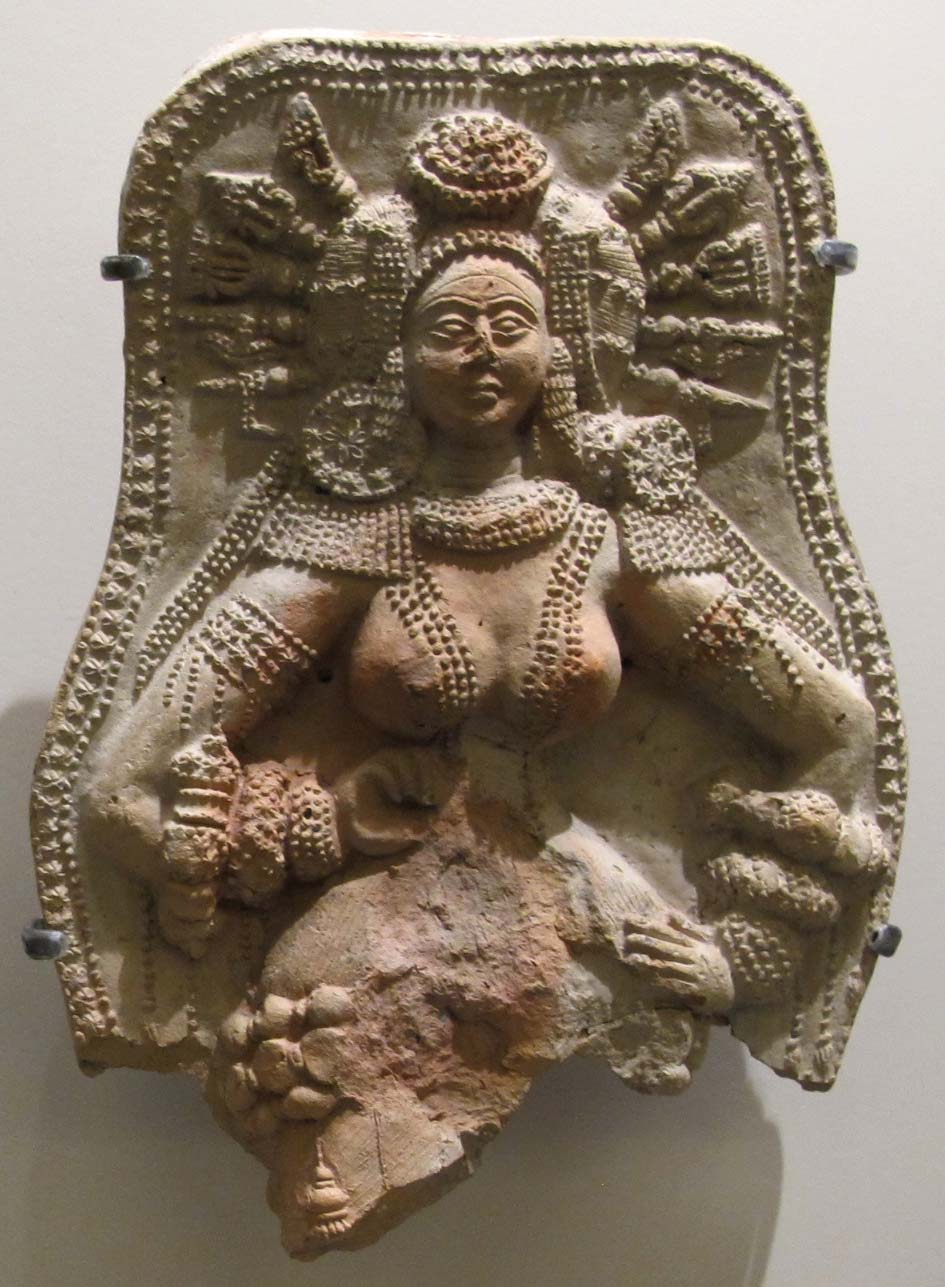
Female figure with elaborate hairpins in coiffure, India, 2nd-1st century BC.

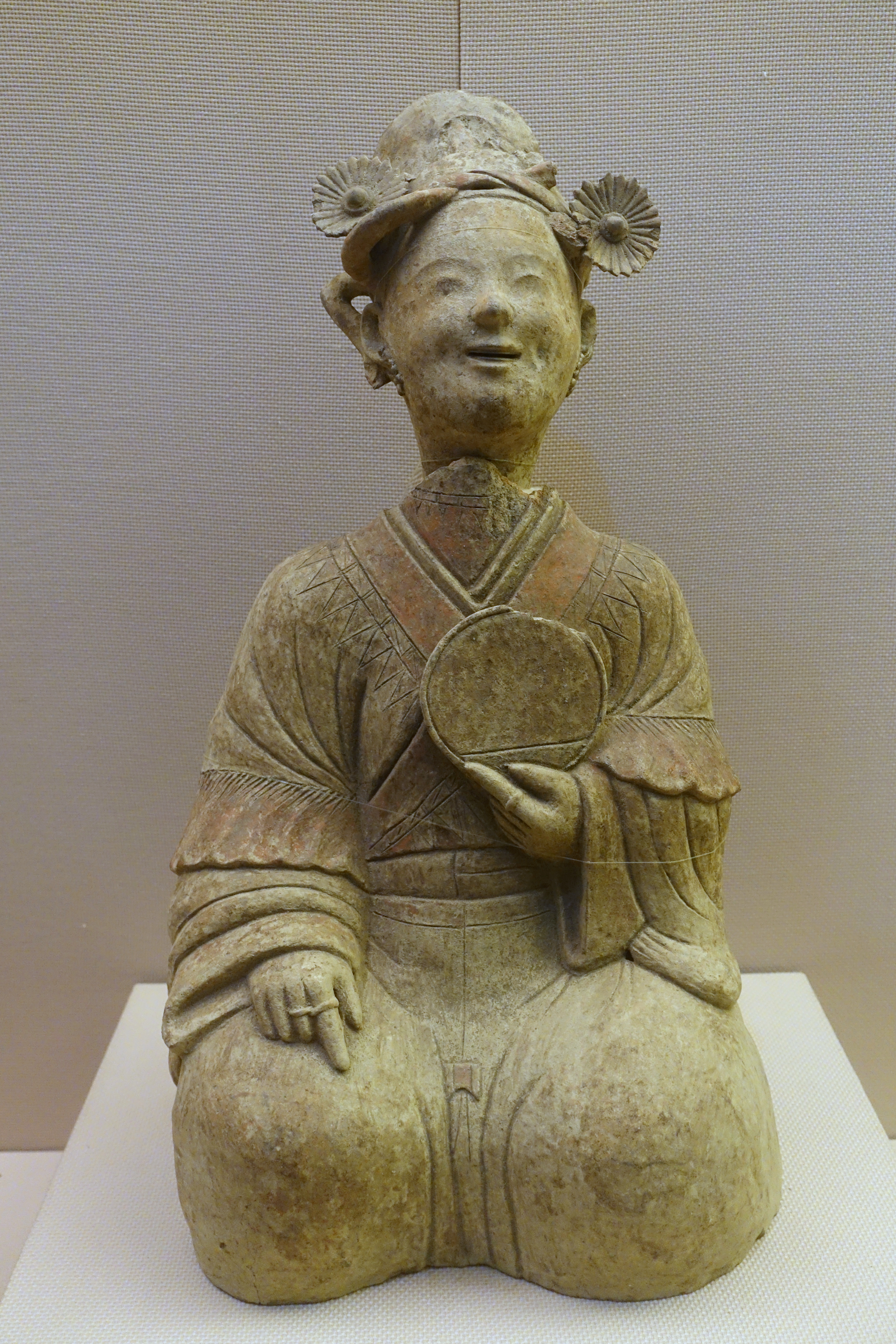
Lady with a coiffure and mirror, China, 25-220 AD.

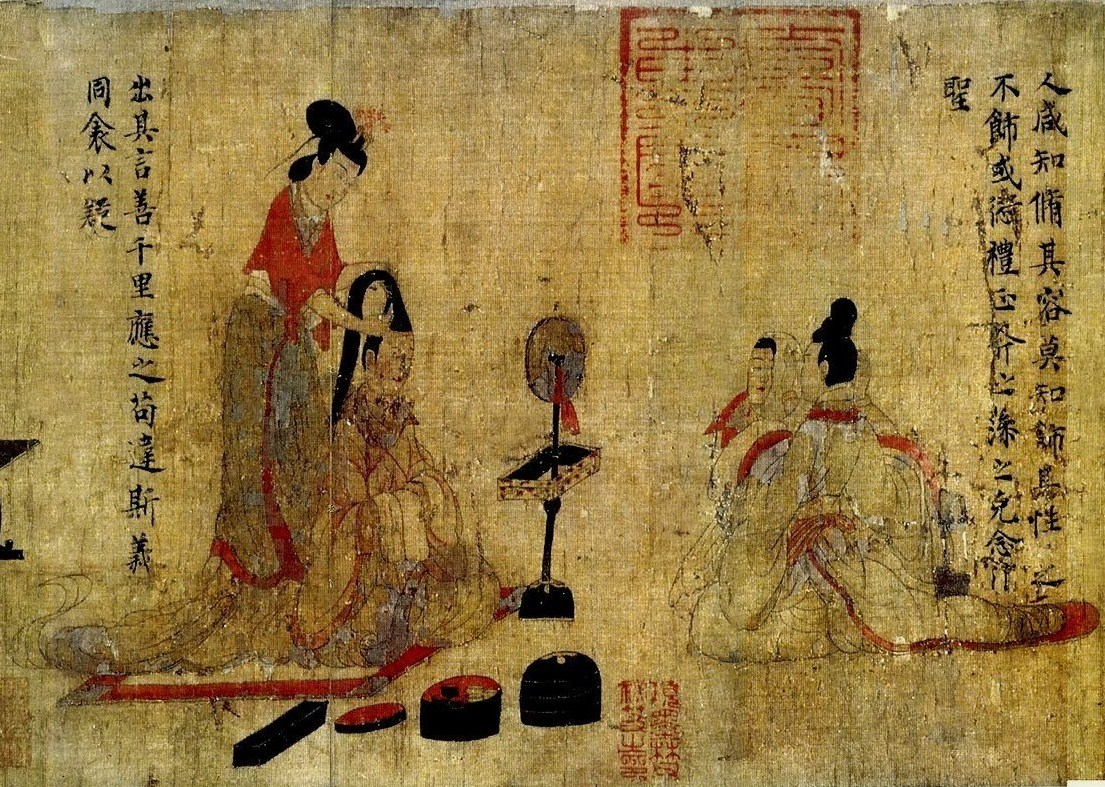
Painted scroll with hairdressing scene, China, 6th-8th century.

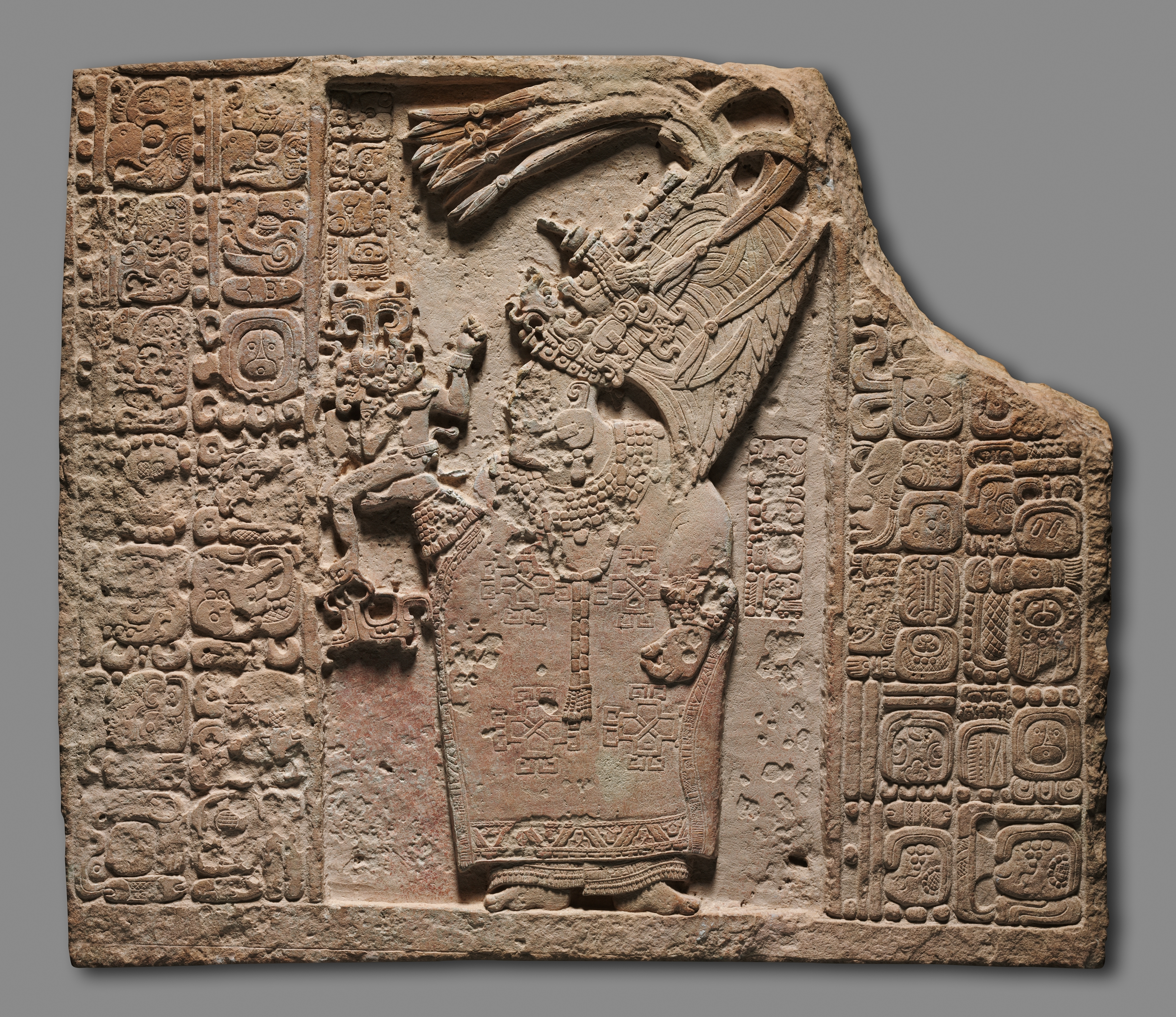
Mayan royal woman with elaborate headdress, Mexico, circa 795.

=== Roman Empire and Middle Ages ===
Between 27 BC and 102 AD, in Imperial Rome, women wore their hair in complicated styles: a mass of curls on top, or in rows of waves, drawn back into ringlets or braids. Eventually noble women's hairstyles grew so complex that they required daily attention from several enslaved people and a stylist in order to be maintained. The hair was often lightened using wood ash, unslaked lime and sodium bicarbonate, or darkened with copper filings, oak-apples or leeches marinated in wine and vinegar. It was augmented by wigs, hairpieces and pads, and held in place by nets, pins, combs and pomade. Under the Byzantine Empire, noblewomen covered most of their hair with silk caps and pearl nets.

From the time of the Roman Empire until the Middle Ages, most women grew their hair as long as it would naturally grow. It was normally styled through cutting, as women's hair was tied up on the head and covered on most occasions when outside the home by using a snood, kerchief or veil; for an adult woman to wear uncovered and loose hair in the street was often restricted to prostitutes. Braiding and tying the hair was common. In the 16th century, women began to wear their hair in extremely ornate styles, often decorated with pearls, precious stones, ribbons, and veils. Women used a technique called "lacing" or "taping," in which cords or ribbons were used to bind the hair around their heads. During this period, most of the hair was braided and hidden under wimples, veils or couvrechefs. In the later half of the 15th century and on into the 16th century, a very high hairline on the forehead was considered attractive, and wealthy women frequently plucked out hair at their temples and the napes of their necks, or used depilatory cream to remove it, if it would otherwise be visible at the edges of their hair coverings. Working-class women in this period wore their hair in simple styles.

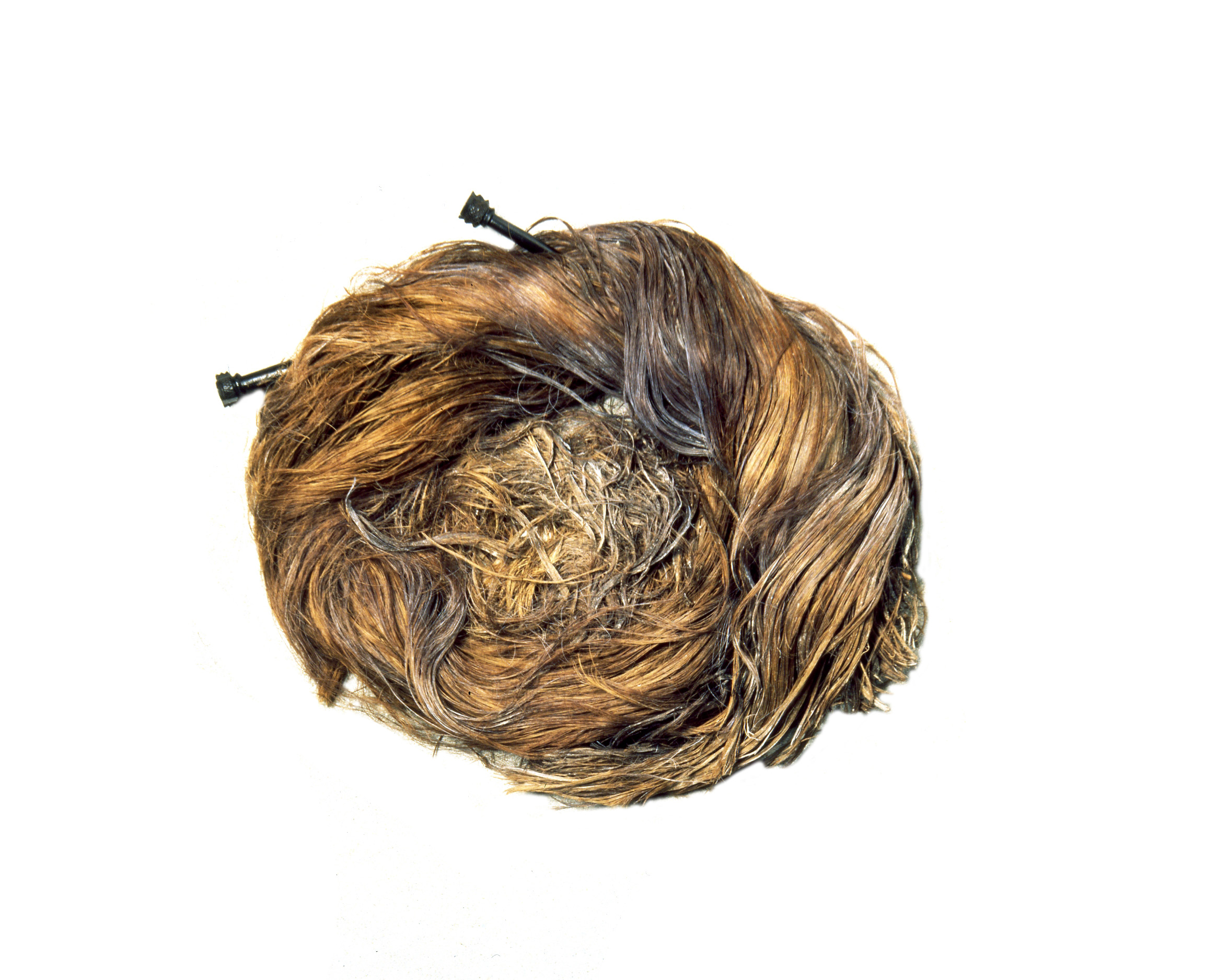
Romano-British hair piece with jet pins found in a lead coffin in Roman York

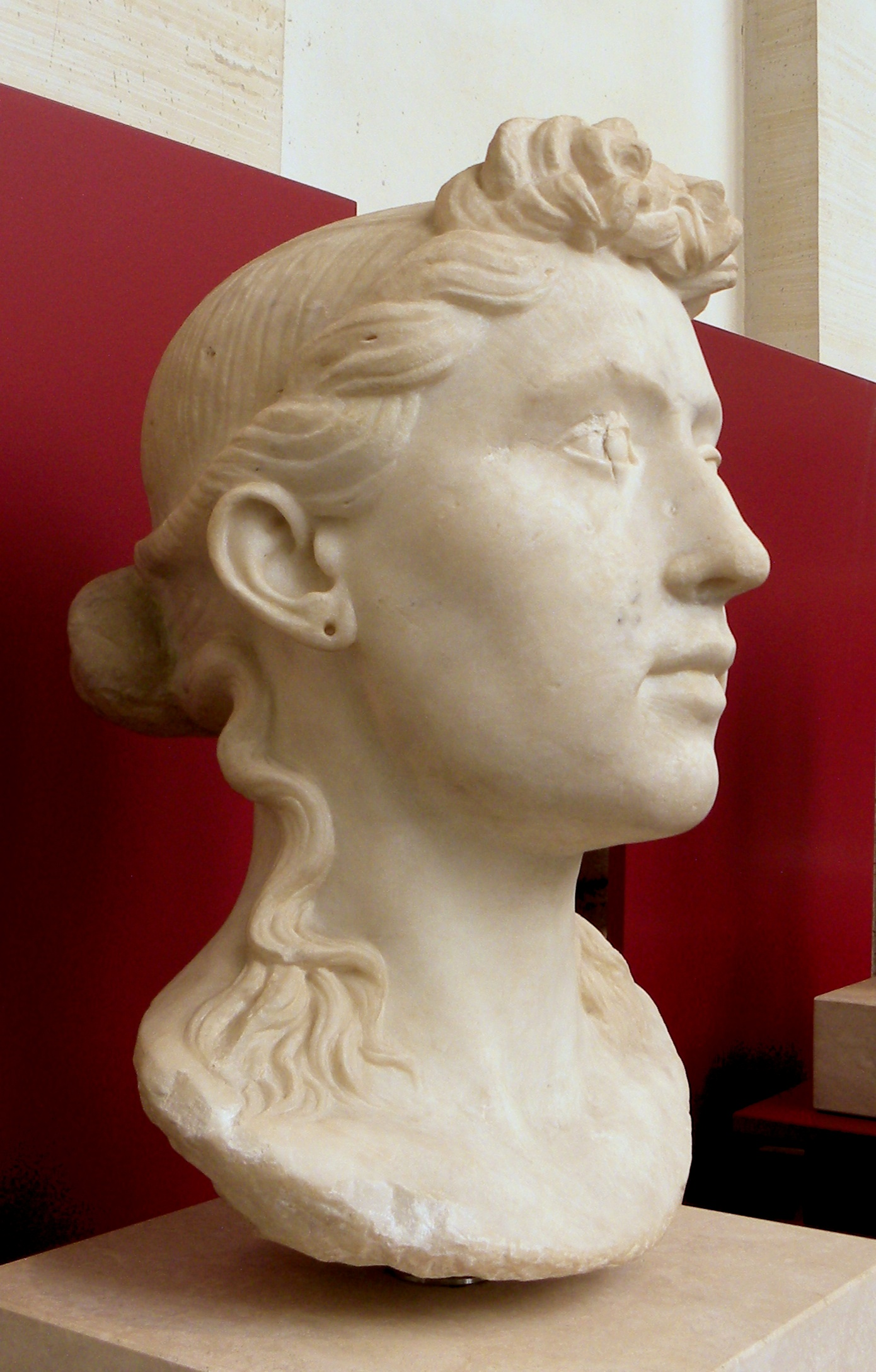
Late 1st century BC portrait of a Roman woman with an elaborate hairstyle found on the Via Latina in Rome

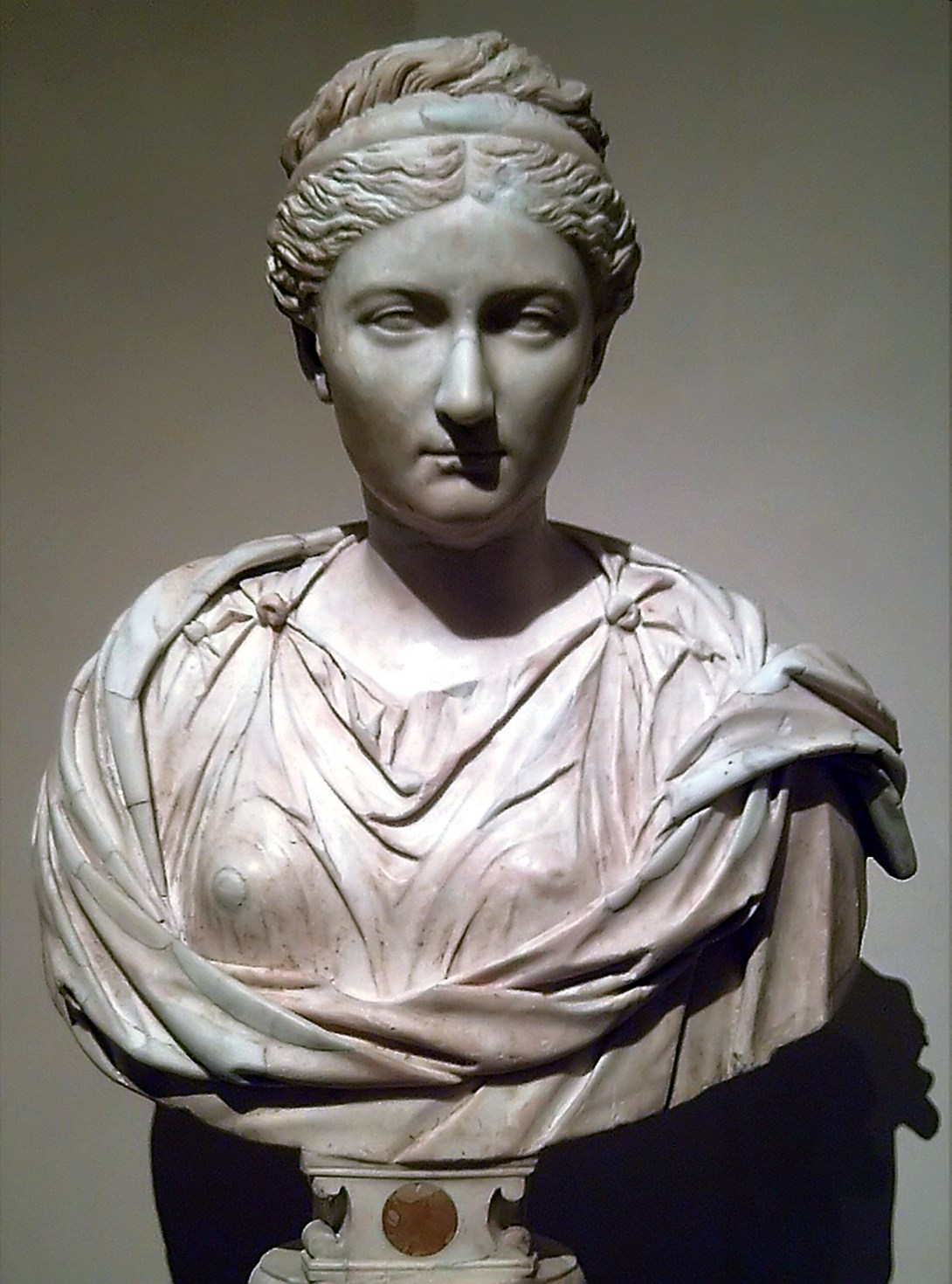
130 AD bust of Vibia Sabina with a hairband and center parting

=== Early modern history ===
==== Male styles ====
During the 15th and 16th centuries, European men wore their hair cropped no longer than shoulder-length, with very fashionable men wearing bangs or fringes. In Italy, it was common for men to dye their hair. In the early 17th century male hairstyles grew longer, with waves or curls being considered desirable in upper-class European men.

The male wig was supposedly pioneered by King Louis XIII of France (1601–1643) in 1624 when he had prematurely begun to bald. This fashion was largely promoted by his son and successor Louis XIV of France (1638–1715) that contributed to its spread in European and European-influenced countries. The beard had been in a long decline and now disappeared among the upper classes.

Perukes or periwigs for men were introduced into the English-speaking world with other French styles when Charles II was restored to the throne in 1660, following a lengthy exile in France. These wigs were shoulder-length or longer, imitating the long hair that had become fashionable among men since the 1620s. Their use soon became popular in the English court. The London diarist Samuel Pepys recorded the day in 1665 that a barber had shaved his head and that he tried on his new periwig for the first time, but in a year of plague he was uneasy about wearing it:

3rd September 1665: Up, and put on my coloured silk suit, very fine, and my new periwig, bought a good while since, but darst not wear it because the plague was in Westminster when I bought it. And it is a wonder what will be the fashion after the plague is done as to periwigs, for nobody will dare to buy any hair for fear of the infection? That it had been cut off the heads of people dead of the plague.

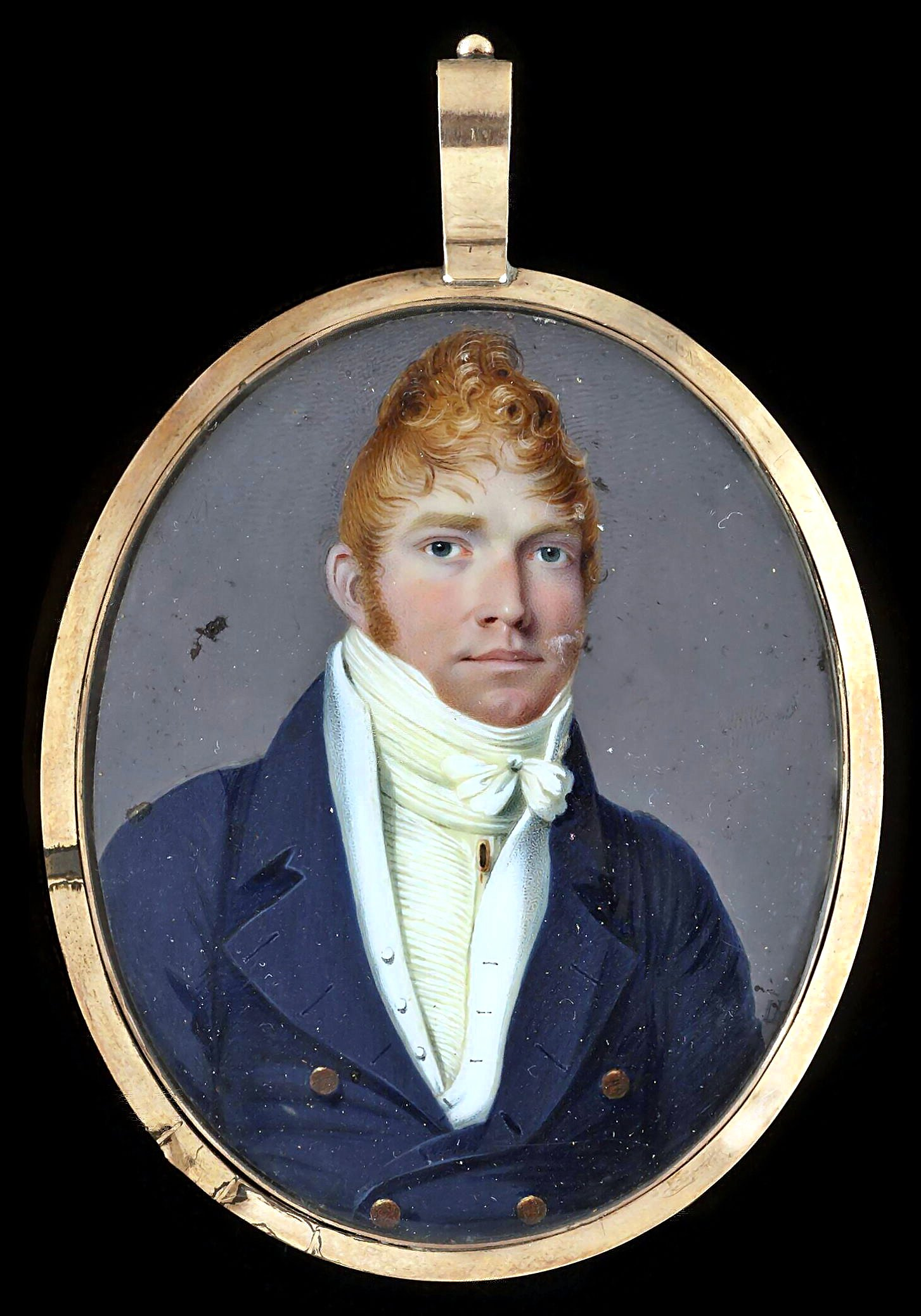
1800s Men's Hairstyles in England

Late 17th-century wigs were very long and wavy (see George I below), but became shorter in the mid-18th century, by which time they were normally white (George II). A very common style had a single stiff curl running round the head at the end of the hair. By the late 18th century the natural hair was often powdered to achieve the impression of a short wig, tied into a small tail or "queue" behind (George III).

Short hair for fashionable men was a product of the Neoclassical movement. Classically inspired male hair styles included the Bedford Crop, arguably the precursor of most plain modern male styles, which was invented by the radical politician Francis Russell, 5th Duke of Bedford as a protest against a tax on hair powder; he encouraged his friends to adopt it by betting them they would not. Another influential style (or group of styles) was named by the French "coiffure à la Titus" after Titus Junius Brutus (not in fact the Roman Emperor Titus as often assumed), with hair short and layered but somewhat piled up on the crown, often with restrained quiffs or locks hanging down; variants are familiar from the hair of both Napoleon and George IV. The style was supposed to have been introduced by the actor François-Joseph Talma, who upstaged his wigged co-actors when appearing in productions of works such as Voltaire's Brutus (about Lucius Junius Brutus, who orders the execution of his son Titus). In 1799, a Parisian fashion magazine reported that even bald men were adopting Titus wigs, and the style was also worn by women, the Journal de Paris reporting in 1802 that "more than half of elegant women were wearing their hair or wig à la Titus".

In the early 19th century the male beard, as well as moustaches and sideburns, made a strong reappearance that is generally associated with the Romantic movement. These styles were common until the 1890s, but by World War I the full beard was largely dispatched by increased rates of military service. Except for older men retaining the styles of their youth and those affecting a Bohemian look, the short, military-style moustache remained popular.

==== Female styles ====
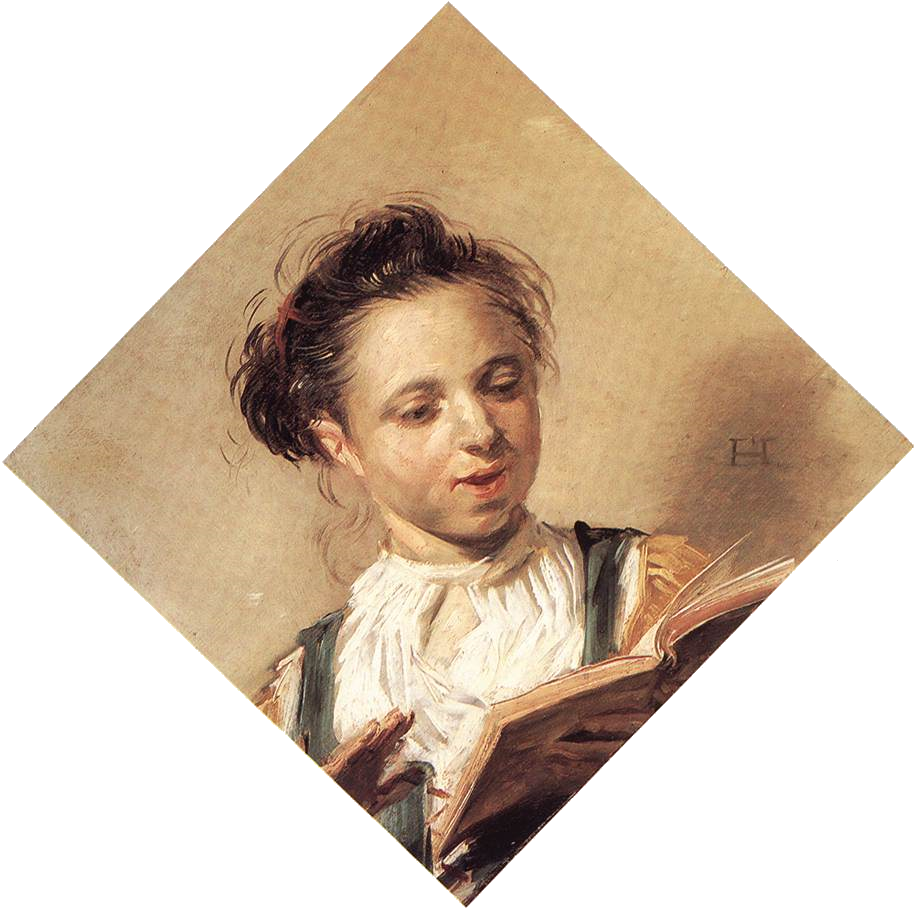
Low "messy" bun in an everyday domestic context in 17th-century Holland. Girl Singing by Frans Hals, about 1628

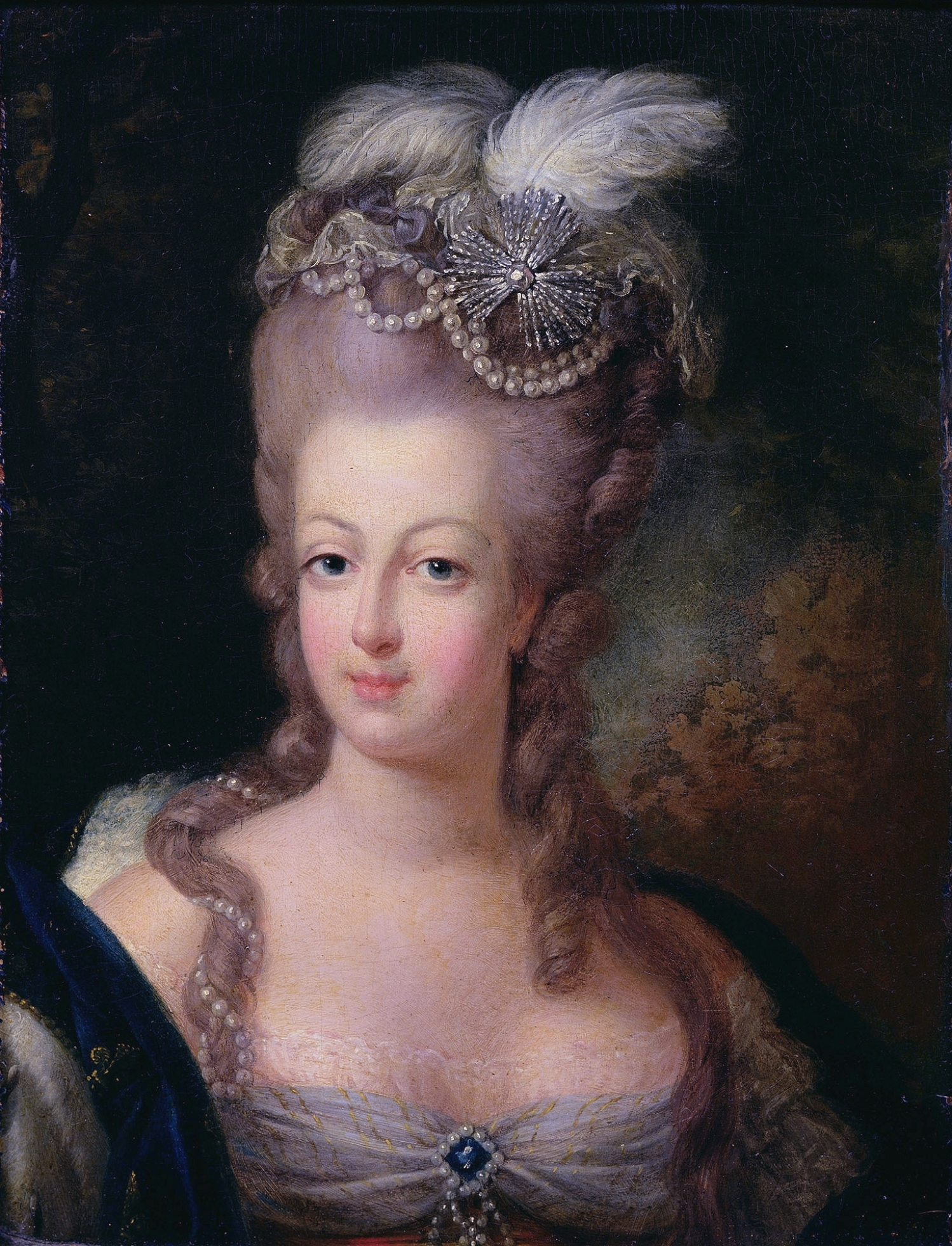
Marie Antoinette with pouf hairstyle

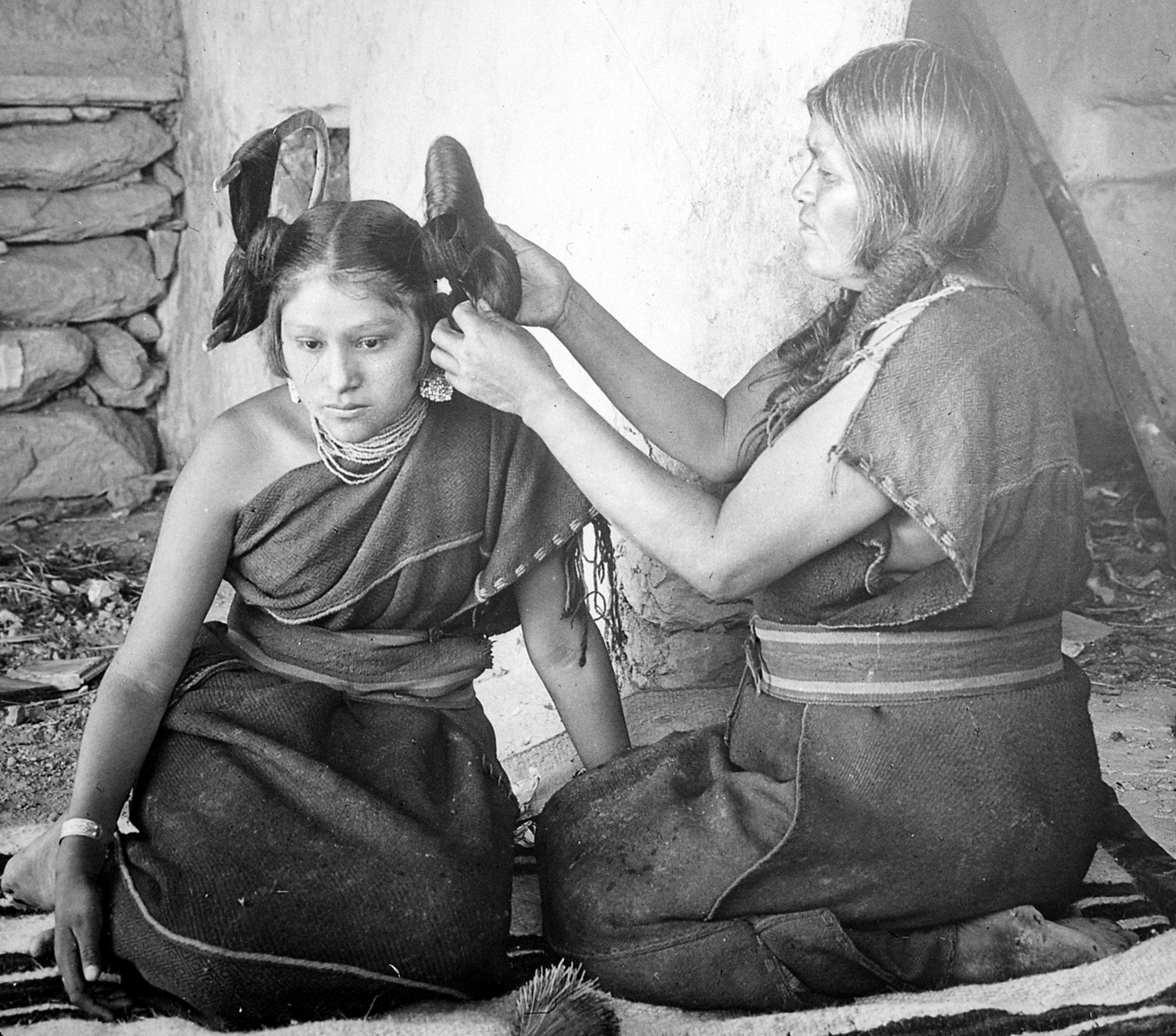
Hopi woman dressing hair, ca. 1900

From the 16th to the 19th century, European women's hair became more visible while their hair coverings grew smaller, with both becoming more elaborate, and with hairstyles beginning to include ornamentation such as flowers, ostrich plumes, ropes of pearls, jewels, ribbons and small crafted objects such as replicas of ships and windmills. Bound hair was felt to be symbolic of propriety: letting one’s hair down was considered immodest and sexual, and sometimes was felt to have supernatural connotations. Red hair was popular, particularly in England during the reign of the red-haired Elizabeth I, and women and aristocratic men used borax, saltpeter, saffron and sulfur powder to dye their hair red, making themselves nauseated and giving themselves headaches and nosebleeds. During this period in Spain and Latin cultures, women wore lace mantillas, often worn over a high comb, and in Buenos Aires, there developed a fashion for extremely large tortoise-shell hair combs called peinetón, which could measure up to three feet in height and width, and which are said by historians to have reflected the growing influence of France, rather than Spain, upon Argentinians.

In the middle of the 18th century the pouf style developed, with women creating volume in the hair at the front of the head, usually with a pad underneath to lift it higher, and ornamented the back with seashells, pearls or gemstones. In 1750, women began dressing their hair with perfumed pomade and powdering it white. Just before World War I, some women began wearing silk turbans over their hair.

==== Japan ====
In the early 1870s, in a shift that historians attribute to the influence of the West, Japanese men began cutting their hair into styles known as jangiri or zangiri (which roughly means "random cropping"). During this period, Japanese women were still wearing traditional hairstyles held up with combs, pins, and sticks crafted from tortoise, metal, wood and other materials, but in the middle 1880s, upper-class Japanese women began pushing back their hair in the Western style (known as sokuhatsu), or adopting Westernized versions of traditional Japanese hairstyles (these were called yakaimaki, or literally, "soirée chignon").

=== Inter-war years ===
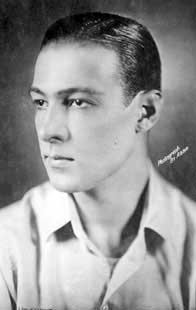
Movie star Rudolph Valentino

During the First World War, women around the world started to shift to shorter hairstyles that were easier to manage. After WWI women started to bob, shingle and crop their hair, often covering it with small head-hugging cloche hats. In Korea, the bob was called tanbal. In Europe and the US the bob was seen as a step towards women's liberation. Women began marcelling their hair, creating deep waves in it using heated scissor irons. Durable permanent waving became popular also in this period: it was an expensive, uncomfortable and time-consuming process, in which the hair was put in curlers and inserted into a steam or dry heat machine. During the 1930s women began to wear their hair slightly longer, in pageboys, bobs or waves and curls.

During the 1920s and 1930s, Japanese women began wearing their hair in a style called mimi-kakushi (literally, "ear hiding"), in which hair was pulled back to cover the ears and tied into a bun at the nape of the neck. Waved or curled hair became increasingly popular for Japanese women throughout this period, and permanent waves, though controversial, were extremely popular. Bobbed hair also became more popular for Japanese women, mainly among actresses and moga, or "cut-hair girls," young Japanese women who followed Westernized fashions and lifestyles in the 1920s.

During this period, Western men began to wear their hair in ways popularized by movie stars such as Douglas Fairbanks Jr. and Rudolph Valentino. Men wore their hair short, and either parted on the side or in the middle, or combed straight back, and used pomade, creams and tonics to keep their hair in place. At the beginning of the Second World War and for some time afterwards, men's haircuts grew shorter, mimicking the military crewcut.

=== Post-war years ===
After the war, women started to wear their hair in softer, more natural styles. In the early 1950s women's hair was generally curled and worn in a variety of styles and lengths. In the later 1950s, high bouffant and beehive styles, sometimes nicknamed B-52s for their similarity to the bulbous noses of the B-52 Stratofortress bomber, became popular. During this period many women washed and set their hair only once a week, and kept it in place by wearing curlers every night and reteasing and respraying it every morning. In the 1960s, many women began to wear their hair in short modern cuts such as the pixie cut, while in the 1970s, hair tended to be longer and looser. In both the 1960s and 1970s many men and women wore their hair very long and straight. Long, natural hair was also worn due to the emergence of counterculture movements such as that of the hippies who used such styles to symbolize their opposition to the norm. From the 1950s onward, various groups have pushed the norms for hairstyles as symbols of their unique ideology or identity. The Skinheads, who opposed the hippies, shaved off much of their hair. The punks of the later 1970s, meanwhile, wanted to cause outrage, styling their hair in unique ways (such as the mohawk) and dyeing it in unnatural shades. Women straightened their hair through chemical straightening processes, by ironing their hair at home with a clothes iron, or by rolling it up with large empty soda cans while wet.

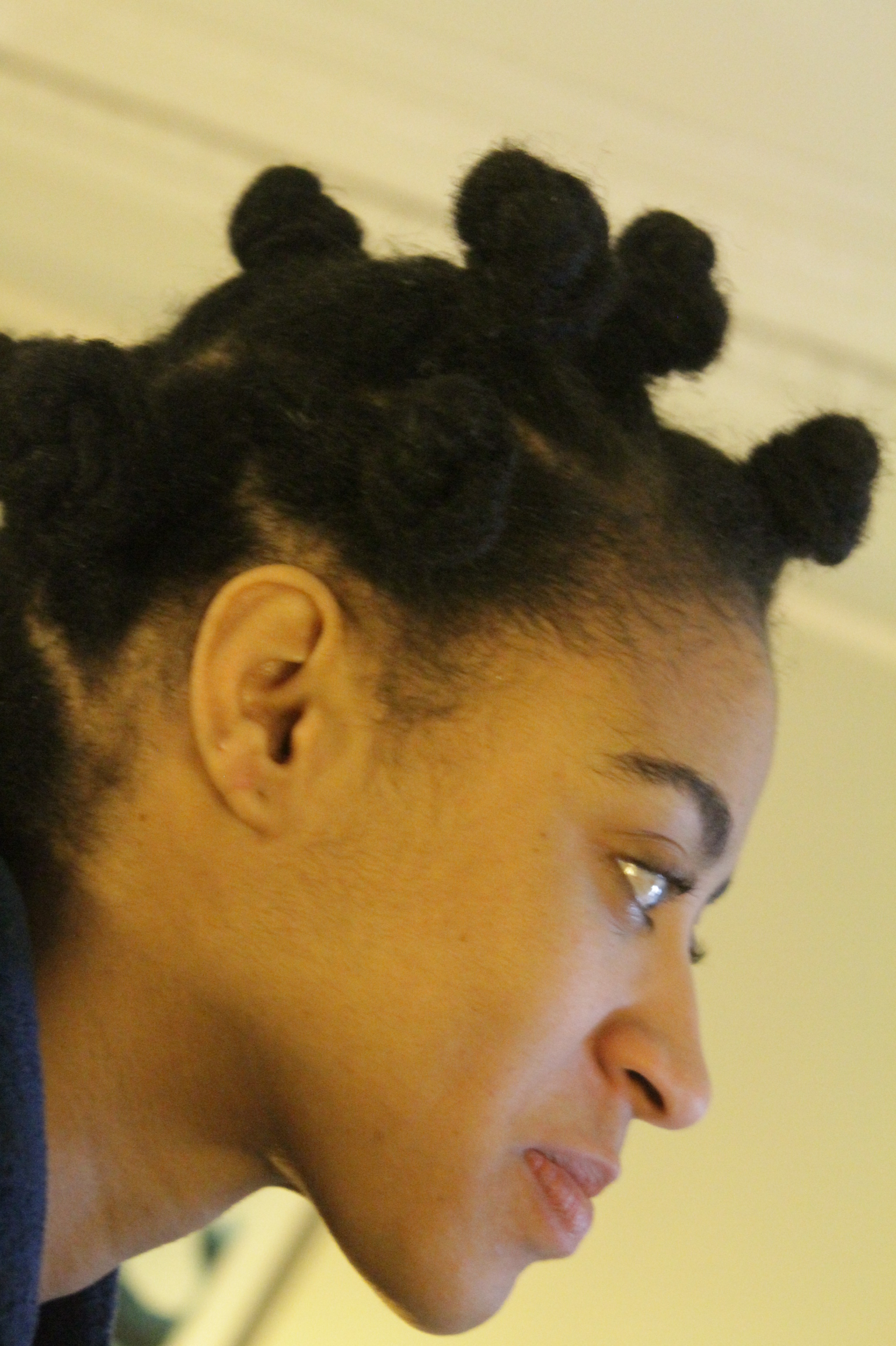
Bantu Knots

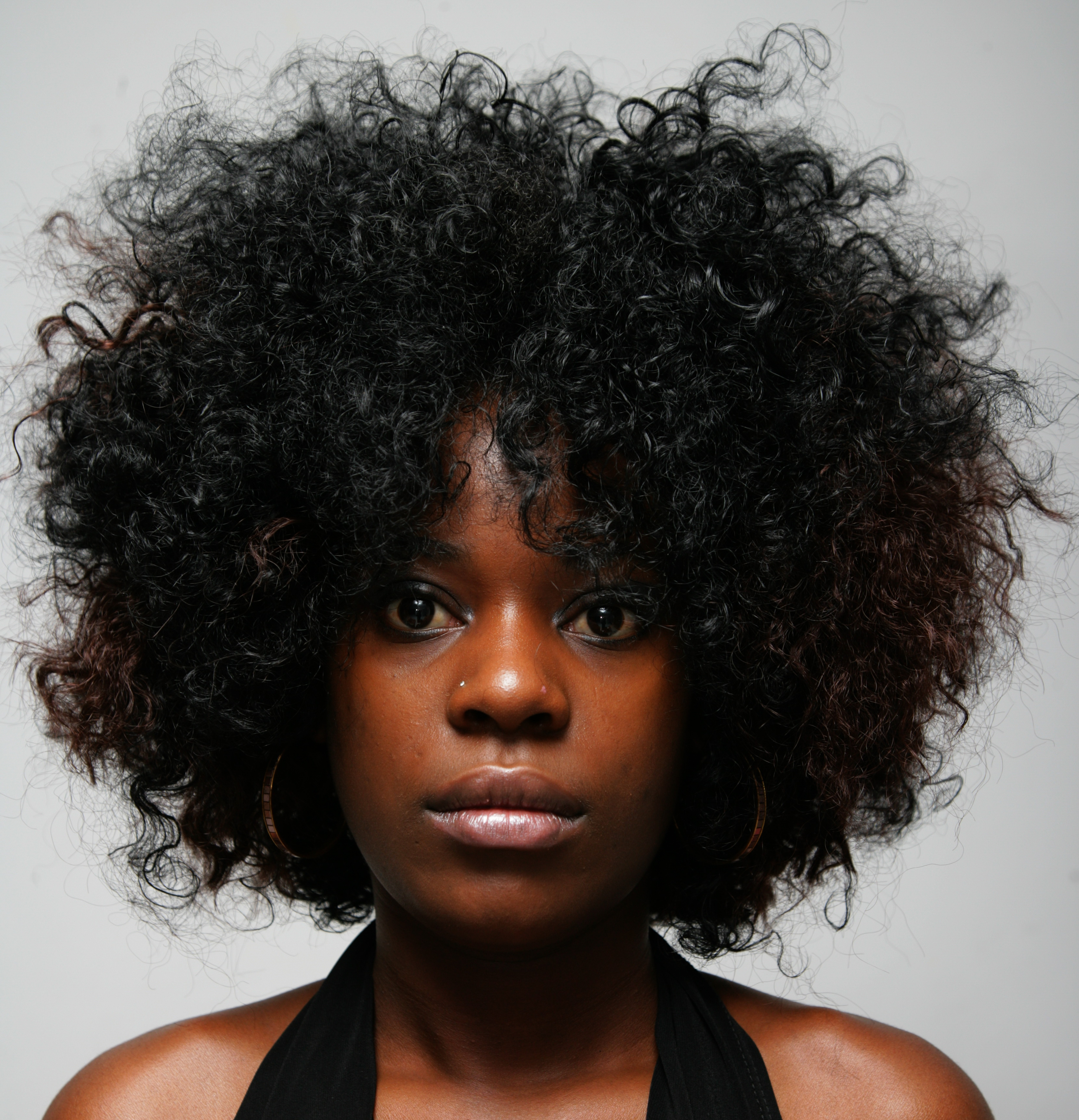
Woman wearing a loose Afro

Since the 1960s and 1970s, women have worn their hair in a wide variety of styles. Part of this came from the "Black is Beautiful" movement which promoted the natural beauty of the Black population as opposed to what some considered a Eurocentric model. Some critics argue that straightening or relaxing African hair is trying to conform to a white standard of beauty. However, there are those that disagree with this belief. Nevertheless, Malcolm X advised against Black people straightening their hair for such reasons. Black hair then became not only an act of beauty but an act of revolution. The Afro, specifically, was both fashionable and political in the 1960s onward. However, the Afro, or "the natural", as it was first called, was not originally a political choice, but a style favored by both artistic and intellectual Black communities in the 1940s and 1950s.

=== Contemporary hairstyles ===
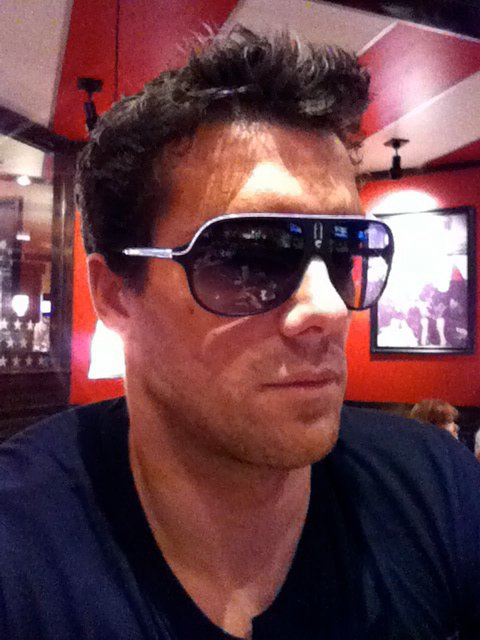
Man with styled hair, 2011

The challenges to social norms for hair in the 1960s onward alongside the more accessible hair dyes allowed for a variation in hairstyles to emerge. In the contemporary world, women and men can choose from a broad range of hairstyles. But they are still expected to wear their hair in ways that conform to gender norms: in much of the world, men with long hair and women whose hair does not appear carefully groomed may face various forms of discrimination, including harassment, social shaming or workplace discrimination. This is somewhat less true of African-American men, who wear their hair in a variety of styles that overlap with those of African-American women, including box braids and cornrows fastened with rubber bands and dreadlocks.

In the 1980s, women pulled back their hair with scrunchies, stretchy ponytail holders made from cloth over fabric bands. Women also often wear glittery ornaments today, as well as claw-style barrettes used to secure ponytails and other upswept or partially upswept hairstyles.

The 1980s in America also were a time of noted turmoil between hair choices. Tensions arose particularly between hair choices from women of color, and the workplace as noted by court cases such as Rogers v. American Airlines which upheld employers rights to ban certain hairstyles in the workplace, notably braided hairstyles. Additional instances of USPS, hotel chains, police departments and another industries banning hairstyles common within the Black American community such as braids, colored hair, and dreadlocks from the workplace during this period.

== Defining factors ==
A hairstyle's aesthetic considerations may be determined by many factors, such as the subject's physical attributes and desired self-image and/or the stylist's artistic instincts.

Physical factors include natural hair type and growth patterns, face and head shape from various angles, and overall body proportions; medical considerations may also apply. Self-image may be directed toward conforming to mainstream values (military-style crew cuts or current "fad" hairstyles such as the Dido flip), identifying with distinctively groomed subgroups (e.g., punk hair), or obeying religious dictates (e.g., Orthodox Jewish have payot, Rastafari have Dreadlocks, Sadhus jatas in India and Nepal, or the Sikh practice of Kesh), though this is highly contextual such that "mainstream" look in one setting may be limited to a "subgroup" in another.

A hairstyle is achieved by arranging hair in a certain way, occasionally using combs, a blow-dryer, gel, or other products. The practice of styling hair is often called hairdressing, especially when done as an occupation.

Hairstyling may also include adding accessories (such as headbands or barrettes) to the hair to hold it in place, enhance its ornamental appearance, or partially or fully conceal it with coverings such as a kippah, hijab, tam or turban.

== Hairstyling techniques ==
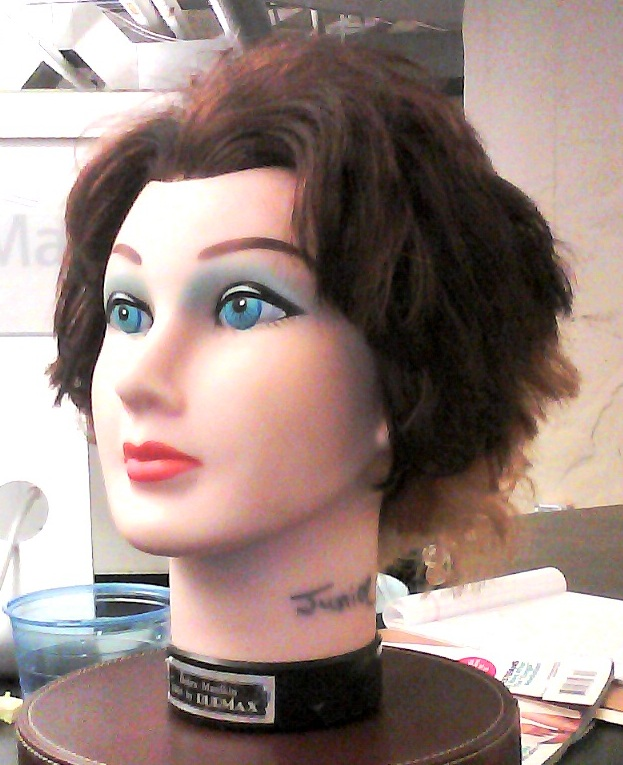
In the United States, cosmetology students purchase practice heads with human hair to learn cutting, coloring and styling.

Hair dressing may include cuts, weaves, coloring, extensions, perms, permanent relaxers, curling, and any other form of styling or texturing.

Some of these techniques are described in detail below;

=== Washing ===
Stylists often wash a subject's hair first, so that the hair is cut while still slightly damp. Compared to dry hair, wet hair can be easier to manage in a cut/style situation because the added weight and surface tension of the water cause the strands to stretch downward and cling together along the hair's length, holding a line and making it easier for the stylist to create a form. This method of cutting hair while wet, may be most suitable (or common) for straight hair types. Curly, kinky and other types of hair textures with considerable volume may benefit from cutting while dry, as the hair is in a more natural state and the hair can be cut evenly.

=== Cutting ===
A video narrating the step by step process of achieving a clean hair cut.

Hair cutting or hair trimming is intended to create or maintain a specific shape and form. There are ways to trim one's own hair but usually another person is enlisted to perform the process, as it is difficult to maintain symmetry while cutting hair at the back of one's head.

Cutting hair is often done with hair clipper, scissors, and razors. Combs and hair grips are often employed to isolate a section of hair which is then trimmed.

=== Blending ===
Blending is a technique used to create a seamless transition between different lengths or textures of hair. This process ensures that there are no harsh lines or visible distinctions where one section of hair ends, and another begins. Stylists typically use thinning shears, razors, or specific scissor techniques to soften the edges of a haircut. Blending is especially important in layered cuts or when merging short and long sections, as it gives the hairstyle a cohesive and natural look.

=== Brushing and combing ===
Brushes and combs are used to organize and untangle the hair, encouraging all of the strands to lie in the same direction and removing debris such as lint, dandruff, or hairs that have already shed from their follicles but continue to cling to the other hairs.

There are a wide range of detangling tools available in a wide variety of price ranges. Combs come in all shapes and sizes and all manner of materials, including plastics, wood, and horn. Similarly, brushes also come in all sizes and shapes, including various paddle shapes. Most benefit from using some form of a wide tooth comb for detangling. Most physicians advise against sharing hair care instruments like combs and clips, to prevent spreading hair conditions like dandruff and head lice.

The historical dictum to brush hair with 100 strokes every day is somewhat archaic, dating from a time when hair was washed less frequently; the brushstrokes would spread the scalp's natural oils down through the hair, creating a protective effect. Now, however, this does not apply when the natural oils have been washed off by frequent shampoos. Also, hairbrushes are now usually made with rigid plastic bristles instead of the natural boar's bristles that were once standard; the plastic bristles increase the likelihood of actually injuring the scalp and hair with excessively vigorous brushing. However, traditional brushes with boar's bristles are still commonly used among African Americans and those with coarse or kinky textures to soften and lay down curls and waves.

=== Drying ===
Hair dryers speed the drying process of hair by blowing air, which is usually heated, over the wet hair shaft to accelerate the rate of water evaporation.

Excessive heat may increase the rate of shaft-splitting or other damage to the hair. Hair dryer diffusers can be used to widen the stream of air flow so it is weaker but covers a larger area of the hair.

Hair dryers can also be used as a tool to sculpt the hair to a very slight degree. Proper technique involves aiming the dryer such that the air does not blow onto the face or scalp, which can cause burns.

Other common hair drying techniques include towel drying and air drying.

=== Braiding and updos ===
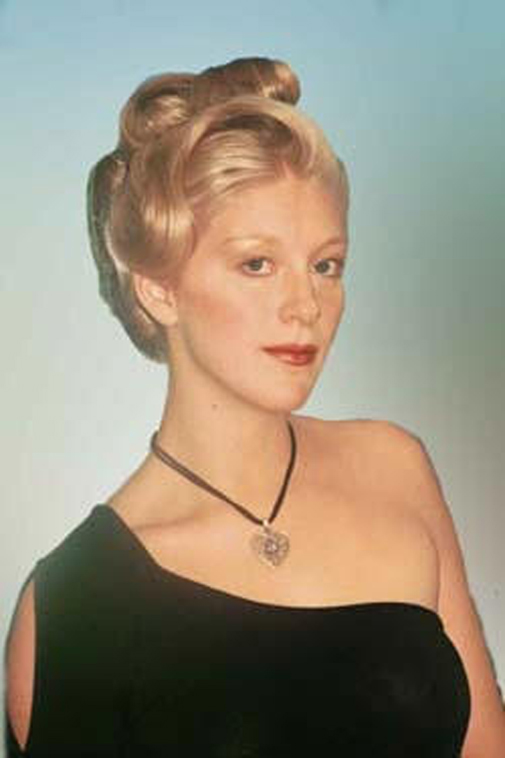
Examples of formal updos on women

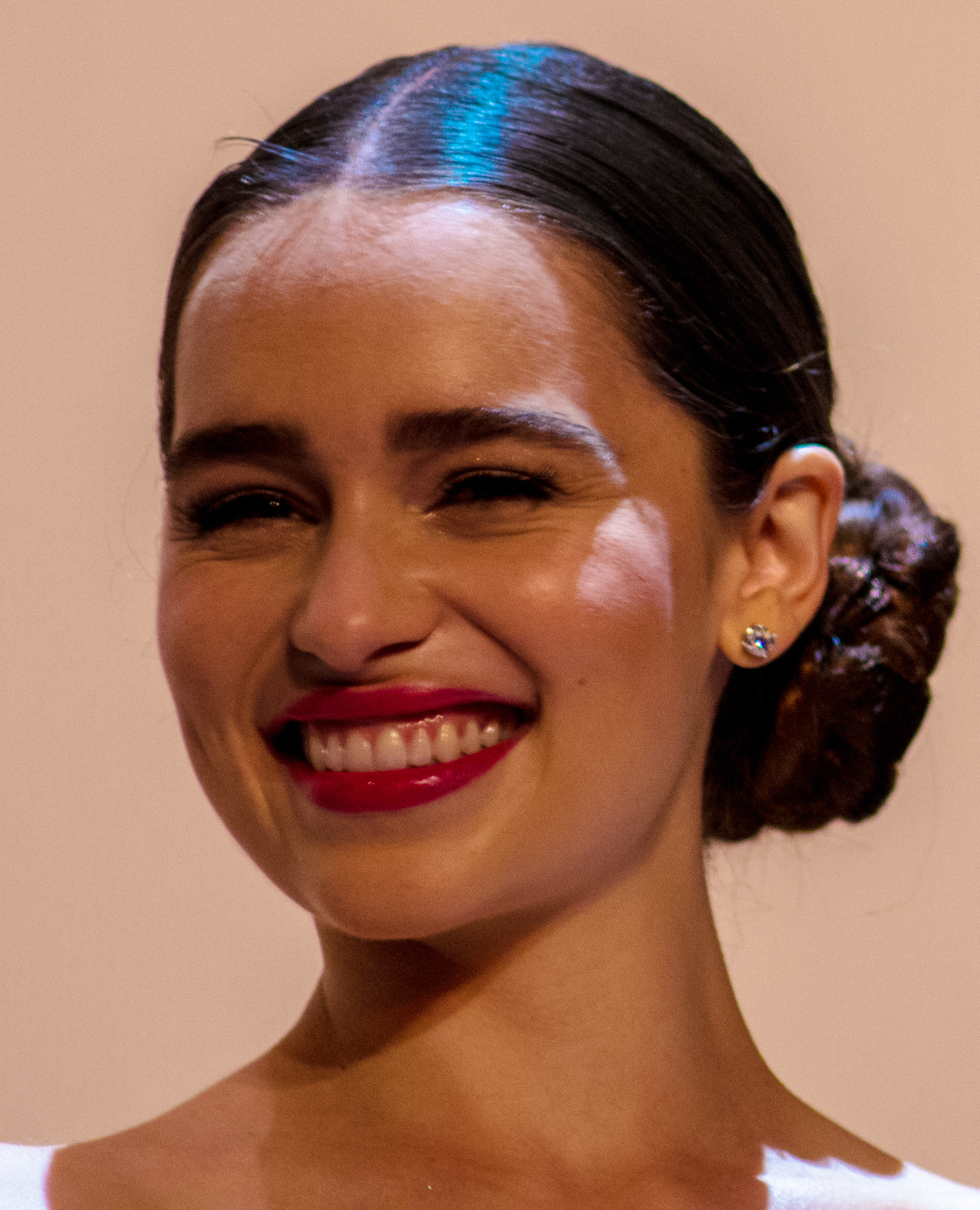
Actress Emilia Clarke wearing a braided side bun

An updo is a hairstyle that involves arranging the hair so that it is carried high on the head. It can be as simple as a ponytail, but is more commonly associated with more elaborate styles intended for special occasions such as proms or weddings.

Tight or frequent braiding may pull at the hair roots and cause traction alopecia. Rubber bands with metal clasps or tight clips, which bend the hair shaft at extreme angles, can have the same effect.

If hair is pinned too tightly, or the whole updo slips causing pulling on the hair in the follicle at the hair root, it can cause aggravation to the hair follicle and result in headaches. Although some people of African heritage may use braiding extensions (long term braiding hairstyle) as a form of convenience and/or as a reflection of personal style, it is important not to keep the braids up longer than needed to avoid hair breakage or hair loss. Proper braiding technique and maintenance can result in no hair damage even with repeated braid styles.

=== Curling and straightening ===
Curling and straightening hair typically involve using a curling iron or a flat iron to achieve the desired look. These tools use heat to shape the hair into various waves and curls, or to temporarily straighten it by reversing natural curls. However, frequent use of heat styling tools can damage hair, especially when combined with chemicals used to maintain the style. Some irons are designed to style damp hair, but they require higher temperatures, ranging from 300 to 450 °F (149 to 232 °C). To minimize heat damage, it's advisable to use heat protection sprays and hair-repairing shampoos and conditioners.

== Industry ==
Hair styling is a major world industry, from the salon itself to products, advertising, and even magazines on the subject. In the United States, most hairstylists are licensed after obtaining training at a cosmetology or beauty school.

In recent years, competitive events for professional stylists have grown in popularity. Stylists compete on deadline to create the most elaborate hairstyle using props, lights and other accessories.

=== Tools ===
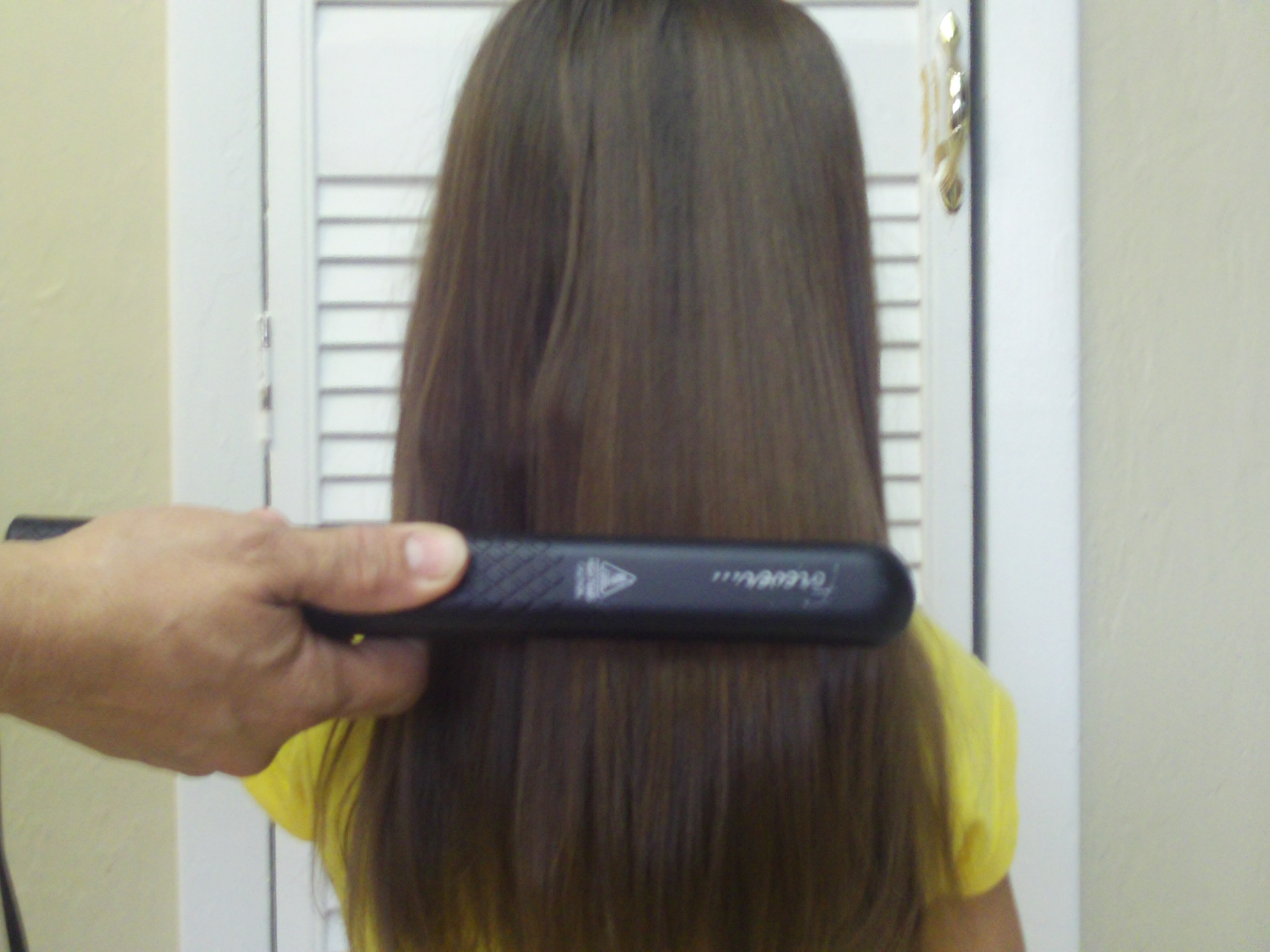
Hair being straightened with a hair iron

Styling tools may include hair irons (including flat, curling, and crimping irons), hair dryers, hair brushes and hair rollers. Hair dressing might also include the use of hair products to add texture, shine, curl, volume or hold to a particular style. Hairpins are also used when creating particular hairstyles. Their uses and designs vary over different cultural backgrounds.

=== Products ===
Styling products aside from shampoo and conditioner are many and varied. Leave-in conditioner, conditioning treatments, mousse, gels, lotions, waxes, creams, clays, serums, oils, and sprays are used to change the texture or shape of the hair, or to hold it in place in a certain style. Applied properly, most styling products will not damage the hair apart from drying it out; most styling products contain alcohols, which can dissolve oils. Many hair products contain chemicals which can cause build-up, resulting in dull hair or a change in perceived texture.

=== Wigs ===
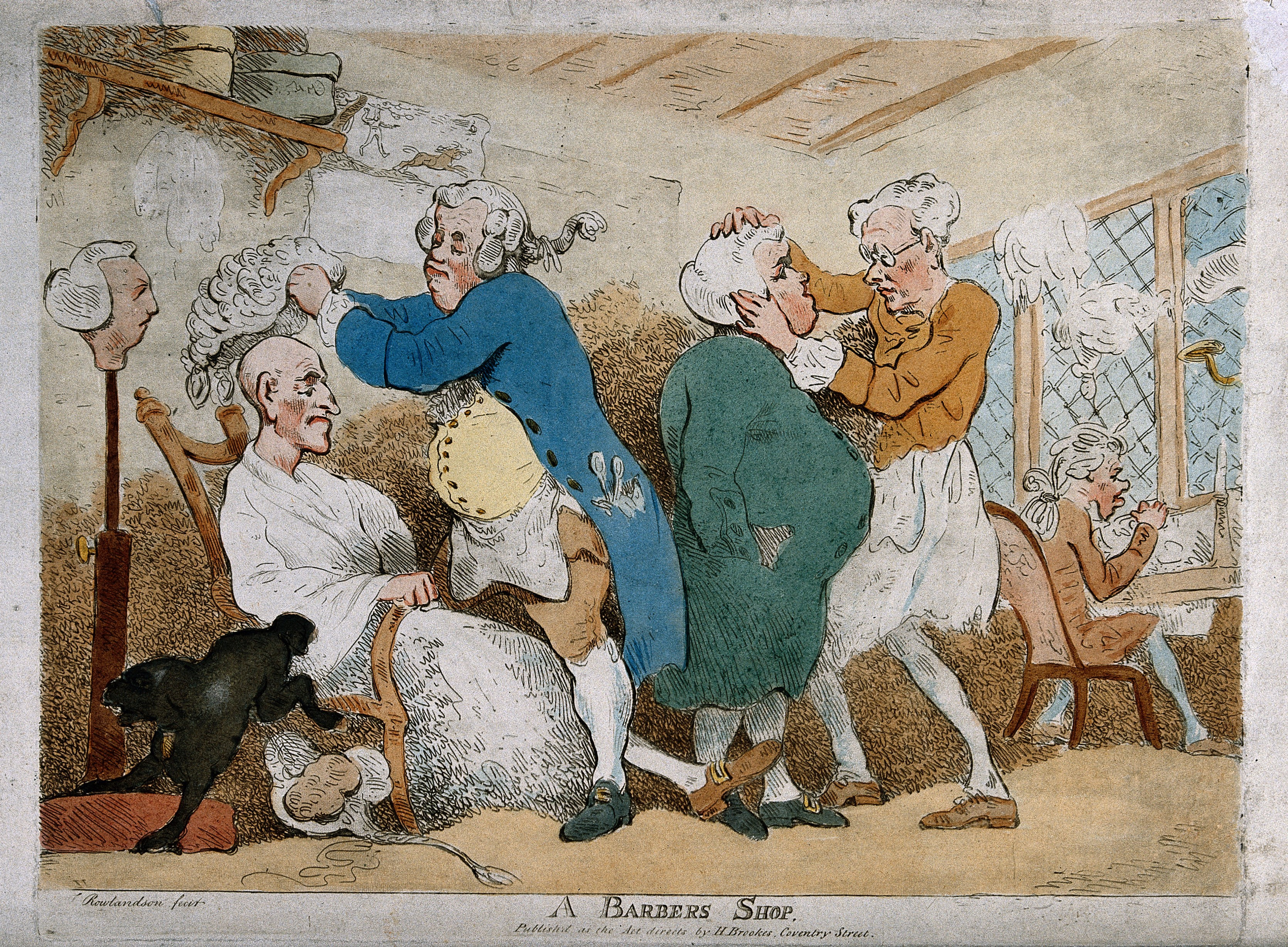
In the late 18th century and early 19th century, powdered wigs were popular

Care of human or other natural hair wigs is similar to care of a normal head of hair in that the wig can be brushed, styled, and kept clean using haircare products. Wigs can serve as a form of protective styling that allows freedom of control of the hairstyling.

Synthetic wigs are usually made from a fine fiber that mimics human hair. This fiber can be made in almost any color and hairstyle, and is often glossier than human hair. However, this fiber is sensitive to heat and cannot be styled with flat irons or curling irons. There is a newer synthetic fiber that can take heat up to a certain temperature.

Human hair wigs can be styled with heat, and they must be brushed only when dry. Synthetic and human hair wigs should be brushed dry before shampooing to remove tangles. To clean the wig, the wig should be dipped into a container with water and mild shampoo, then dipped in clear water and moved up and down to remove excess water. The wig must then be air dried naturally into its own hairstyle. Proper maintenance can make a human hair wig last for many years.

=== Functional and decorative ornaments ===
There are many options to embellish and arrange the hair. Hairpins, clasps, barrettes, headbands, ribbons, rubber bands, scrunchies, and combs can be used to achieve a variety of styles. There are also many decorative ornaments that, while they may have clasps to affix them to the hair, are used solely for appearance and do not aid in keeping the hair in place. In India for example, the Gajra (flower garland) is common there are heaps on hair.

== Social and cultural implications ==
=== Gender ===
At most times in most cultures, men have worn their hair in styles that are different from women's. American sociologist Rose Weitz wrote that the most widespread cultural rule about hair is that women's hair must differ from men's hair. In western societies – particularly the US, UK, and Canada – hair on the head is more strongly tied to feminine gender expression. Long hair is seen as not only feminine but also more sexually appealing for women. Women are also more likely to style their hair in a variety of ways, including using accessories. Meanwhile, men's styles tend to be uniform amongst one another. Masculine gender expressions tend to gear towards facial hair rather than head hair, likely due to how many men experience baldness. An exception is the men and women living in the Orinoco-Amazon Basin, where traditionally both genders have worn their hair cut into a bowl shape. In Western countries in the 1960s, both young men and young women wore their hair long and natural, and since then it has become more common for men to grow their hair.

During most periods in human history when men and women wore similar hairstyles, as in the 1920s and 1960s, it has generated significant social concern and approbation. In the west, groups such as hippies and punks caused outrage for their overlaps in masculine and feminine presentation. Around the 1950s onward, feminists in the US opposed traditionally feminine beauty standards of long hair and little or no body hair. They argued that those standards take much effort to maintain and were symbols of oppression, though the specifics of what sort of hairstyles or other beauty norms are "oppressive" was highly debated. Typically, many have aimed towards styles which take less maintenance. Meanwhile, there are also non-political examples of challenging gender presentation with performers presenting as cross-dressing or with androgynous appearances.

=== Religion ===
Hair in religion also plays an important role since women and men, when deciding to dedicate their life to faith, often change their haircut. Baldness is likely chosen as a common spiritual symbol of dedication because it is perceived as a sign of aging and thus, undesirable. Cutting or shaving one's hair is a rejection of worldly pride and vanity. There may be another layer of giving up sexuality as well, as hair is seen as a sex symbol, so the inverse of little or no hair could be a symbol of celibacy – a common oath for holy people. Catholic nuns often cut their hair very short, and men who joined Catholic monastic orders in the eighth century adopted what was known as the tonsure, which involved shaving the tops of their heads and leaving a ring of hair around the bald crown. Many Buddhists, Hajj pilgrims and Vaisnavas, especially members of the Hare Krishna movement who are brahmacharis or sannyasis, shave their heads. Some Hindu and most Buddhist monks and nuns shave their heads upon entering their order, and Korean Buddhist monks and nuns have their heads shaved every 15 days.

Conversely, there are also practices of keeping the hair long and/or uncut. One such example are adherents of Sikhism are required to wear their hair unshorn. Women usually wear it in a braid or a bun and men cover it with a turban also known as a dastār. Other religions also have various kinds of head coverings. The three Abrahamic religions, for instance all have some sort of religious writing on head coverings, particularly for women. In Islam women wear the hijab for modesty and covers the hair as well as chest. In Judaism (mostly orthodox), married women wear coverings such as the tichel, and in some branches men wear the kippah mostly in prayers. Meanwhile, due to the varied branches of Christianity, not all Christian women wear coverings and there are various kinds of head covering.

=== Marital status ===
In the 1800s, American women started wearing their hair up when they became ready to get married. Among the Fulani people of west Africa, unmarried women wear their hair ornamented with small amber beads and coins, while married women wear large amber ornaments. Marriage is signified among the Toposa women of South Sudan by wearing the hair in many small pigtails. Unmarried Hopi women have traditionally worn a "butterfly" hairstyle characterized by a twist or whorl of hair at each side of the face. Hindu widows in India used to shave their heads as part of their mourning although that practice has mostly disappeared.

=== Life transitions ===
In many cultures, including Hindu culture and among the Wayana people of the Guiana highlands, young people have historically shaved off their hair to denote coming-of-age. Women in India historically have signified adulthood by switching from wearing two braids to one. Among the Rendille of north-eastern Kenya and the Tchikrin people of the Brazilian rainforest, both men and women shave their heads after the death of a close family member. When a man died in ancient Greece, his wife cut off her hair and buried it with him, and in Hindu families, the chief mourner is expected to shave his or her head 3 days after the death.

=== Social class ===
Upper-class people have always used their hairstyles to signal wealth and status. Wealthy Roman women wore complex hairstyles that needed the labours of several people to maintain them, and rich people have also often chosen hairstyles that restricted or burdened their movement, making it obvious that they did not need to work. Wealthy people's hairstyles used to be at the cutting edge of fashion, setting the styles for the less wealthy. But today, the wealthy are generally observed to wear their hair in conservative styles that date back decades prior.

Middle-class hairstyles tend to be understated and professional. Middle-class people aspire to have their hair look healthy and natural, implying that they have the resources to live a healthy lifestyle and take good care of themselves.

European-influenced working-class people's haircuts have tended to be somewhat simple. Working-class men have often shaved their heads or worn their hair close-cropped. While working-class women typically with long hair often have their hair cinched back away from their faces and secured on their scalp.

=== Health ===
Hair, when it is natural and meets certain criteria, is one of the indicators of a person's good or poor health. This is one of the explanations for the significant role that hairstyles play in both sexual and emotional attraction.

In the past, certain products used for hair graying (such as lead oxide or lead combs) have been a source of lead poisoning. Hair is sensitive to air pollution, particularly to various metallic pollutants in the environment (such as lead, mercury, or arsenic). These metals can also be absorbed through food and beverages, as hair bioconcentrates and stores them from the bloodstream to the skin. Additionally, certain medications can lead to hair loss, and this may be worsened by specific hairstyles.

According to a study published in 2016 by the American Academy of Dermatology and notably reported by The Root and Science magazine, certain tightly braided hairstyles that exert significant and constant tension on the scalp can contribute to a specific form of alopecia known as traction alopecia (TA). This article categorized hairstyling practices into high, moderate, and low-risk categories of induced alopecia, enabling dermatologists and physicians to provide more precise advice to affected patients.

This is the case with common hairstyles among African-American women, including extensions, braids, and dreadlocks. This may explain why approximately one-third of black women suffer from hair loss. Hair damage can be further exacerbated by the use of chemical products used for chemical straightening. The study's findings support recommendations to wear looser hairstyles and avoid keeping braids and extensions for more than a few months.

Certain products (hair dyes, hairsprays, bleaches, etc.) may contain allergenic ingredients. Several studies suggest that certain hairstyles or the use of bleaching or dyeing products may increase the risk of certain cancers (melanomas, as well as carcinomas); thus, long and dark hair that shades the skin and protects it from excessive ultraviolet exposure could be a protective factor against certain skin cancers (such as ear cancers).

== Haircuts in space ==
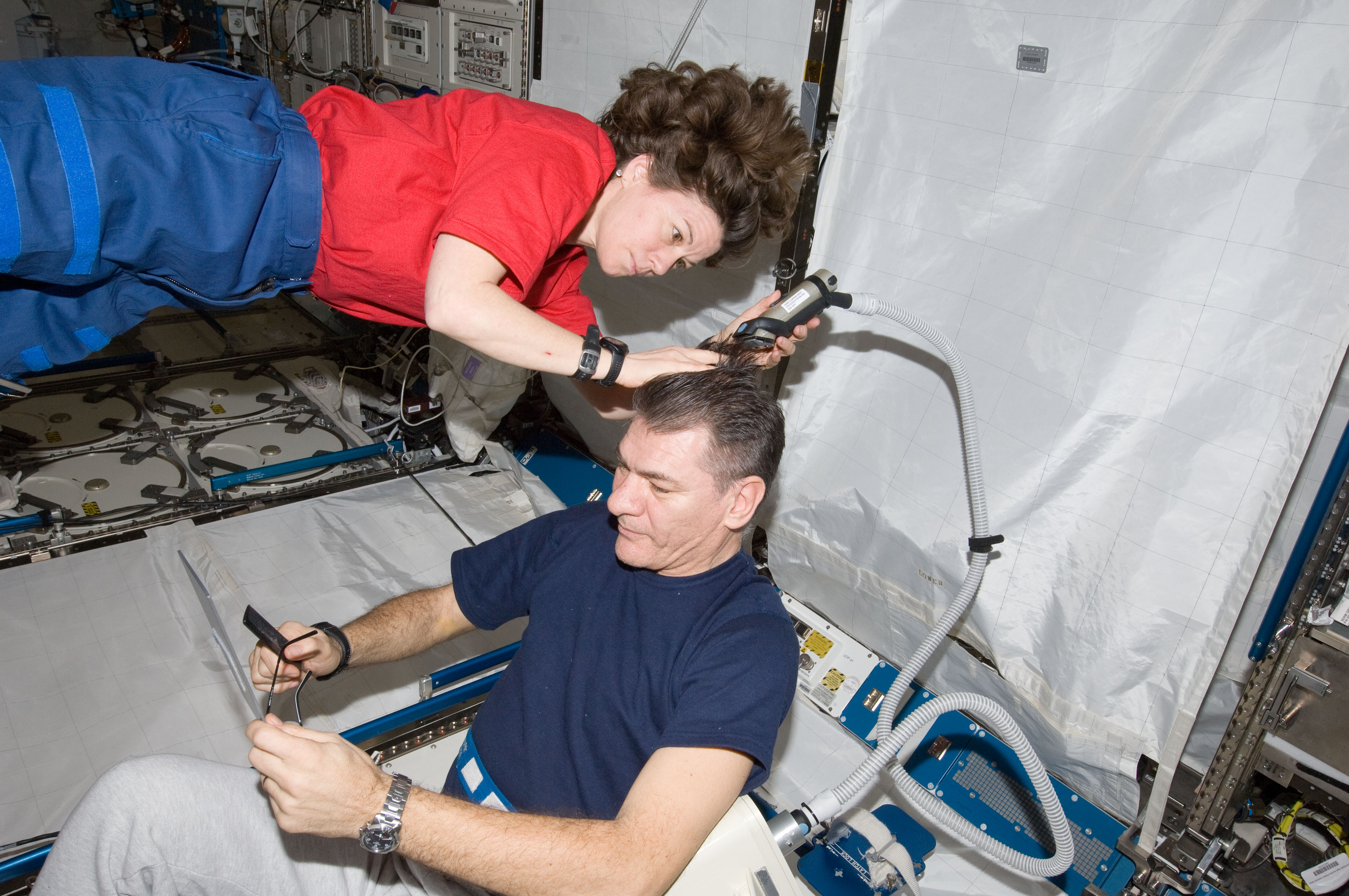
NASA astronaut Catherine (Cady) Coleman trims the hair of Paolo Nespoli in the Kibō laboratory on the International Space Station during Expedition 26. A hair clipper attached to a vacuum cleaner removes free-floating hair clippings.

Haircuts also occur in the International Space Station. During the various expeditions astronauts use hair clippers attached to vacuum devices for grooming their colleagues so that the cut hair will not drift inside the weightless environment of the space station and become a nuisance to the astronauts or a hazard to the sensitive equipment installations inside the station.

Haircutting in space was also used for charitable purposes in the case of astronaut Sunita Williams who obtained such a haircut by fellow astronaut Joan Higginbotham inside the International Space Station. Sunita's ponytail was brought back to earth with the STS-116 crew and was donated to Locks of Love.

== See also ==
- Asymmetric cut
- Eponymous hairstyle
- Historical Christian hairstyles
- List of hairstyles
- Regular haircut
- Roman hairstyles
- Osadia
- Hair loss
