= Ghazala Khan =

Ghazala Khan may refer to:

- Gazala Shaikh Khan, known as Gajala, an Indian film actress
- Honour killing of Ghazala Khan (1987–2005), Danish woman who was shot and killed in Denmark by her brother after she married against the will of the family
- Khizr and Ghazala Khan, parents of United States Army Captain Humayun Khan, who was killed in 2004 during the Iraq War

== See also ==
- Ghazal (disambiguation)
