= Osadía =

Street theatre company in Barcelona, Spain

Osadía ("Audacity" in Spanish) is a street theatre company formed in Barcelona, Spain in 1966 by artist Alex Rendon and featuring hair art.

== Style of show ==
Osadia perform an innovative concept of hair art. Artists actively seek the audience participation - by asking for volunteers to have their hair 'done'. Each volunteer is invited to take a seat and let the artists use their imagination, creating daring and original hairstyles.

They also use various objects which have been made for the event, and these are placed on the heads of the participants. The head sculptures are inspired in the theme of the festival or event. Once finished, the ‘creation’ is a visual reminder of the event.

== Performances ==
Osadia have performed at many venues, including the 1998 World Expo in Lisbon, the Edinburgh Fringe Festival - as well as venues across England, France, USA, Japan, Germany Spain and Italy.

Tollwood Festival, Munich / Sydney Mardi Gras, Australia / Trafalgar Square Festival, London, UK / Juste pour rire/Just for laughs, Montreal, Canada / The Esplanade Festival, Singapore / NZ International Festival, Wellington, New Zealand / Kleines Fest im Grossen Garten, Hanover / Daidogei World Cup, Shizuoka, Japan / Hogmanay, Edinburgh, Scotland / Festes de la Mercè, Barcelona

== Press articles ==
"In Wellington, Art has gone to people´s heads." CNN. The Art Club

"OSADIA gathered crowds as they performed free psychedelic hairdos..." The Times

"..they are incredibly creative and quick (...) All hairdressers should try and see them -they are stunningly good." The Scotsman

"for those brave enough to take a seat in the barber´s chair, artistic duo will create weird, wild and wonderful hair sculptures using creative and innovative concepts of hairdressing. The less brave can simply watch the frantic creations take shape before their eyes." City of Sydney Times.

"...recklessly, I add myself to the onlookers who watch the mind-boggling hairdressing performance of Osadia." Mercedes Abad. El País

"Bewilderment and amazement (...). The "daring" of a special salon that works live." Santiago Fondevila. La Vanguardia

"Osadia´s repertoire includes performance as well as visual art. The show unfolds on a stage with two barber´s chairs and mirrors. The "hair sculptors" play up to the crowd in make up, costumes and theatrical headgear." The Dominion. Wellington. New Zealand

"This act, all the way from sunny Spain, were another favourite with the crowds. They create fantastically strange hairdo's on willing and brave audience members using a variety of materials and coloured sprays" BBC
