= Ghazala Shaheen =

Politician

Member of the Provincial Assembly of the Punjab
- In office 29 May 2013 – 31 May 2018
- Constituency: Reserved seat for women

Personal details
- Born: 1 February 1981 (age 45) Haroonabad, Bahawalnagar
- Party: Pakistan Muslim League (Z) (until 2023)

Ghazala Shaheen (Urdu: غزالہ شاہین; born 1 February 1981) is a Pakistani politician who was a Member of the Provincial Assembly of the Punjab, from May 2013 to May 2018.

== Early life and education ==
Ghazala was born on 1 February 1981 in Haroonabad, Bahawalnagar.

She has completed intermediate level education.

== Political career ==
She was elected to the Provincial Assembly of the Punjab as a candidate of Pakistan Muslim League (Z) on a reserved seat for women in the 2013 Pakistani general election.
