= Ghazala Rafique =

Pakistani actress (1939–1977)

- غزالہ رفيق
- Born: Bilquis Ansari; 1939; Qamber Ali Khan, Sindh, Pakistan
- Died: 1977 (aged 37–38); Karachi, Pakistan
- Occupations: Actress, Radio/tv Hostess
- Years active: 1957–1977
- Known for: Subah Dam Khawer Darwaza Khula (Urdu: صبحدم دروازہ خاور کھلا), (Radio); Zeenat(tv); Rat Ja Rishta (Film)
- Children: 3

Ghazala Rafique (Sindhi/Urdu: غزالہ رفيق 1977 – 1939) was a Pakistani actress. She was also a singer and hostess of Radio Pakistan Karachi.

== Biography ==
Rafique was born in 1939, in Qamber Ali Khan, District Larkana (now Qamber-Shahdadkot District). Her birth name was Bilquis Ansari. She was niece of renowned Sindhi language writer Usman Ali Ansari.

Rafique began her singing and acting career at Radio Pakistan Karachi in 1957. Ghazala Rafiq's talents were noticed by the then-renowned broadcaster Zulfiqar Ali Bukhari, who encouraged her to also participate in radio programs as a hostess and drama artist. Her first Urdu radio play was Aag, which was produced by Zahid Naqvi. Afterward, she played leading roles in numerous other radio plays.

On the radio, Rafique learned music from renowned musicians Amrao Bundu Khan and Master Muhammad Ibrahim. In the 1960s, she was part of Radio Pakistan Karachi, and hosted the program Subah Dam Khawer Darwaza e Khula (Urdu: صبحدم دروازہ خاور کھلا).

Rafique also acted in Sindhi film Rat Ja Rishta.

== Urdu Plays ==
Ghazala Rafique acted in scores of Urdu plays and serials of Pakistan Television (PTV) Karachi Centre. Her most popular plays/serials are listed below:

- Mein Kaun Hoon? (Urdu: میں کون ہوں)
- Aye Ham Nafso (Urdu: ا ئے ہم نفسو)
- Akhiri Mom Batti (Urdu: آخری موم بتی)
- Mirza Ghalib (Urdu: مرزا غالب )
- Pat Jhar kay Baad (Urdu: پت جھڑکے بعد)
- Gudiya Ghar (Urdu: گڑیا گھر )

== Sindhi Plays ==
She was one of the most popular actresses of Sindhi TV plays until her sudden death in 1977. Some of her memorable Sindhi language serials include the following:

- Zeenat (Sindhi: زينت)
- Mau (Sindhi: ماءُ)
- Umar Marvi (Sindhi: عمرمارئي)
- Sassi Punhu (Sindhi: سسئي پنھون)
- Noori Jam Tamachi (Sindhi: نوري ڄام تماچي)
- Leela Chanesar (Sindhi: ليلا چنيسر)
- Pachha and Parlau (Sindhi: پاڇا ۽ پڙلاءُ)
- Oondah Aen Roshni (Sindhi: اوندھ ۽ روشني)
