= Hinduism and Christianity =

Hindu–Christian relations are mixed. Hinduism's historical tendency has been to recognize the divine basis of various other religions, and to revere their founders and saintly practitioners; this continues today. The declaration Nostra aetate by the Second Vatican Council officially established inter-religious dialogue between Catholics and Hindus, promoting common values between the two religions (among others). There are over 17.3 million Catholics in India, which represents less than 2% of the total population, still making it the largest Christian church in India.

== History ==
=== Saint Thomas Christians ===
Although little is known of the immediate growth of the church, Bar-Daisan (154–223 CE) reports that in his time there were Christian tribes in North India which claimed to have been converted by Thomas and to have books and relics to prove it.

Saint Thomas Christians typically followed the social customs of their Hindu neighbours, and the vestiges of Hindu symbolism could be seen in their devotional practices. Social sins like untouchability entered their practices and the Synod of Diamper abolished it. The sacraments related to birth, marriage, pregnancy, death, and other things also adapted nuances from Hindu religious practices. Even today, tying Minnu, a Hindu symbol of marriage, is the most important rite in Christian marriages as well. In 1519, Portuguese traveler Duarte Barbosa, on his visit to Malabar, commented on the practice of Saint Thomas Christian priests using Kudumi similar to that of Hindus in his manuscript "Book of Duarte Barbosa".

In the social stratification of medieval Malabar, Saint Thomas Christians succeeded in relating their social status with that of upper-caste Hindus on account of their numerical strength and influence and observance of many Brahmin and upper caste customs. In the 13th and 14th centuries, many Saint Thomas Christians were involved in the pepper trade for the local rulers and many were appointed as port revenue officers. The local rulers rewarded them with grants of land and many other privileges. With growing numerical strength, a large number of Saint Thomas Christians settled in the inland pepper-growing regions. They had the right to recruit and train soldiers and Christian trainers were given the honorary title "Panikkar" like their Nair counterparts. They were also entitled with the privilege to collect taxes, and tax collectors were honored with the title "Tharakan".

Like Brahmins, they had the right to sit before kings and ride on horses or elephants like the royals. They were protectors of seventeen underprivileged castes and communities, hence they were called Lords of Seventeen Castes. They did not allow the lower castes to join their community for fear that it could imperil their upper-caste status. This regal period ended when the community fell under the power of the Rajas of Cochin and Travancore. They owned a large number of Kalaripayattu training centers and the Rajas of Travancore and Cochin, including the renowned Marthanda Varma, recruited trained Christian warriors to defend their kingdom.

The upper-caste Hindus and Saint Thomas Christians took part in one another's festival celebrations and in some places in Kerala, the Hindu temples and Saint Thomas Christian churches were built on adjoining sites by the Hindu kings. Until the 19th century, Saint Thomas Christians had the right of access to Hindu temples, and some leading Saint Thomas Christians held the status of sponsors at Hindu shrines and temple festivals. But in the 19th century, Saint Thomas Christian integration with the Hindu caste system was disrupted: their clean-caste status was questioned in some localities, and they were denied access to many Hindu temples. They tried to retaliate by denouncing Hindu festivals as heathen idolatry. Clashes between upper-caste Hindus and Saint Thomas Christians occurred from the late 1880s, especially when festivals coincided. Internecine violence among various Saint Thomas Christian denominations aggravated their problems.

=== Goa under Portuguese colonial rule ===
The Goa Inquisition was established in 1560, briefly stopped from 1774 to 1778, and was re-instated and continued until it was finally abolished in 1812. Like the Spanish Inquisition and the Portuguese Inquisition before it, the original targets behind the creation of the Goa Inquisition were falsely-converted Sephardic Jews and North African Muslims who had emigrated to Goa from the Iberian peninsula, while lying about being Catholic. These two communities were perceived as a security threat due to their established reputation for joining forces to overthrow Christian rulers in the Iberian peninsula. Some native Goans were also accused, arrested and tried for being crypto-Hindus. Those accused of it were imprisoned and depending on the criminal charge, could even be sentenced to death if convicted.

The Inquisitors also seized and burned books written in Sanskrit, Dutch, English, or Konkani, as they were suspected of containing teachings that deviated from Catholic doctrine or promoted Protestant, Hindu or Muslim ideas. The Inquisitors aimed ensure Catholic teachings were absolutely enforced. The Inquisition also prosecuted violators observing Hindu or Muslim rituals or festivals, and persons who interfered with Portuguese attempts to convert local Muslims and Hindus. Although the Goa Inquisition ended in 1812, discrimination against non-Catholics under Portuguese rule continued in other forms such as the Xenddi tax implemented from 1705 to 1840, which was similar to the Jizya tax. Religious discrimination ended with the introduction of secularism, via the Portuguese Constitution of 1838 and the subsequent Portuguese Civil Code of Goa and Damaon.

==== Cuncolim Revolt ====
On 15 July 1583, Hindu chieftains in the Portuguese Goa village of Cuncolim massacred and mutilated five Jesuit priests, one Portuguese civilian, and 14 Goan Catholics. The local Portuguese garrison retaliated by executing the village chieftains involved and destroying the economic infrastructure of Cuncolim.

=== Interfaith relations in modern India ===
==== Conversion controversies ====
Communal disharmony arose even before Indian independence in 1947 on the aforementioned issue of religious conversion. Conversions have been legislated by the provisions of the Freedom of Religion Acts, laws which were replicated in numerous other regions in India. Odisha was one of the first provinces of India after its independence to enact legislation with regards to religious conversions. The Orissa Freedom of Religion Act, 1967, mentions that no person shall "convert or attempt to convert, either directly or otherwise, any person from one religious faith to another by the use of force or by inducement or by any fraudulent means". Christian missions have been active in Odisha among the tribals and backward Hindu castes from the early years of the twentieth century. Right-wing Hindus have alleged that the increase in the number of Christians in Odisha has been a result of an exploitation of illiteracy and impoverishment by the missionaries in contravention of the law, instead of free will.

Behind the clashes are long-simmering tensions between equally impoverished groups: the Kandha tribe (who are 80% of the population) and the Panas (ପାଣ), which are both original inhabitants of the land. There has been an Indian tradition of untouchability. Dalits, considered lower caste people, are subject to social and economic discrimination, which is outlawed in the Indian constitution, however, the prejudices remain. Conversion from untouchability has encouraged millions of such people to escape from their circumstances by joining other religions. The Panas have converted to Christianity in large numbers and prospered financially. Over the past several decades, most of the Panas have become Dalit Christians.

==== Anti-Christian violence ====
Indian Christians were relatively unaffected by communal violence until the end of the 1990s and enjoyed social harmony with their majority Hindu neighbours. However, the late 1990s saw a significant increase in acts of anti-Christian violence, and the year 1998 was the tipping point. In the ensuing years, they were denounced in anti-Christian propaganda and they were targeted for violence by Hindu nationalist groups which wanted to prevent tribal voters and lower-caste voters from converting to Christianity. In March 1998, the Hindutva Bharatiya Janata Party (BHJ) took power, after which anti-Christian violence dramatically increased.

Historically, the BJP and the Hindu nationalistic Sangh Parivar organizations were more likely to accept violence against minorities than their rival the Indian National Congress. In most reported cases, the named perpetrators are members of the Sangh Parivar organisations, small subgroups that formed under the umbrella of the Rashtriya Swayamsevak Sangh (RSS), an umbrella organisation whose roots date back to 1925. The RSS, who promote a form of nationalism, oppose the spread of "foreign religions" like Islam and Christianity.

The Human Rights Watch report stated that Vishva Hindu Parishad (VHP), Bajrang Dal, and RSS (the sister organisations of the BJP) are the most accused organizations for violence against Christians in India. Although these organizations differ significantly in many ways, they have all argued that, since Hindus make up the bulk of Indians, India should be a Hindu state. RSS volunteers are taught to believe that India is a nation solely for the Hindus and that Hindus have suffered at the hands of invaders, notably Muslim rulers and British Christians. Human Rights Watch reported that the attacks against Christians are part of the Sangh Parivar organizations' orchestrated effort to encourage and exploit sectarian violence to raise their political power base.

== See also ==
- Christianity and other religions
- Hinduism and other religions
- Dalit theology
- Gullipilli Sowria Raj v. Bandaru Pavani
- Journal of Hindu-Christian Studies

Syncretic movements:

- Caribbean Tamil Christianity
- Christian ashram movement
- Expeditus § Réunion Island
- Maldevidan Spiritism
- Saint Sarah
