= Hairband =

Hairband may refer to:

- Hair tie, an item used to fasten hair
- Headband, a clothing accessory worn in the hair or around the forehead, usually to hold hair away from the face or eyes
- Hair band, a band that plays hair metal or glam metal, a subgenre of heavy metal music
