= Pavani =

Pavani may refer to:

- Pavani (raga), a rāga in Carnatic music
- Pavani Parameswara Rao (1933–2017), Indian lawyer
- Pavani Reddy, Indian model and actress
- Gullipilli Sowria Raj v. Bandaru Pavani, an Indian Supreme Court ruling in a lawsuit involving the legality of the marriage to a Hindu woman of a Christian
- Andrea Pavani (born 1954), Italian curler
- Enea Pavani (1920–1998), Italian curler
- Pavani, character in the 2005 Indian film Vennela
