= Christianity and colonialism =

Role of Christianity in European colonialism

Christianity and colonialism are associated with each other by some ideas, because of the service of Christianity, in its various denominations (namely Protestantism, Catholicism and Eastern Orthodoxy), as the state religion of the historical European colonial powers in which Christians likewise made up the majority. In several regions, Christian missionaries acted as the "religious arms" of the imperialist powers of Europe, but oftentimes they also defended the rights of indigenous peoples.

According to the historian Edward E. Andrews, Christian missionaries were initially portrayed as "visible saints, exemplars of ideal piety in a sea of persistent savagery". However, by the time the colonial era drew to a close in the later half of the 20th century, missionaries were critically viewed as "ideological shock troops for colonial invasion whose zealotry blinded them", colonialism's "agent, scribe and moral alibi". Meanwhile, "differing South Asian groups who enthusiastically embraced Christianity have been mocked as dupes of Western imperialists" and criticized as being "separatist minded by their initial communities."

In some regions, segments of a colony's population were forcibly converted from earlier belief systems to the Christian faith, which colonial regimes used to legitimize the suppression of adherents of other faiths, enslavement of colonial subjects, and exploitation of land and maritime resources. Christians and Christian institutions around the world, however, also participated in anti-colonial and decolonization movements and were themselves transformed in the process.

== Background ==
Christianity is associated by some with the impacts of colonialism because religion was a justification among the motives of colonists. For example, Toyin Falola asserts that there were some missionaries who believed that "the agenda of colonialism in Africa was similar to that of Christianity". Falola cites Jan H. Boer of the Sudan United Mission as saying, "Colonialism is a form of imperialism based on a divine mandate and designed to bring liberation – spiritual, cultural, economic and political – by sharing the blessings of the Christ-inspired civilization of the West with a people suffering under satanic oppression, ignorance and disease, effected by a combination of political, economic and religious forces that cooperate under a regime seeking the benefit of both ruler and ruled."

Edward Andrews writes:

Historians have traditionally looked at Christian missionaries in one of two ways. The first church historians to catalogue missionary history provided hagiographic descriptions of their trials, successes, and sometimes even martyrdom. Missionaries were thus visible saints, exemplars of ideal piety in a sea of persistent savagery. However, by the middle of the twentieth century, an era marked by civil rights movements, anti-colonialism, and growing secularization, missionaries were viewed quite differently. Instead of godly martyrs, historians now described missionaries as arrogant and rapacious imperialists. Christianity became not a saving grace but a monolithic and aggressive force that missionaries imposed upon defiant natives. Indeed, missionaries were now understood as important agents in the ever-expanding nation-state, or "ideological shock troops for colonial invasion whose zealotry blinded them."

According to Lamin Sanneh, "Much of the standard Western scholarship on Christian missions proceeds by looking at the motives of individual missionaries and concludes by faulting the entire missionary enterprise as being part of the machinery of Western cultural imperialism." As an alternative to that view, Sanneh presents a different perspective arguing that "missions in the modern era have been far more, and far less, than the argument about motives customarily portrayed."

Michael Wood asserts that during the 16th century, it was almost impossible for the indigenous peoples to be considered human beings in their own right and that the conquistadors brought with them the baggage of "centuries of ethnocentrism, and Christian monotheism, which espoused one truth, one time and version of reality."

== Age of Discovery ==
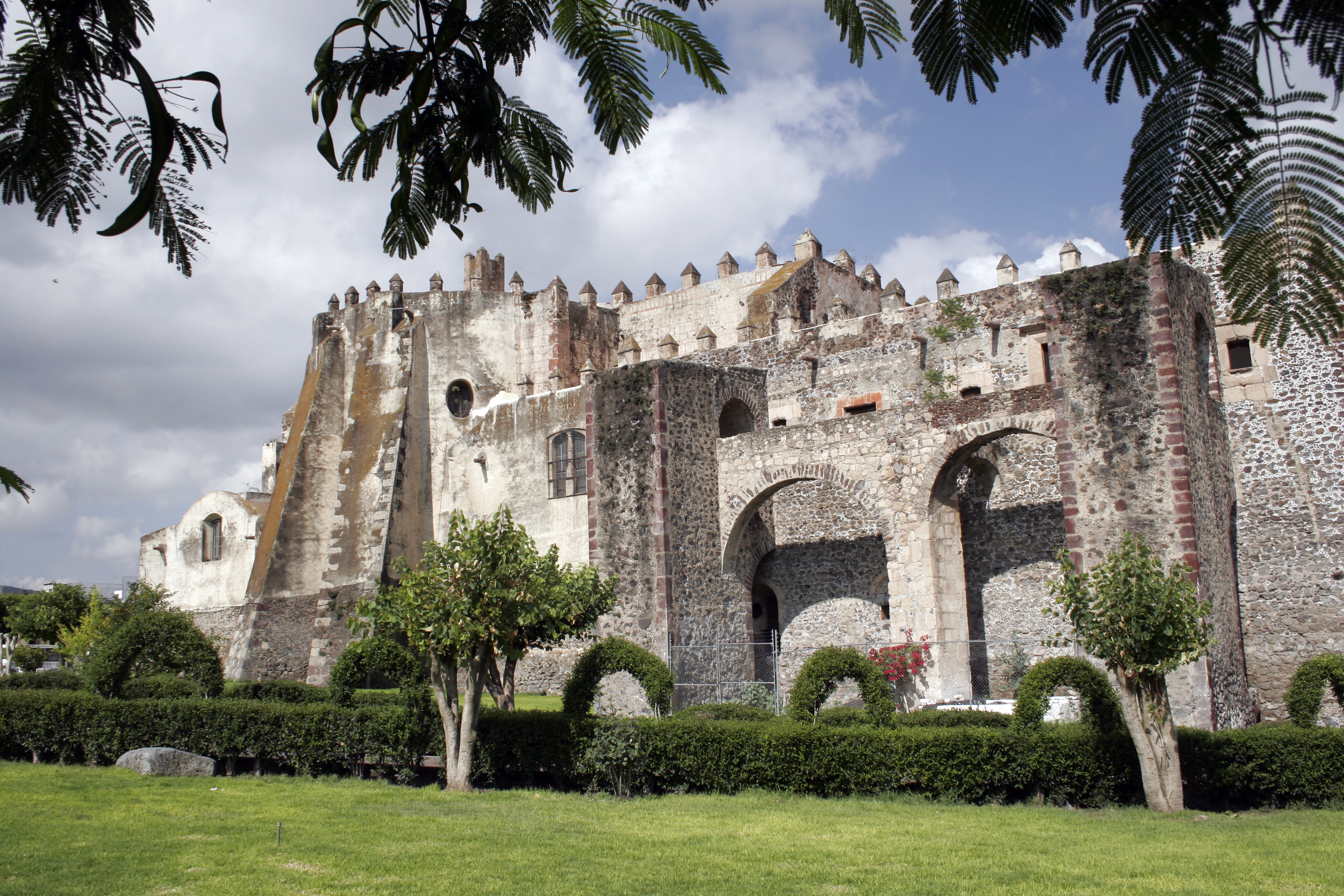
The convent of San Augustin. A mission centre established at Yuriria, Mexico, in 1550.

During the Age of Discovery, the Catholic Church inaugurated a major effort to spread Christianity in the New World and to convert the Native Americans and other indigenous people. The missionary effort was a major part of, and a partial justification for the colonial efforts of European powers such as Spain, France and Portugal. The idea of European exploration and Christian expansion were synonymous with each other as European Christians' religious views and settlements in new lands were a way to convert the indigenous peoples. Christian Missions to the indigenous peoples ran hand-in-hand with the colonial efforts of Catholic nations. In the Americas and other colonies in Asia and Africa, most missions were run by religious orders such as the Augustinians, Franciscans, Jesuits and Dominicans.

In both Portugal and Spain, religion was an integral part of the state, and Christianization was seen as having both secular and spiritual benefits. Portuguese explorers would propose ideas of venturing into new territories to religious executives, which were approved based on the idea that "honor and glory will befall not only all of Christendom but also … this most sacred See of Peter." Wherever those powers attempted to expand their territories or influence, missionaries would soon follow. By the Treaty of Tordesillas, the two powers divided the world between them into exclusive spheres of influence, trade and colonization. The Roman Catholic world order was challenged by the Netherlands and England. Theoretically, it was repudiated by Grotius's Mare Liberum. Portugal's and Spain's colonial policies were also challenged by the Roman Catholic Church itself. The Vatican founded the Congregatio de Propaganda Fide in 1622 and attempted to separate the churches from the influence of the Iberian kingdoms.

== Americas ==
Jan van Butselaar writes that "for Prince Henry the Navigator and his contemporaries, the colonial enterprise was based on the necessity to develop European commerce and the obligation to propagate the Christian faith."

Christian leaders and doctrines were under suspicion of justifying and perpetrating violence against Native Americans found in the New World.

=== Spanish missions ===
Adriaan van Oss wrote:

If we had to choose a single, irreducible idea underlying Spanish colonialism in the New World, it would undoubtedly be the propagation of the Catholic faith. Unlike such other European colonizing powers as England or the Netherlands, Spain insisted on converting the natives of the lands it conquered to its state religion. Miraculously, it succeeded. Introduced in the context of Iberian expansionism, Catholicism outlived the empire itself and continues to thrive, not as an anachronistic vestige among the elite, but as a vital current even in remote mountain villages. Catholic Christianity remains the principal colonial heritage of Spain in America. More than any set of economic relationships with the outside world, more even than the language first brought to America's shores in 1492, the Catholic religion continues to permeate Spanish-American culture today, creating an overriding cultural unity which transcends the political and national boundaries dividing the continent.

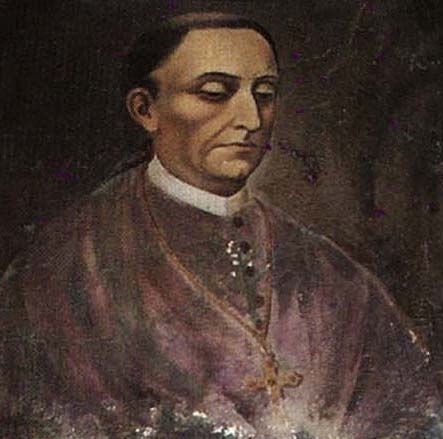
Diego de Landa, Spanish colonial Bishop of Yucatan and writer of important historical account of the Maya, ordered the burning of thousands Maya sacred and history texts.

The Spanish were the first of the future European countries to colonize North and South America. They came into the region predominantly through Cuba and Puerto Rico and into Florida. The Spaniards were committed, by Vatican decree, to convert their New World indigenous subjects to Catholicism. However, initial efforts (both docile and coerced) were often questionably successful, as the indigenous people added Catholicism into their longstanding traditional ceremonies and beliefs.

An example of the successful integration of Catholicism into longstanding beliefs is the change in the Incan religion. The Spaniards, especially, weaved Catholicism into Incan religious beliefs by altering the Andean religion to align more with Catholic teachings. That religious integration resulted from the idea that the Incan indigenous people were better Catholics than the Europeans who preached to them. The many native expressions, forms, practices, and items of art could be considered idolatry and prohibited or destroyed by Spanish missionaries, military, and civilians. They included religious items, sculptures, and jewelry made of gold or silver, which were melted down before shipment to Spain. That shows the ideology of the Spanish conquerors, who were motivated by God, gold, and glory.

The Spanish imposition of their cultural beliefs made some indigenous languages of the Americas evolve into replacing their native languages with Spanish, which are lost to today's tribal members. Priests who understood and could speak indigenous languages were more efficient in religious conversion by evangelizing in them. It was a collective effort by both groups to form a way of communication with each other as Quechua-speaking officials, and Andean officials learned Spanish.

In the early years, most mission work was undertaken by the religious orders. Over time, it was intended that a normal church structure would be established in the mission areas. The process began with the formation of special jurisdictions, known as apostolic prefectures and apostolic vicariates. The developing churches eventually graduated to regular diocesan status with the appointment of a local bishop. After decolonization, the process increased in pace as church structures altered to reflect new political-administrative realities.

Ralph Bauer describes the Franciscan missionaries as having been "unequivocally committed to Spanish imperialism, condoning the violence and coercion of the Conquest as the only viable method of bringing American natives under the saving rule of Christianity." Jordan writes "The catastrophe of Spanish America's rape at the hands of the Conquistadors remains one of the most potent and pungent examples in the entire history of human conquest of the wanton destruction of one culture by another in the name of religion".

Antonio de Montesinos, a Dominican friar on the island of Hispaniola, was the first member of the clergy to publicly denounce all forms of enslavement and oppression of the indigenous peoples of the Americas. Theologians such as Francisco de Vitoria and Bartolomé de las Casas drew up theological and philosophical bases for the defense of the human rights of the colonized native populations, thus creating the basis of international law, regulating the relationships between nations.

The Native Americans only gave way to the force of the European after they were overcome with the diseases the Europeans had spread. The Evangelization of the natives in the Americas began with private colonization. The Crown tried to establish rules to protect the natives against any unjust war of conquest. The Spanish could start a war against those who rejected the kings authority and who were aware and also rejected Christianity. There was a doctrine developed that allowed the conquest of natives if they were uncivilized.

Friars and Jesuits learned native languages instead of teaching the natives Spanish because they were trying to protect them from the colonists’ negative influences. In addition, the missionaries felt that it was important to show the positive aspects of the new religion to the natives after the epidemics and the harsh conquest that had just occurred.

=== French missions ===
The Jesuit order (the Society of Jesus) established missions among the Iroquois in North America by the 1650s–1660s. Their success in the study of indigenous languages Was appreciated by the Iroquois, who helped them expand into the Great Lakes region by 1675. Their order was banished from France in 1736, but they did not entirely disappear from North America, and an American diocese was established in 1804.

In the 1830s, Marist missionaries from the Catholic Society of Mary promoted missions to various Pacific islands in Oceania. The head of the order Friar Jean-Claude Colin and Bishop Jean-Baptiste-François Pompallier worked in close conjunction with the colonized imperialism and colony-building program of the French government. Trouble arose in Hawaii, where the local government strongly favored Protestant missionaries from the United States over the Picpusien Fathers, who had established a mission in Honolulu in 1827. Puritanical American missionaries wanted the Catholics expelled until the French Navy arrived in 1839 and issued an ultimatum to tolerate the Catholics.

=== Jesuit missions ===
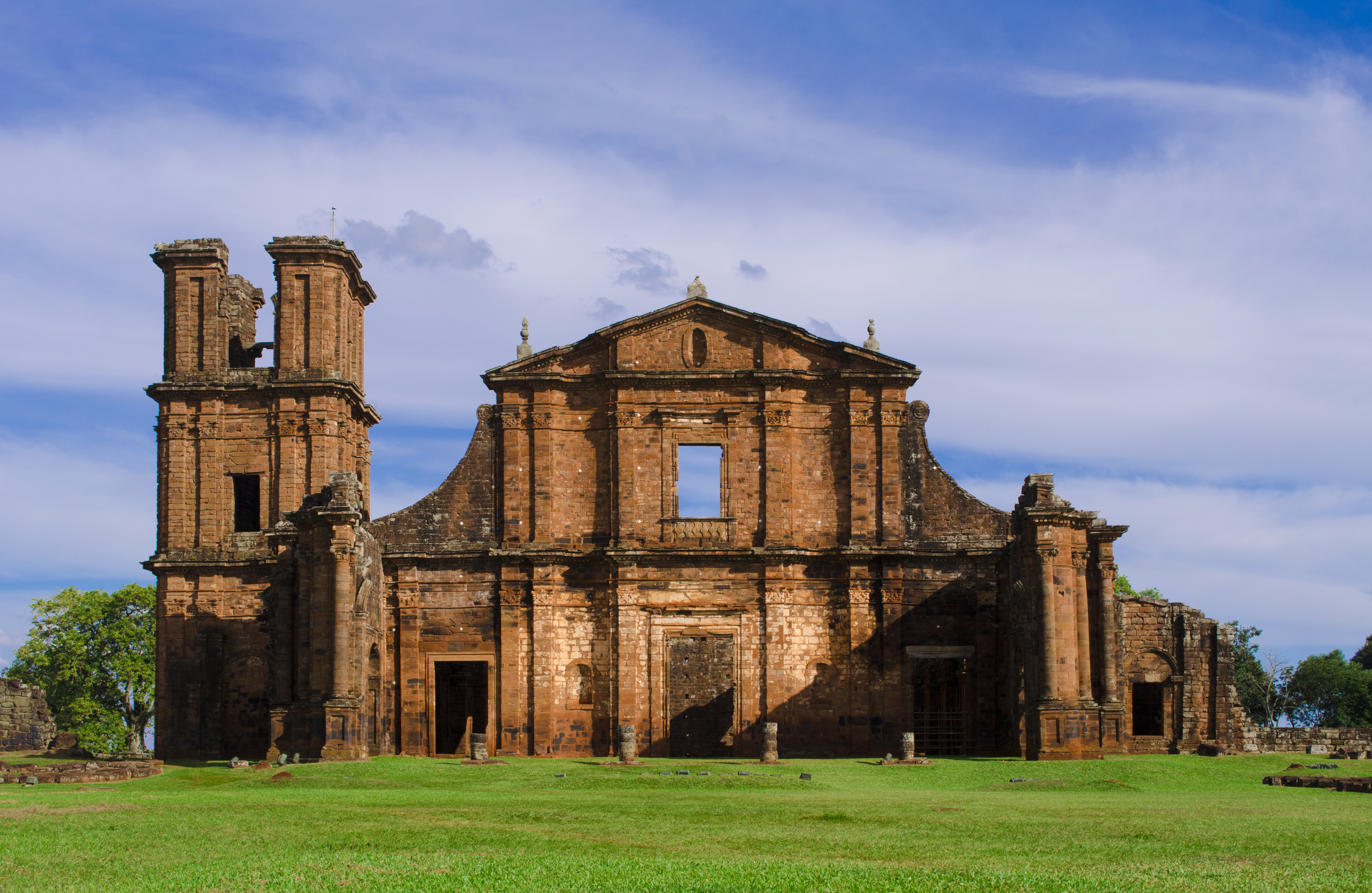
Ruins of the Spanish Jesuit mission of São Miguel das Missões in what is now Rio Grande do Sul in southern Brazil

Various missions and initiatives of the Jesuits predated, accompanied and followed western colonization across the world. In Lithuania, since 1579 the Jesuit-founded Vilnius University spearheaded Counterreformation, eradication of indigenous religion and language. At around the same time in China, Korea and Japan Jesuit missions predated western military incursions by a couple of centuries. The incursions were not only ideological but scientific – the Jesuits reformed the Chinese lunisolar calendar in 1645, a change described as "pathological". 17th-century India deserved a mission to study Brahmanical knowledge and Christianizing missions were dispatched to native North Americans. Jesuit missions were documented in biannual Jesuit Relations:

In "Harvest of Souls: The Jesuit Missions and Colonialism in North America, 1632–1650", Carole Blackburn uses the Jesuit Relations to shed light on the dialogue between Jesuit missionaries and the Native peoples of northeastern North America. In 1632 Jesuit missionary Paul Le Jeune, newly arrived at the Fort of Quebec, wrote the first of the Relations to his superior in Paris, initiating a series of biannual mission reports that came to be known as the "Jesuit Relations." In other writings, Jesuit missionaries in New France preaching to the Amerindians described the indigenous peoples as "savages" and tried to instill European standards of religion and civilization upon them. Jesuit missionaries attempted to culturally transform those people by creating confusion and disturbing their religious order and lifestyles.

Blackburn presents a contemporary interpretation of the 1632–1650 Relations, arguing that they are colonizing texts in which the Jesuits use language, imagery, and forms of knowledge to legitimize relations of inequality with the Huron and Montagnais. Blackburn shows that resulted in the displacement of much of the content of the message and demonstrates that the Native people's acts of resistance took up and transformed aspects of the Jesuits' teachings in ways that subverted their authority.

In 1721, Jesuit Ippolito Desideri tried to Christianize Tibetans but permission from the Order was not granted.

Jesuits themselves participated in economic colonization by founding and operating vast ranches in Peru, and Argentina which still exist. Jesuit reductions were socialist theocratic settlements for indigenous people specifically in the Rio Grande do Sul area of Brazil, Paraguay, and neighbouring Argentina in South America. They were established by the Jesuits early in the 17th century and wound up in the 18th century with the banning of the order in several European countries.

A large body of scientific work exists examining entanglements between Jesuit missions, western science emanating from Jesuit-founded universities, colonization and globalization. Since the global Jesuit network grew so large as to necessitate direct connections between branches without passing through Vatican, the order can be seen as one of the earliest examples of global organizations and globalization.

=== Canada ===
In 2021, there were claims of unmarked graves of indigenous children at Marieval Indian Residential School and Kamloops Indian Residential School, part of the Canadian Indian residential school system.

The majority (67 percent) of residential schools were run by the Catholic Church, with the remaining 33 percent including the Anglican, United, and Presbyterian Church.

== Japan ==
First Jesuit missionaries arrived in Kyushu in 1542 from Portugal and brought gunpowder with them. Francis Xavier arrived in 1550. Xavier was a pioneer in the Christian understanding of Japanese culture as he attempted to learn the Japanese language to build up fidelity in the new Japanese converts. The success of his evangelizing came from gathering individuals and families, rather than mass preaching. Those preachings led to baptisms and successful missions in Japan. Jesuit missionaries were supported Japan, rather than other destinations, because of the highly-civilized society of the Japanese people. Father Xavier admired the Japanese for their 'houses and palaces,' 'civilization,' and its 'luxuries.'

In the late 1580s, the Jesuit missionary and operative Gaspar Coelho attempted to create an axis of Christian converts among southern feudatory lords. who would support an armed Christian takeover of Japan. Arms were to be procured from Portuguese colonial outposts in South and Southeast Asia, however the plan was detected by the Toyotomi government and came to nothing.

In 1596, a Spanish Manila galleon became wrecked on the coast of Shikoku. Its pilot, upon being interviewed, insinuated to the Japanese authorities that it was the Spanish modus operandi to subvert native societies from within via mass Christian conversion prior to conquest. Toyotomi Hideyoshi, the chief advisor to the Japanese emperor, then started the first lethal suppression of Christianity.

In 1825, the military scholar Aizawa Seishisai published a series of essays to be presented to the Tokugawa government on, among other things, the threat to Japan's sovereignty posed by Christianity. He suggested that the European and American powers used Christianity as a cultural weapon by which native populations could be turned on their own governments to facilitate conquest and colonization. The text discussed directly the Toyotomi-era encounters with the Jesuits and warned that the countries of Asia, particularly Japan and China, had become geographically and politically isolated as the last surviving nations maintaining polities that were not based on Abrahamic religion.

== India ==
In 1924, Mahatma Gandhi criticised the conversion activities of Christian missionaries across the world, specially their role in exploitative colonisation, human genocide and cultural genocide:

This [Christian] proselytization will mean no peace in the world. Conversions are harmful to India. If I had the power and could legislate I should certainly stop all proselytizing ... It pains me to have to say that the Christian missionaries as a body, with honorable exceptions, have actively supported a system which has impoverished, enervated and demoralized a people considered to be among the gentlest and most civilized on earth.

The first converts to Christianity in Goa were native Goan women who married Portuguese men who arrived with Afonso de Albuquerque during the Portuguese conquest of Goa in 1510.

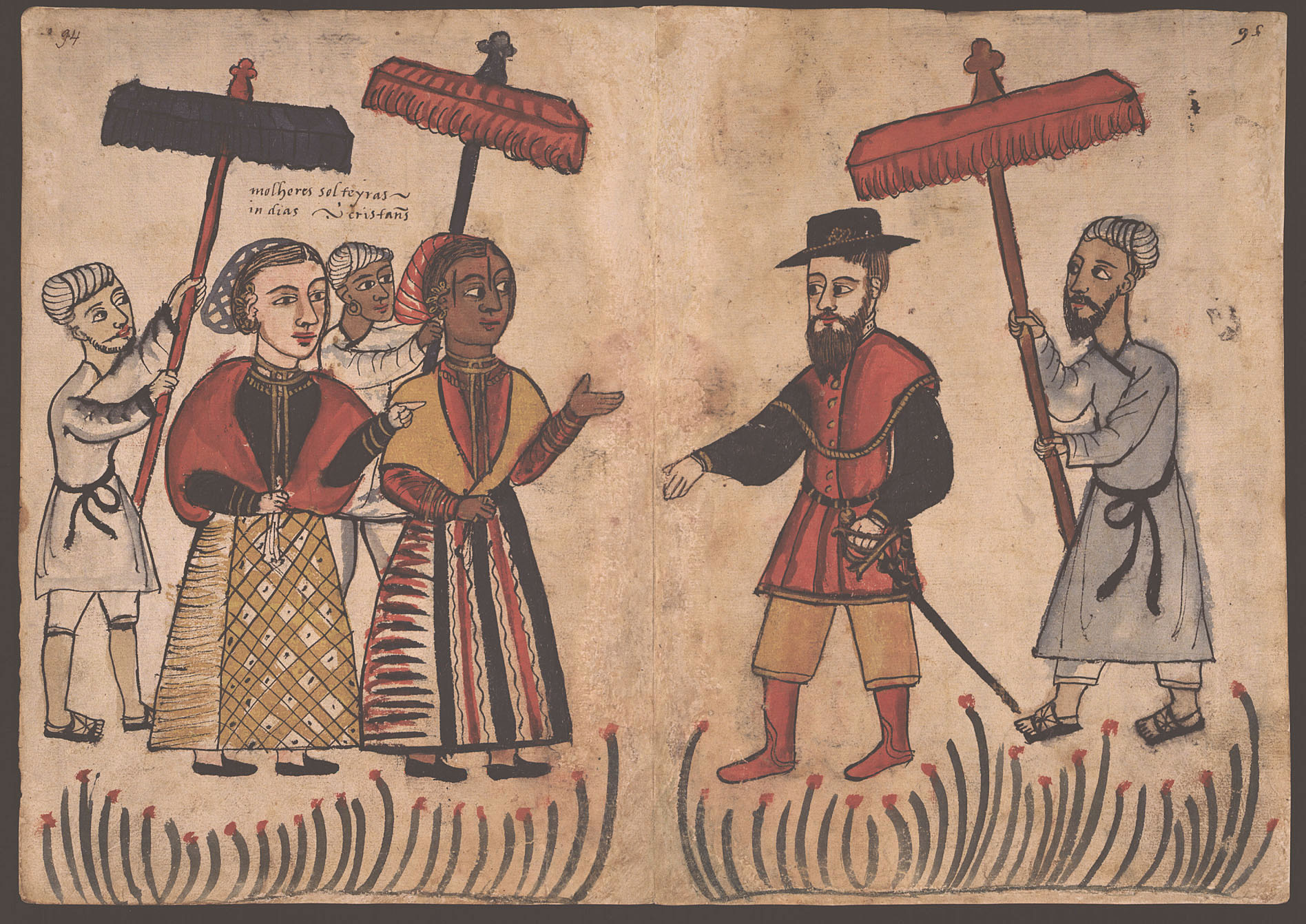
Christian maidens of Goa meeting a Portuguese nobleman seeking a wife, from the Códice Casanatense (c. 1540)

Missionaries of various religious orders (Franciscans, Dominicans, Jesuits, Augustinians, etc.) were sent from Portugal to Goa with the goal of fulfilling the papal bull Romanus Pontifex, which granted the patronage of the propagation of the Christian faith in Asia to the Portuguese. To promote assimilation of the native Goans with the Portuguese people, the Portuguese authorities in Goa supported those missionaries. The rapid rise of converts in Goa was mostly the result of Portuguese economic and political control over the Hindus, who were vassals of the Portuguese crown.

By the 1580s, the total population of Goa was about 60,000 with an estimated Hindu population then about a third or 20,000. The Goa Inquisition was an extension of the Portuguese Inquisition in Portuguese India. Its objective was to enforce Catholic orthodoxy and allegiance to the Apostolic See of Rome (Pontifex). The inquisition primarily focused on the New Christians accused of secretly practicing their former religions, and Old Christians accused of involvement in the Protestant Revolution of the 16th century. It was established in 1560, briefly suppressed from 1774 to 1778, continued thereafter until it was finally abolished in 1812.

Over 90% of Goans in the Velhas Conquistas became Catholic by the early 1700s. Xenddi was a discriminatory religious tax imposed on the Goan Hindu minority by the colonial era Portuguese Christian government in Goa, Daman and Diu in 1704. It was similar to the discriminatory Jizya religious tax, which was imposed on Hindus by Muslim rulers in the region.

In its initial formulation, the tax was introduced with the pretext that Hindus did not own any land in Goa, but only the Christians owned it. Land revenues were paid by the Goan Catholics in Goa, and the regional church argued that Xenddi tax would make Hindus pay their fair share. The tax and the tax rate on Hindus evolved to be an abusive form of religious discrimination.

According to Rene Berendse, the Xenddi tax was considered to be an example of religious intolerance by the neighboring Mahratta Confederacy, and its local leader Govind Das Pant made abolishment of the discriminatory tax against the Hindus as a condition for a mutual armistice agreement. The Goan government initially refused, stating that the Xenddi tax was a matter of the Church, which the Portuguese state cannot interfere in. Expanded to all of Portuguese colonies in the Indian subcontinent by 1705, the Xenddi was abolished in 1840, with J.J. Lopes de Lima, the Governor General of Goa, declaring it to be "cruel, hateful tribute and ridiculous capitation tax" on Hindus.

In India, the British missionaries were often in conflict with British administrators and businessmen. Missionaries had moderate success among the scheduled classes. In French-controlled Vietnam, and a Japanese-controlled Korea, the Christian missionaries had significant success in terms of membership.

Christianity had a more subtle effect and reached far beyond the converted population to potential modernizers. The introduction of European medicine was especially important, as well as the introduction of European political practices and ideals such as religious liberty, mass education, mass printing, newspapers, voluntary organizations, colonial reforms, and especially liberal democracy. However, more recent research finds no significant relationship between Protestant missions and the development of democracy.

== Africa ==
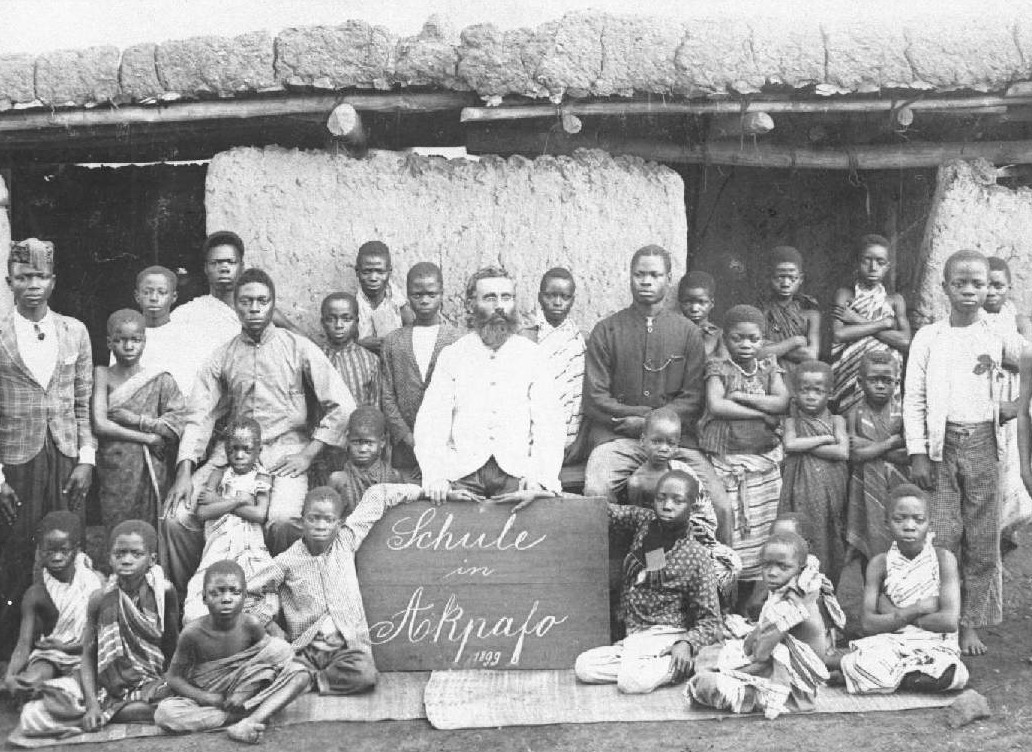
North German missionary school in Togo, 1899

Although there were some earlier small-scale efforts, the major missionary activities from Europe and North America came late in the 19th century, during the Scramble for Africa.

Christian evangelists were intimately involved in the colonial process in southern Africa. The missionaries discovered increasingly that the medical and educational services they could provide were highly welcome to Africans who were not responsive to theological appeals. When Christian missionaries came to Africa, some native peoples were very hostile and not accepting of the missionaries in Africa. During the Scramble for Africa, there was a realization that African regions had valuable resources from which Western culture could profit. Christianity was a disguise for Western colonization in those areas to take valuable resources from the native African land.

Despite the rush to Africa for its goods, in the book A History of Africa by J.D. Fage, he states, "Mid-and late-nineteenth-century Europeans were generally convinced that their Christian, scientific and industrial society was intrinsically far superior to anything that Africa had produced." The exploitation of natural resources can contribute to the hostility of African natives towards European colonizers. Even though some Christian missionaries went about colonizing the native Africans in unchristian ways, not showing qualities expected of a Christian, there were some missionaries who were truly devoted to colonizing through peaceful means and truly thought that the people of Africa needed to be taught that Jesus was their Savior...

David Livingstone (1813–1873), a Scottish missionary, became world-famous in the Anglophone world. He worked after 1840 north of the Orange River with the London Missionary Society, as an explorer, missionary and writer. He became one of the most popular British heroes of the late 19th-century Victorian era. He had a mythical status that operated on a number of interconnected levels: Protestant missionary martyr, inspirational story of rising from the poor, scientific investigator and explorer, imperial reformer, and an anti-slavery crusader.

In the late 19th century, Mwanga II, kabaka of the Kingdom of Buganda, was in conflict with Christian missionaries out of fears of cultural and political subversion with an eye to the ultimate conquest of Buganda by the British. In 1886, he began a campaign of violent suppression of Christianity. The British quickly moved to dethrone him and supported an armed uprising by Christian converts and local Muslims. He was swiftly defeated by a force under his half-brother, a Christian convert, at Mengo hill in 1888. After a period of political unrest, Mwanga agreed to surrender his temporal powers to the Imperial British East Africa Company in exchange for being nominally allowed to return to the throne. Thereafter, the kingdom became essentially a British protectorate and was politically defunct. Mwanga himself ultimately died a Christian.

French Catholic missionaries worked in the extensive colonial holdings in Africa. However, in independent Ethiopia (Abyssinia), four French Franciscan sisters arrived in 1897, summoned there by the Capuchin missionaries. By 1925, they were very well-established, running an orphanage, a dispensary, a leper colony and 10 schools with 350 girl students. The schools were highly attractive to upper-class Ethiopians.

In French West Africa in the 1930s, a serious debate emerged between the French missionaries on the one side, and the upper-class local leadership that had been attending French schools in preparation for eventual leadership. Many of them had become Marxists, and French officials worried that they were creating their own Frankenstein monster. The French shifted priorities to set up rural schools for the poor lower classes, and an effort to support indigenous African culture and produce reliable collaborators with the French regime, instead of far-left revolutionaries seeking to overthrow it. The French plan to work through local traditional chiefs. For the same reason they also set up Koranic schools and Muslim areas. The traditional chiefs would be paid larger salaries and have charge of tax collection, local courts, military recruiting, and obtaining forced labor for public works projects. The government's program seemed a threat to the ambitions of the Marxist locals and they wanted them closed. The Marxist incited labor strikes, and encouraged immigration to British territories. When the far-right Petain government came to power in Vichy, France in 1940, a high priority was to remove the educated Marxist elite from any positions of authority in French West Africa.

=== Long-term impact ===
Walter Rodney a Guyanese, Pan-Africanist and Marxist historian based at the University of Dar es Salaam in Tanzania developed an influential attack on Europe in How Europe Underdeveloped Africa (1972). He mentioned the missionaries:

The Christian missionaries were much part of the colonizing forces as were the explorers, traders and soldiers. There may be room for arguing whether in a given colony the missionaries brought other colonialist forces or vice versa, but there is no doubting the fact that missionaries were agents of colonialism in the practical sense whether or not they saw themselves in that light.

According to Heather Sharkey, the real impact of the activities of the missionaries is still a topic open to debate in academia today. Sharkey asserted that "the missionaries played manifold roles in colonial Africa and stimulated forms of cultural, political and religious change." Historians still debate the nature of their impact and question their relation to the system of European colonialism in the continent. Sharkey noted that the missionaries provided crucial social services such as modern education and health care that would have otherwise not been available. Sharkey said that, in societies that were traditionally male-dominated, female missionaries provided women in Africa with health care knowledge and basic education. Conversely, it has been argued that Christianity played a central role in colonial efforts, allowing Christian missionaries to "colonize the conscience and consciousness" of Africans, thus instilling the belief that any non-Christian spiritual ideas are inferior to Christianity, echoing the colonial hierarchical view of culture.

A Pew Center study about religion and education around the world in 2016, found that "there is a large and pervasive gap in educational attainment between Muslims and Christians in sub-Saharan Africa" as Muslim adults in the region are far less educated than their Christian counterparts, with scholars suggesting that the gap is because of the educational facilities that were created by Christian missionaries during the colonial era for fellow believers.

A major contribution of the Christian missionaries in Africa was better health care of the people through hygiene and introducing and distributing the soap.

== Current Christian perspectives ==
Pope Francis, a Jesuit, frequently criticised the colonialism and neocolonialism of the Christian nations of the Global North, referring to colonialism as "blasphemy against God" and saying that "many grave sins were committed against the Native peoples of America in the name of God." Speaking with hindsight and on the basis of current theology, Francis said, "No actual or established power has the right to deprive peoples of the full exercise of their sovereignty." He also spoke of "the new colonialism [which] takes on different faces. At times it appears as the anonymous influence of mammon: corporations, loan agencies, certain 'free trade' treaties, and the imposition of measures of 'austerity' which always tighten the belt of workers and the poor."

== See also ==
- Anti-Christian sentiment
- British Indian Department
- Christianity and other religions
- Christianity and violence
- Christianization
- Christian views on slavery
- Civilizing mission
- Criticism of Christianity
- History of Christian thought on persecution and tolerance
- Inculturation
- Role of Christianity in Western society
- Valladolid debate
