= Ponytail =

Hairstyle gathering hair at the back of the head

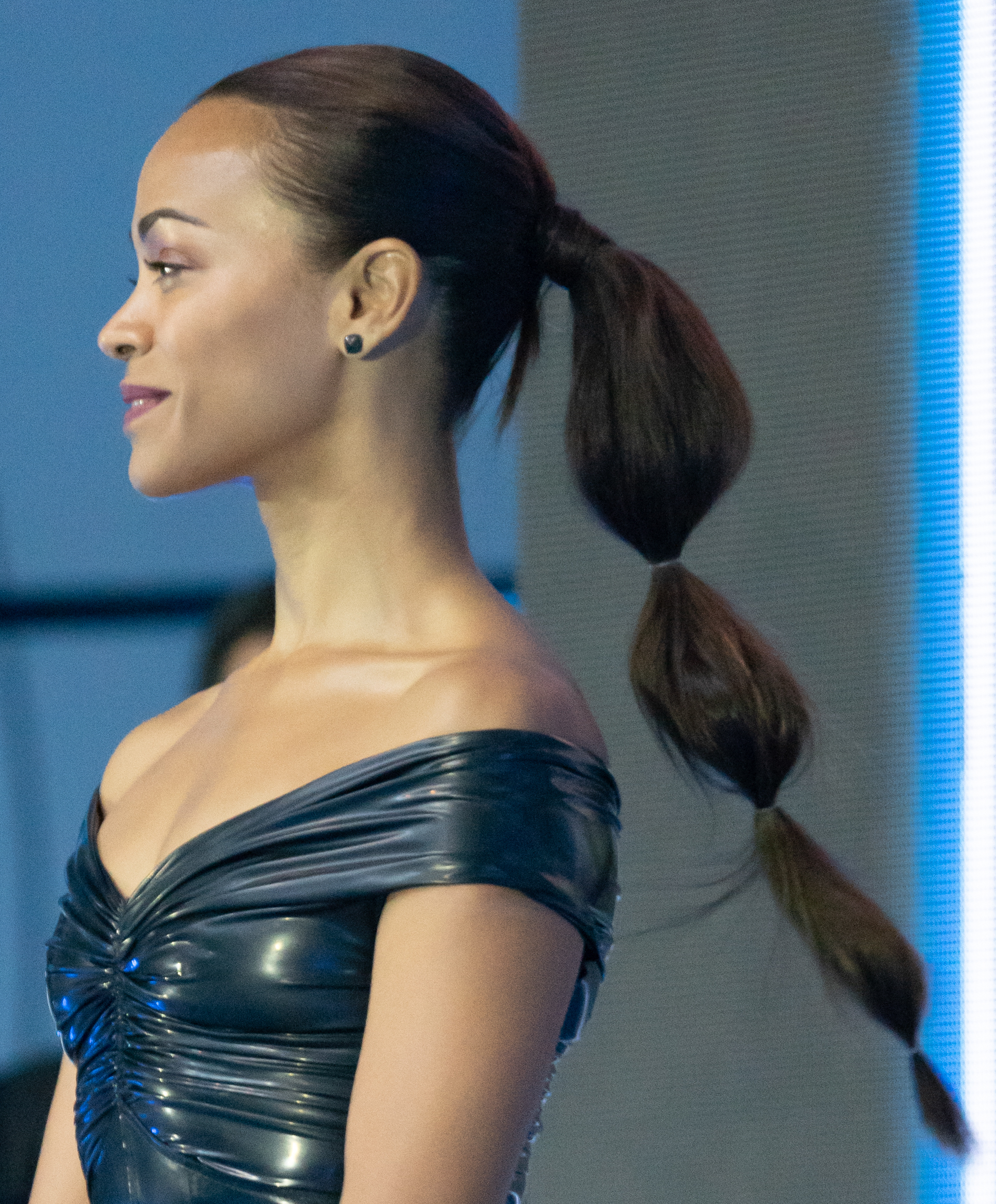
A woman's ponytail

A ponytail is a hairstyle in which some, most, or all of the hair on the head is pulled away from the face, gathered, and secured at the back of the head with a hair tie, clip, or other similar accessory and allowed to hang freely from that point. The style gets its name from its resemblance to the tail of a pony.

Ponytails are most commonly gathered at the middle of the back of the head or the base of the neck, but may also be worn at the side of the head (sometimes considered formal), or on the very top of the head. Styles where the hair is divided so that it hangs in two sections are called ponytails, twintails, pigtails, or bunches if left loose and pigtails, plaits or braid if plaited. A half ponytail (or half pony) involves only a part of the hair gathered into a bunch.

== Ponytails on women and girls ==
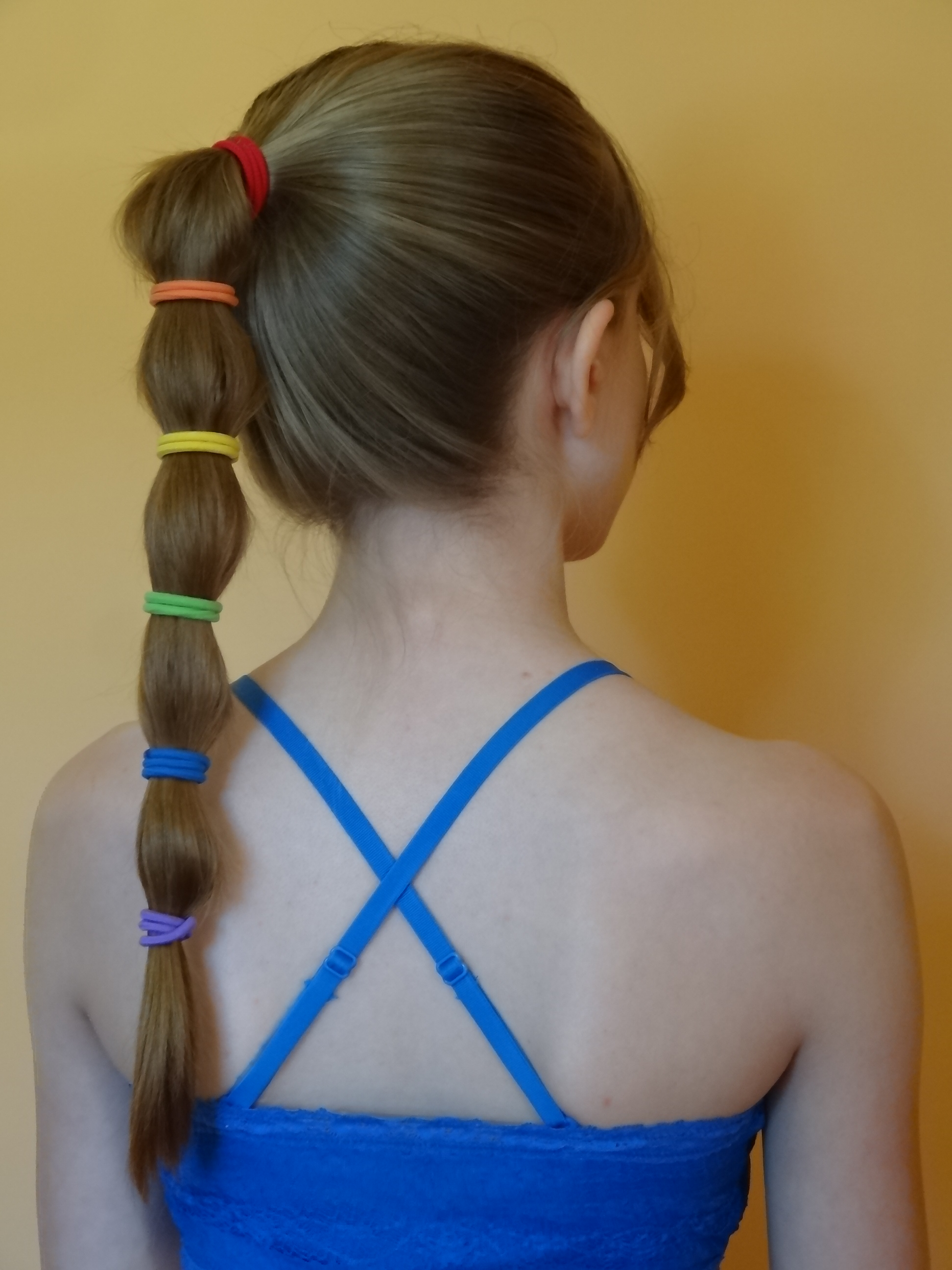
A tied ponytail

The ponytail can be traced back to Ancient Greece, from records of images depicting women with ponytails in ancient Greek artefacts and artworks, such as the frescoes painted millennia ago in Cretes (2000–1500 BC). Hence, it is likely that the ponytail hairstyle emerged in Ancient Greece before spreading to different cultures and regions, for Egyptian and Roman art also depict women wearing hair in a style that we now call the ponytail.

In European and Western culture, it was unusual for women (as opposed to girls) to wear their hair in public in a ponytail until the mid-20th century. The ponytail hairstyle was popularized by the arrival of the Barbie doll by Mattel, and movie stars like Sandra Dee who wore it in movies such as Gidget.

In the mid-1980s and through the mid-1990s it was common to see women of all ages from girls, tweens, teens, college and beyond wearing high ponytails or high side ponytails held with a scrunchie.

Both women and girls commonly wear their hair in ponytails in informal and office settings or when exercising with a scrunchie or tie; they are likely to choose more elaborate styles (such as braids and those involving accessories) for formal occasions. High and low ponytails are both common. Ponytails with a scrunchie are back in style and practicality as they are seen as better on the hair then traditional hair ties. The ponytail is popular with school-aged girls, partly because flowing hair is often associated with youth and because of its simplicity; a young girl is likely to be able to redo her own hair after a sports class, for example. Wearing a scrunchie with a ponytail is popular with school aged girls especially those with school uniforms as it is one piece of stylish item girls can wear as long as they conform to school colors or requirements. A ponytail can also be a fashion statement; sometimes meaning athletic; other times a low ponytail sends signals of a chic personality.

A ponytail is a practical choice as it keeps hair out of the face when on a day-to-day basis. It is not uncommon to require long hair to be tied up for safety reasons in an environment like wood shops, laboratories, sporting activities, hospitals etc., even where hair nets are not mandatory. The ponytail, particularly a low ponytail, is often the most practical way to secure the hair.

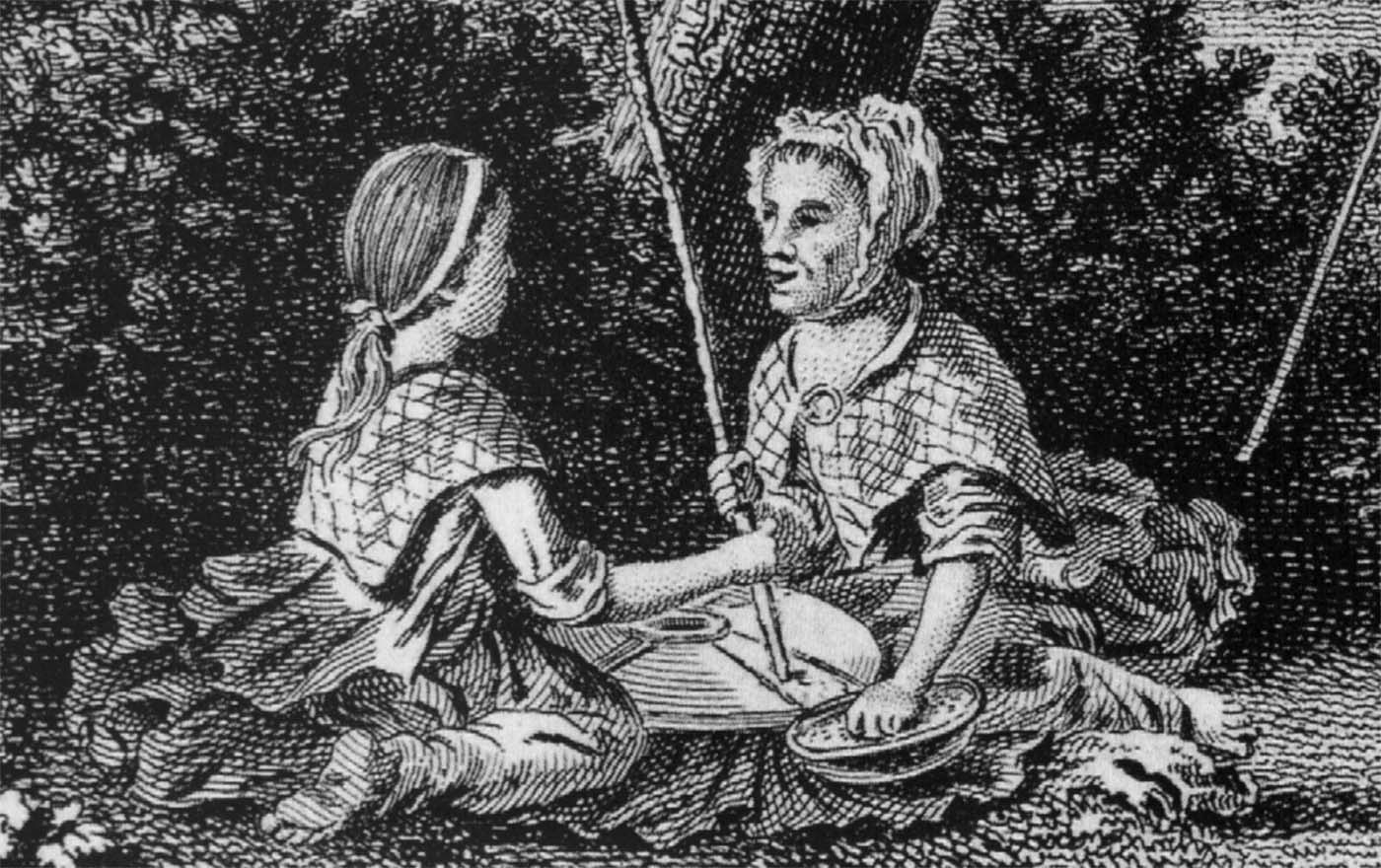
Detail from an 18th-century engraving showing a girl (left) with a low ponytail

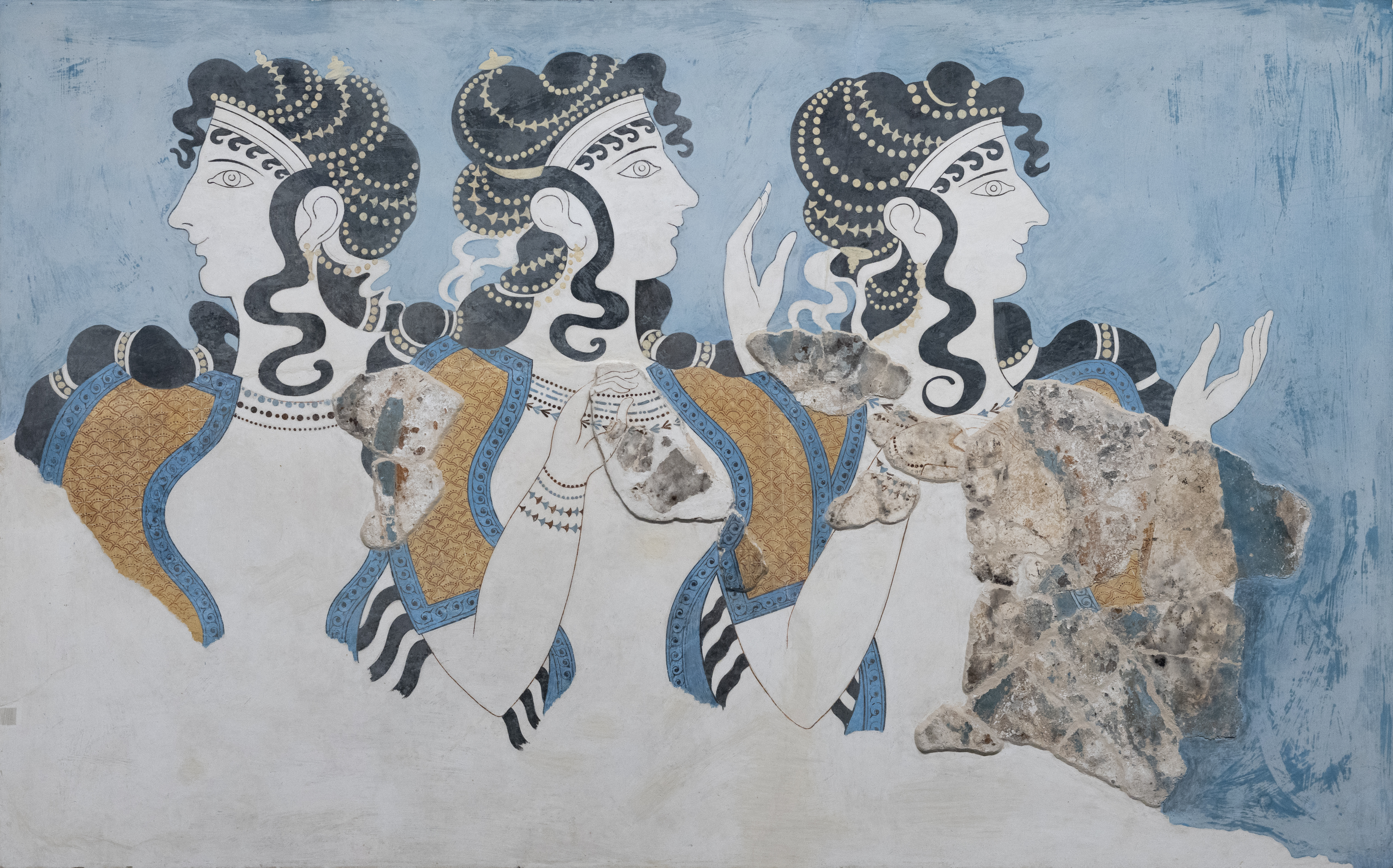
Image of the fresco, "Ladies in Blue", from the Palace of Knossos on the island of Crete, with women wearing what seems like a ponytail hairstyle.

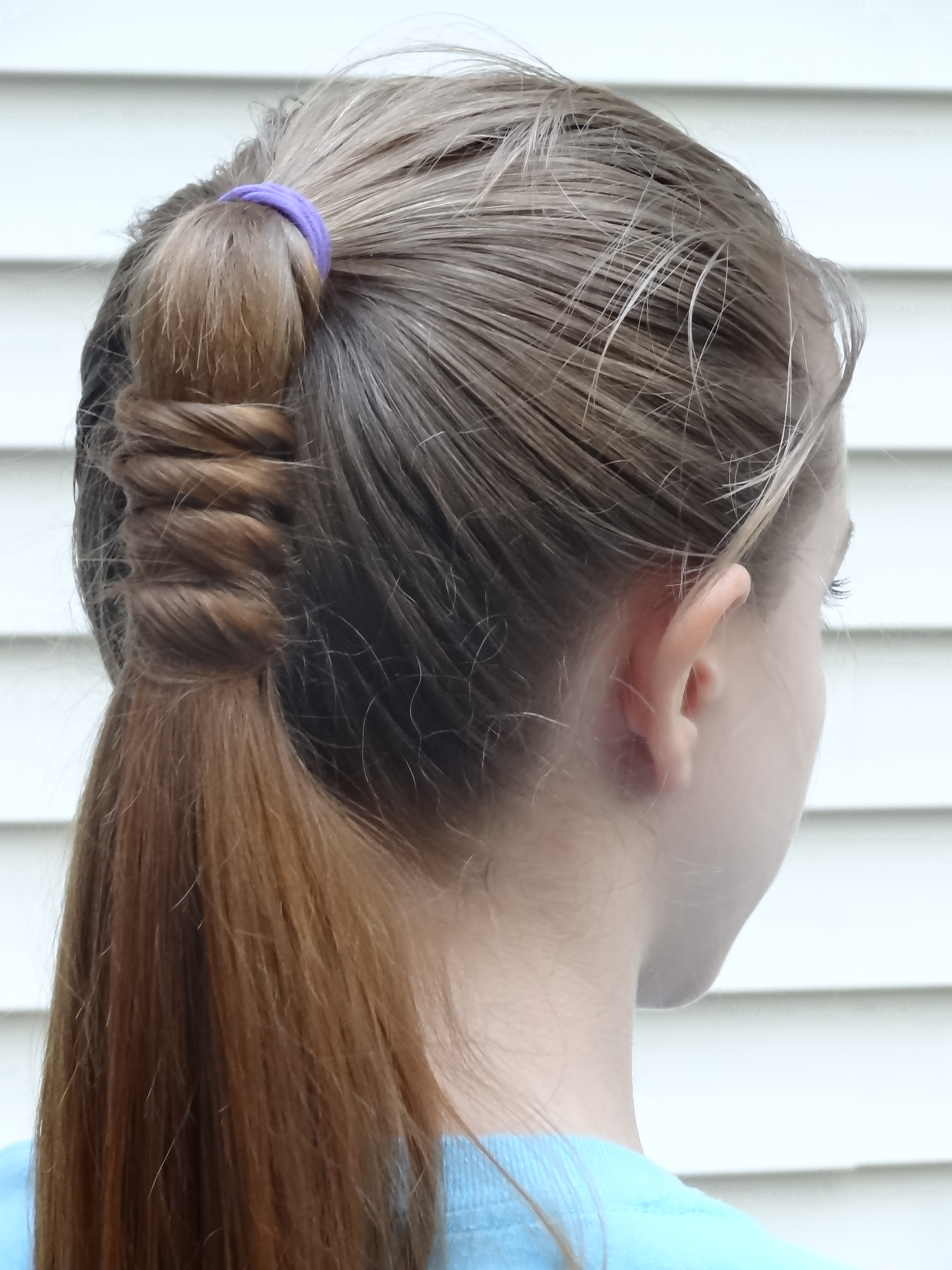
Knotted ponytail

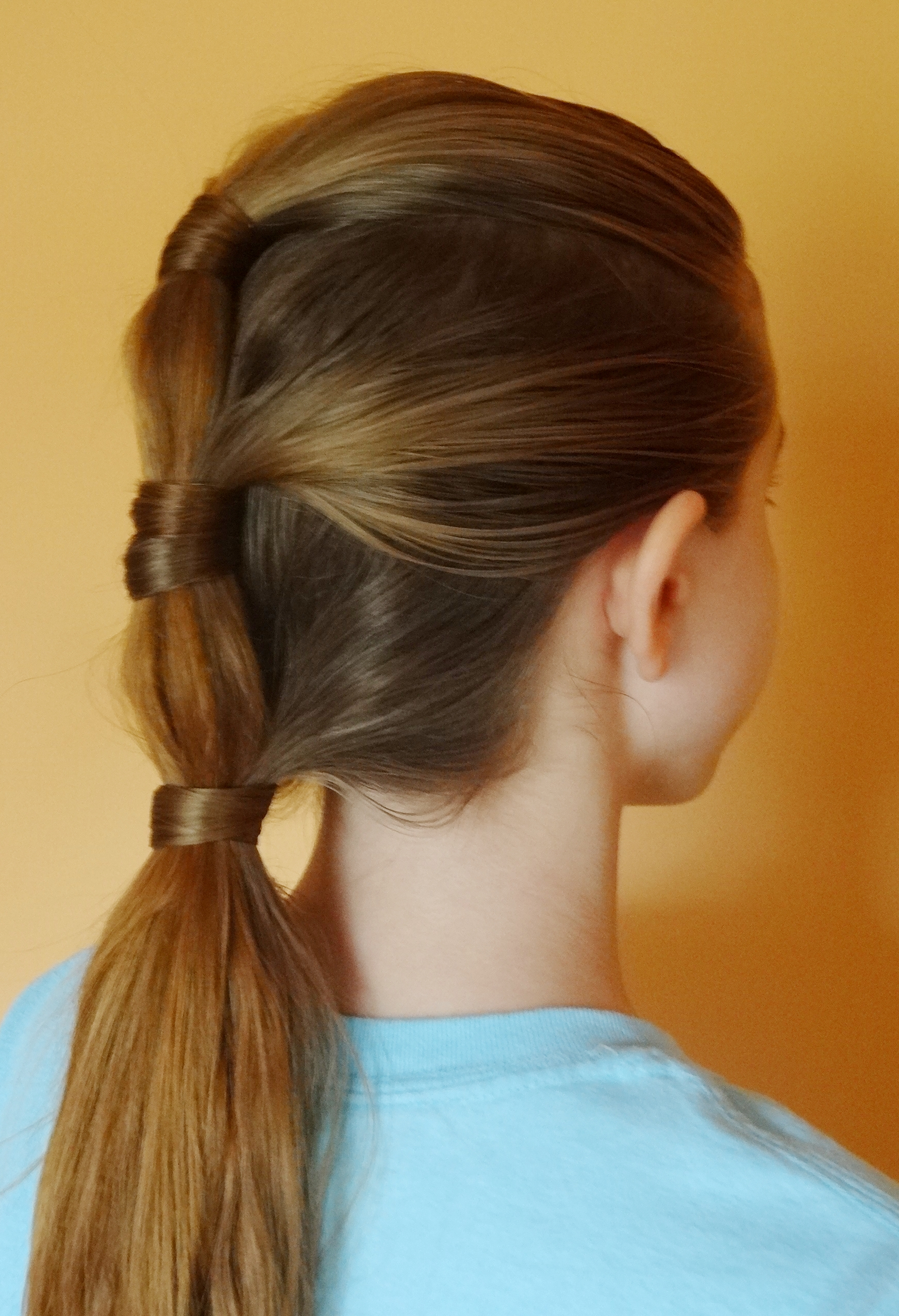
Sectioned ponytail

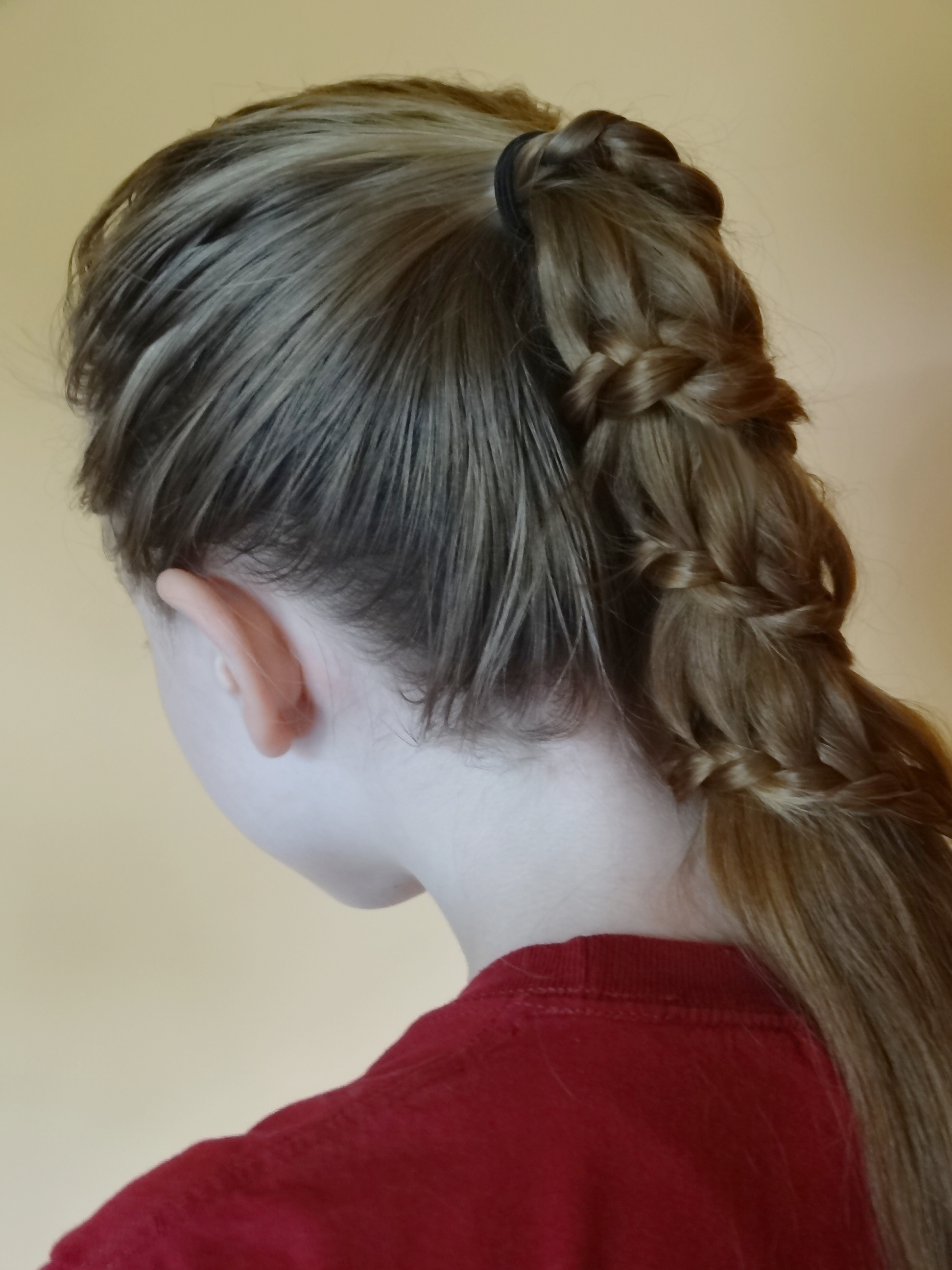
Winding lace braid ponytail

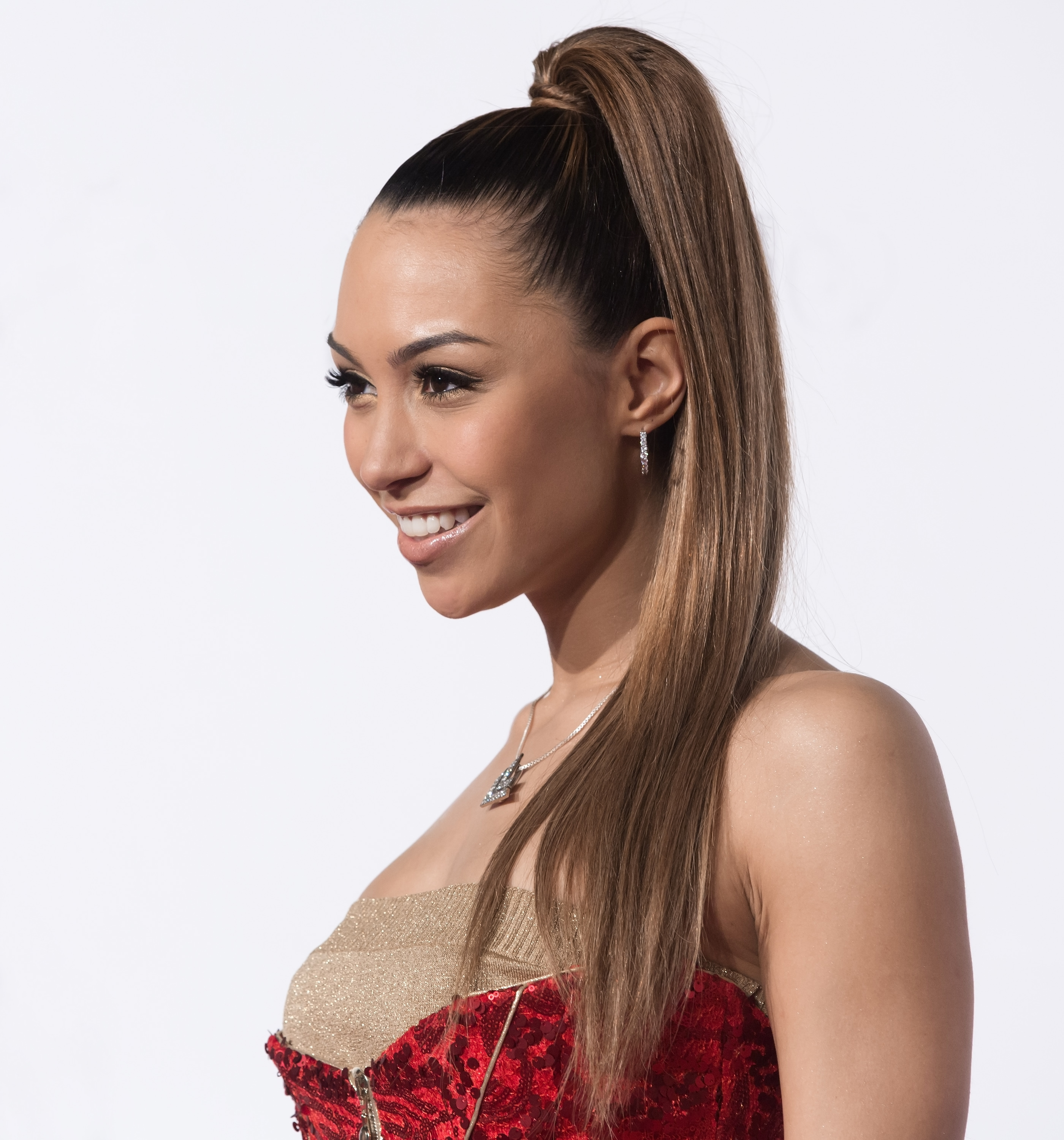
High ponytail

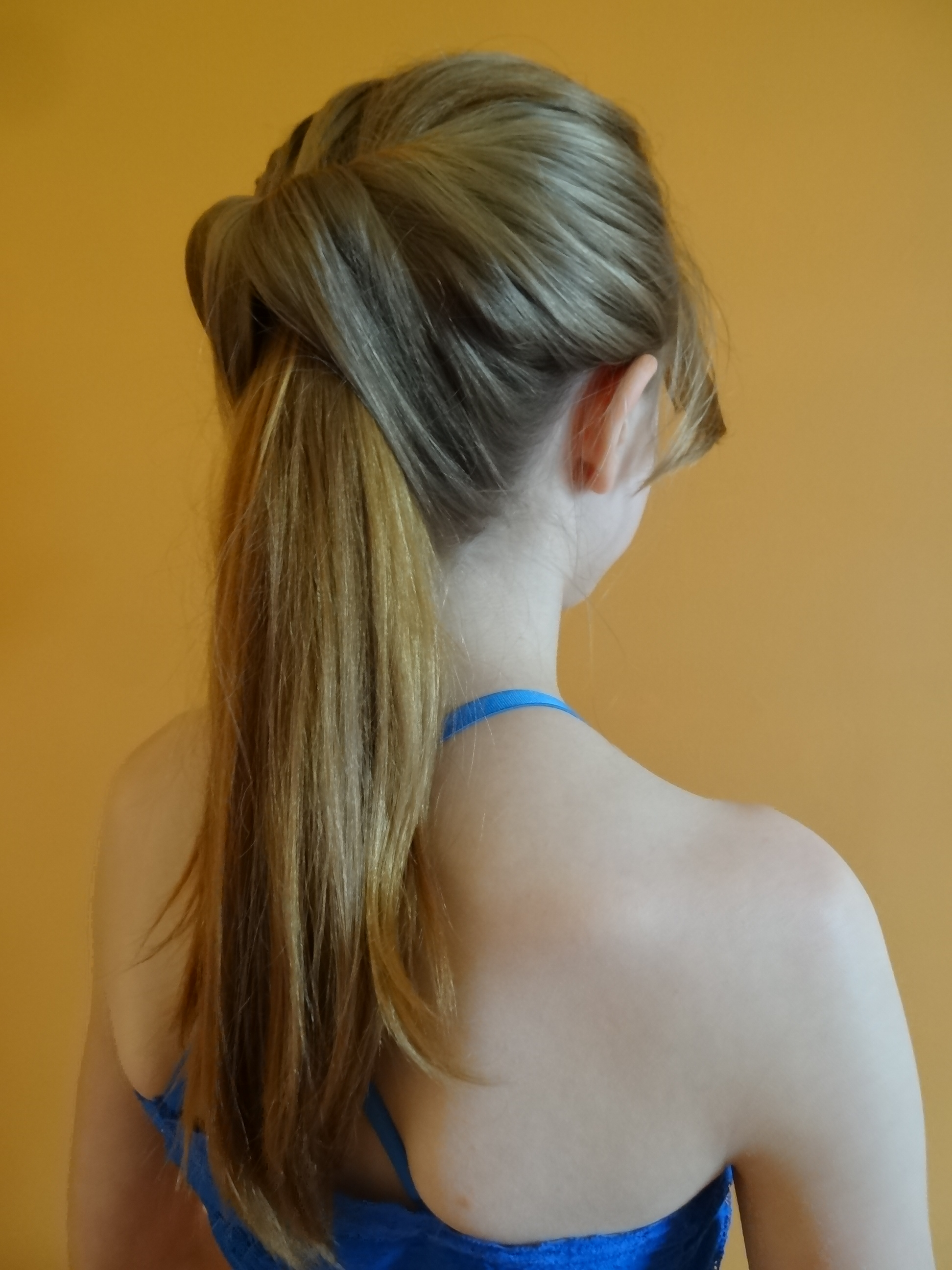
Flip ponytail

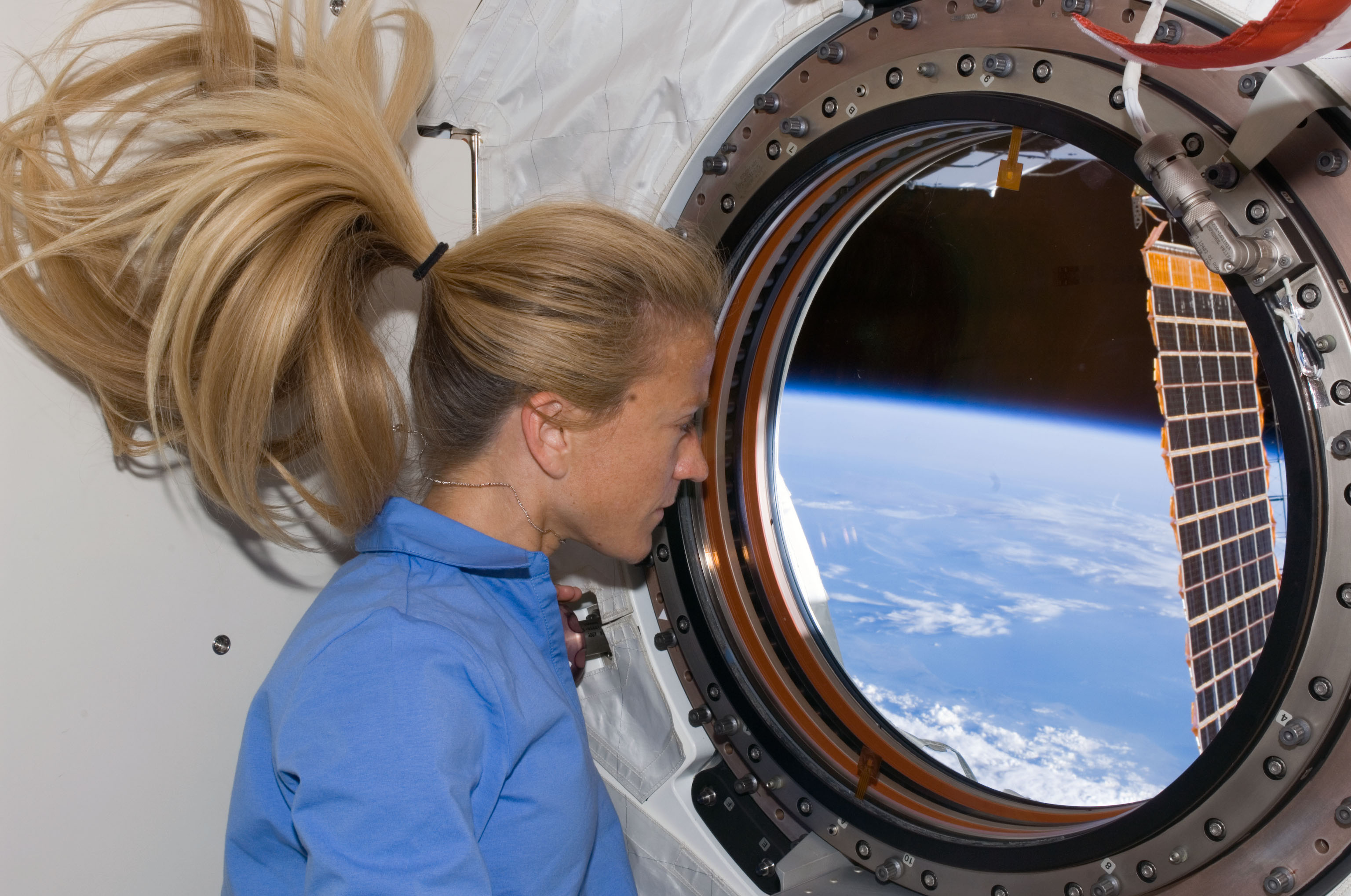
Ponytail in microgravity on the International Space Station

== As a male hairstyle ==
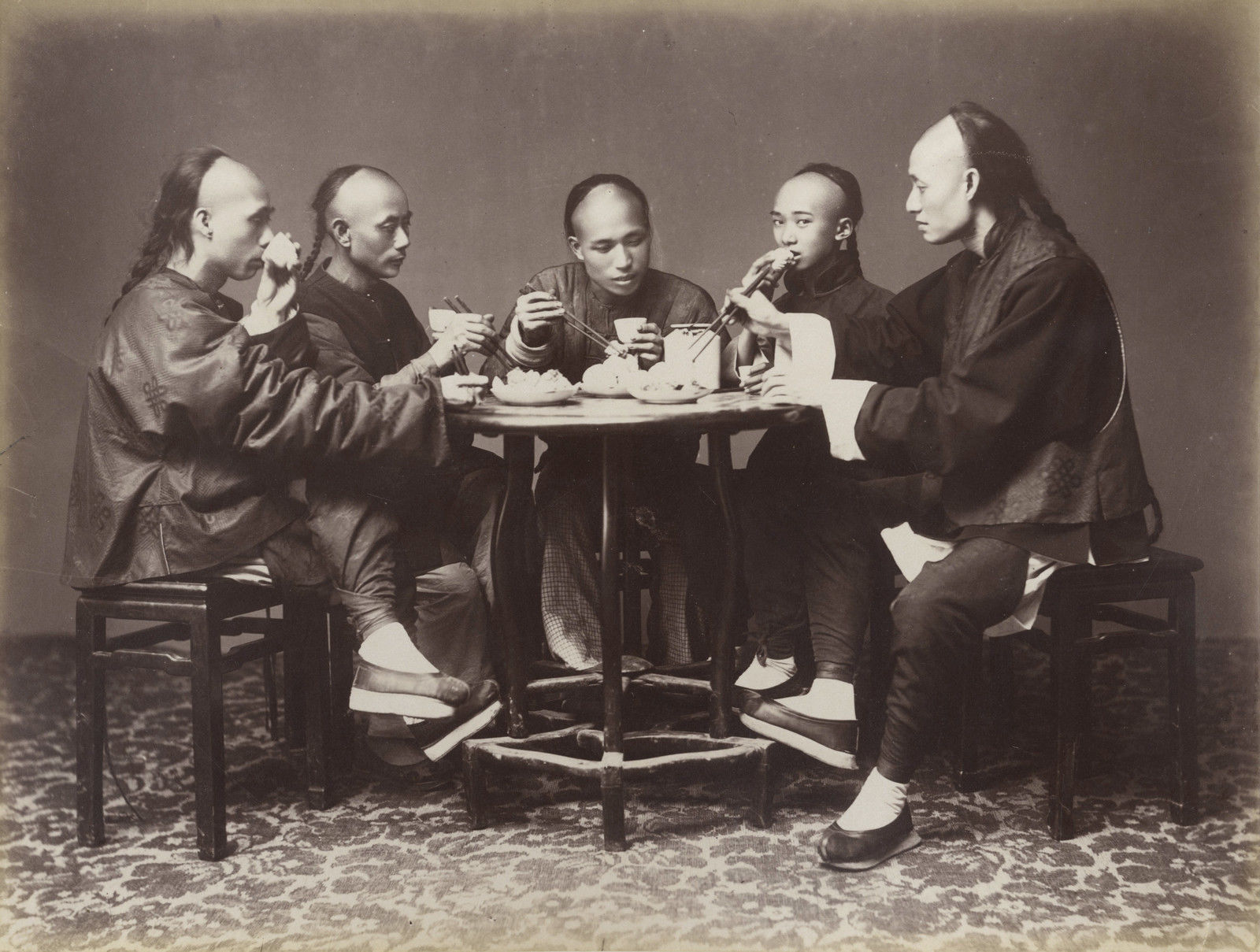
Late 19th century Chinese men wearing ponytails (queues)

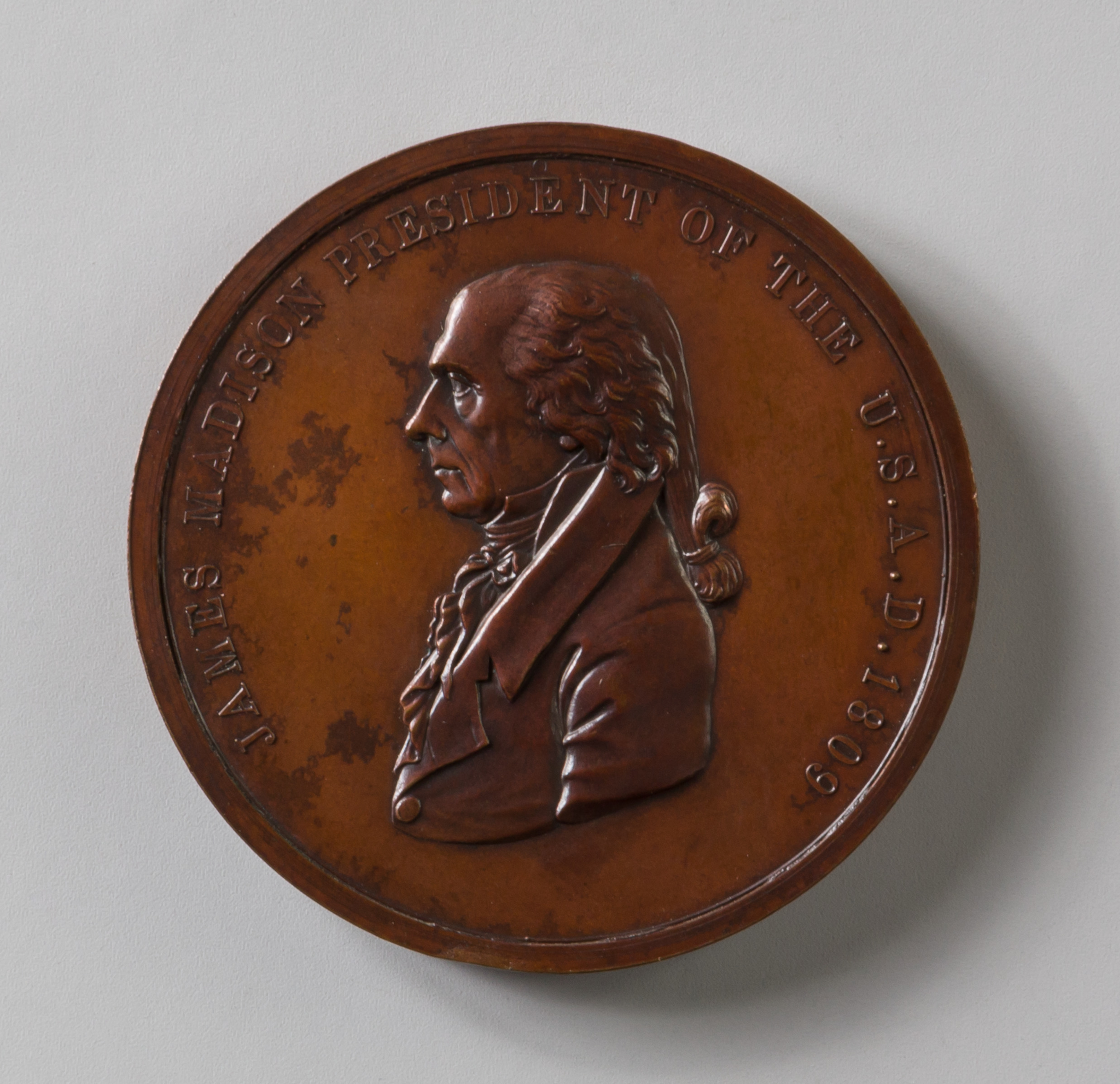
Early 19th century American President James Madison wearing a ponytail

=== Historical ===
In Europe, in the second half of the 18th century (1751-1800), most men wore their hair long and tied back with a ribbon into what would now be described as a ponytail, although it was sometimes gathered into a silk bag rather than allowed to hang freely. At that time, it was commonly known as queue, the French word for "tail". The queue lost favor amongst civilians, but continued as the mandatory hairstyle for men in all European armies until the early 19th century. The British Army was the first to dispense with it, and by the end of the Napoleonic Wars most armies had changed their regulations to make short hair compulsory.

In Asia, the queue was a specifically male hairstyle worn by the Manchu people from central Manchuria and later imposed on the Han Chinese during the Qing dynasty. From 1645 until 1910, Chinese men wore this waist-length pigtail. The queue was utilised as a symbol of dominance over the Han Chinese by the Manchu people. Being a Manchu hairstyle, it was imposed on the Han Chinese to force them into submission. The queue hairstyle involves shaving the rest of the hair on the front and sides of the head, leaving a meagre portion that is tightly tied into a braid. With this hairstyle, the Han Chinese could not grow their hair naturally and freely to style them as they normally did in their own culture, and were hence denied their cultural right to grow their hair comfortably, experiencing suppression and limited agency in the rule of the Qing. Any Han Chinese man who did not wear the queue was executed by beheading. This rule of law was upheld with the exception of monks, who attended monasteries and shaved their entire heads. For this reason alone, many Han Chinese left their homes for monasteries to protect their freedom from this symbol of domination. Otherwise, those who opposed the queue were perceived as threats to Qing culture and power and were purged. Many of the officials who contributed to the enforcement of this law were Han Chinese who defected to the Qing.

The queue ended in 1910 after revolutions against the law through queue-cutting demonstrations, law revisions to make it more lax, and further queue-cutting demonstrations by Chinese influenced by Western democracy, all of which pressured reform of China's law. Not long after, the Qing dynasty ended in 1911 or 1912.

Apart from origins in China, men in the Edo period (1683–1868) of Japan also wore short ponytails. Sumo wrestlers of Japan also wore their hair in a ponytail that is then styled in a fan shape. This hairstyle involving the chonmage continues in the culture of sumo wrestlers today.

=== Recent history ===
In the late 1980s, a short ponytail was seen as an impudent, edgy look for men who wanted to individualize, but keep their hair flat and functional (see mullet). Steven Seagal's ponytail in Marked for Death is an example. (Also see Man bun).

== Scientific studies ==
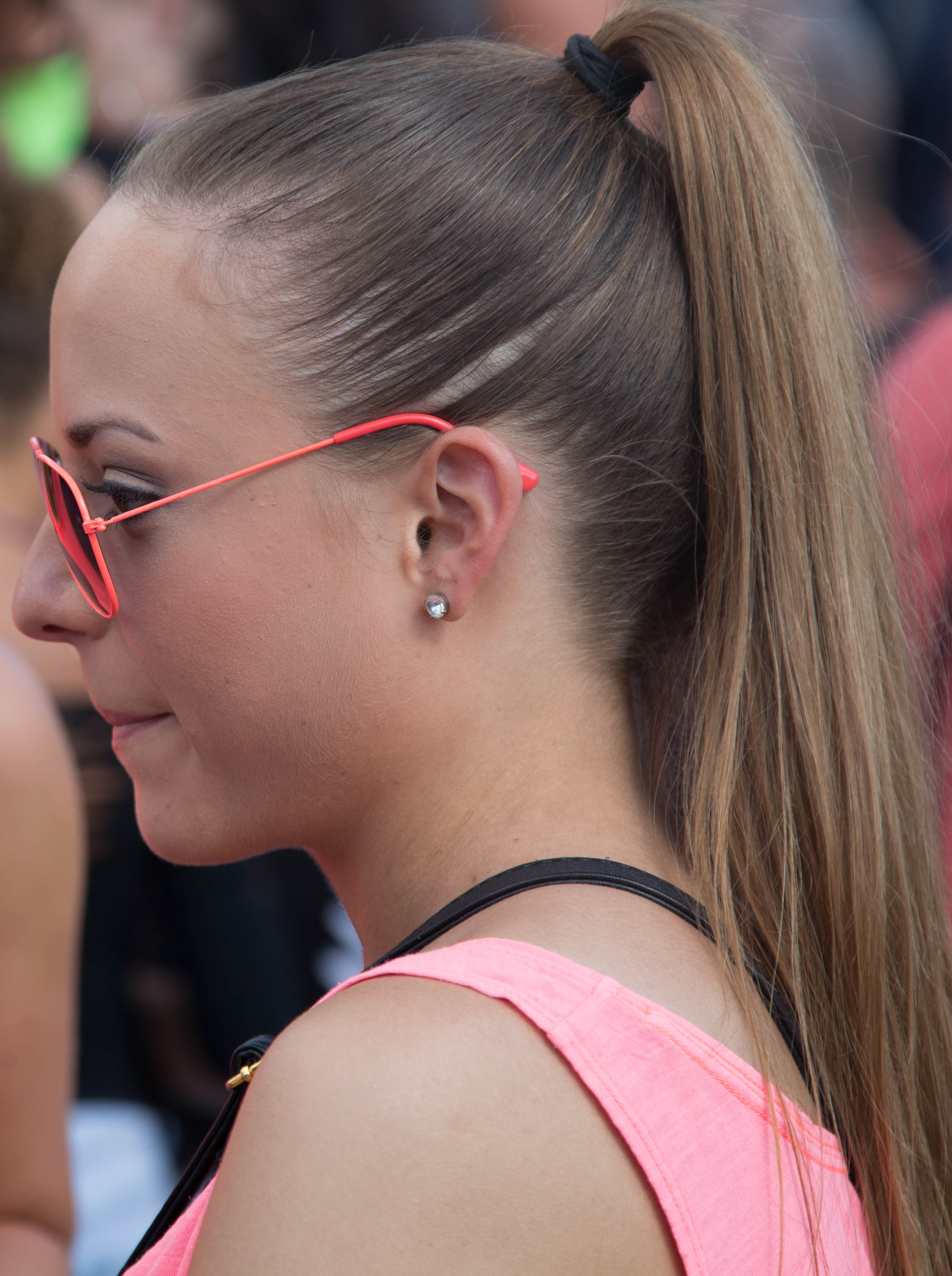
A woman's ponytail

The first equation of state for hair was developed by C. F. van Wyk in 1946.

Scientists in the UK have formulated a mathematical model that predicts the shape of a ponytail given the length and random curvature (or curliness) of a sample of individual hairs. The Ponytail Shape Equation provides an understanding of how a ponytail is swelled by the outward pressure which arises from interactions between the component hairs.

The researchers developed a general continuum theory for a bundle of hairs, treating each hair as an elastic filament with random intrinsic curvature. From this they created a differential equation for the shape of the bundle relating the elasticity, gravity, and orientational disorder and extracted a simple equation of state to relate the swelling pressure to the measured random curvatures of individual hairs. The equation itself is a fourth order non linear differential equation.

The Rapunzel number is a ratio used in this equation to calculate the effects of gravity on hair relative to its length.

Ra ≡ L/l

This number determines whether a ponytail looks like a fan or whether it arcs over and becomes nearly vertical at the bottom. A short ponytail of springy hair with a low Rapunzel number, fans outward. A long ponytail with a high Rapunzel number, hangs down, as the pull of gravity overwhelms the springiness.

It is now also known why jogger's ponytails swing side to side. An up and down motion is too unstable: a ponytail cannot sway forward and backward because the jogger's head is in the way. Any slight jostling causes the up and down movement to become a side to side sway.

The research on the shape of the ponytail won the authors the Ig Nobel for Physics in 2012.

The Rapunzel number is important for the computer graphics and animation industry, as it helps animators resolve challenges relating to the realistic digital representation of hair and hair movement.

== Health issues ==
It is common for those who wear tight ponytails to experience traction alopecia, a form of hair loss. It has been proven that traction alopecia is highly associated with hair-pulling hairstyles, including the ponytail, and that hairstyles involving less tension are not associated with this condition. Sometimes it can cause a headache.

Additionally, people who wear ponytails may experience extracranial headaches due to tension from prolonged tying of the hairs together in a bundle, pulling at the skin of the head. The pain that results is also because the ponytail pulls at the nerves in the scalp around the face, resulting in light to serious headaches or migraines.

Loosening the ponytail may relieve pain and the headache, though the extent of this varies for different individuals.

== See also ==
- List of hairstyles
- French braid
