= Rommy Hunt Revson =

American nightclub singer and inventor (1944–2022)

- Born: Rommy Kolb; February 15, 1944; White Plains, New York, U.S.
- Died: September 7, 2022 (aged 78); Rochester, Minnesota, U.S.
- Occupations: Nightclub singer, vocal coach, inventor
- Known for: Inventing the scrunchie
- Spouse(s): Four times divorced, including from John Revson
- Children: 1

Rommy Hunt Revson (née Kolb; February 15, 1944 – September 7, 2022) was an American nightclub singer and creator of the scrunchie.

== Early years ==
Revson was born in 1944 in White Plains, New York. She worked in the 1970s and 1980s as a singer in Manhattan nightclubs. She was also a voice teacher and songwriter. While working as a singer, she met Revlon cosmetics heir John Revson. After a six-year courtship, they were married for a year.

== The scrunchie ==
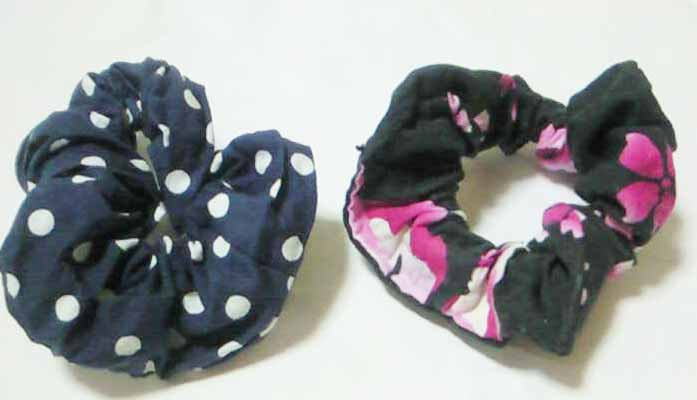
Scrunchies

In 1986, Revson invented the scrunchie, a hair accessory used to hold the hair in a pony tail. Revson invented the scrunchie while preparing for job interviews and trying to protect her brittle hair after having it bleached. She created the scrunchie out of soft fabric to avoid damaging her hair with elastic bands or plastic clips. She received a design patent for the invention. The invention, originally known as the "Scunci", was named after Revson's pet poodle. It later became known generically as the scrunchie.

Revson began a business to market her Scuncis and had $20 million in orders in the initial months. Unable to keep up with demand, Revson's business failed. She thereafter licensed her patent for manufacture by others. By the time her patent expired in 2001, more than two billion Scrunchies had been sold. Revson made $1 million a year in royalties from the scrunchie for more than 12 years.

== Personal life and death ==
Revson was married and divorced four times and had one son. At the time of her death, she was a resident of Wellington, Florida.

On September 7, 2022, Revson died in Rochester, Minnesota, at age 78, from a rupture in the ascending aorta. She died at a hotel room near the Mayo Clinic, where she was undergoing medical treatment for Cushing's disease and Ehlers–Danlos syndrome.
