= Hair tie =

Fashion item used to hold hair in place

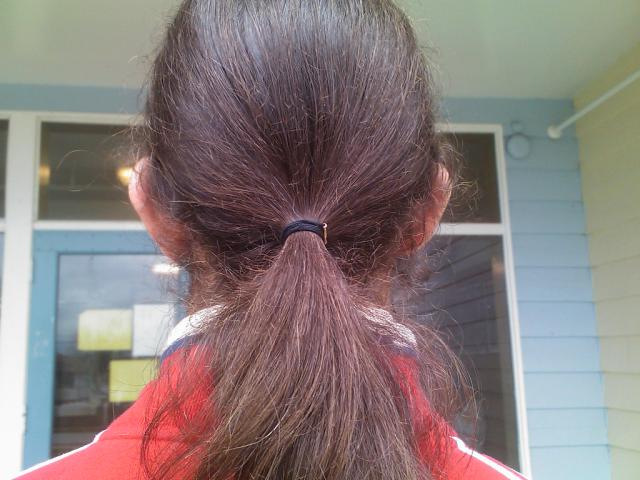
Ponytail affixed with a black hair tie

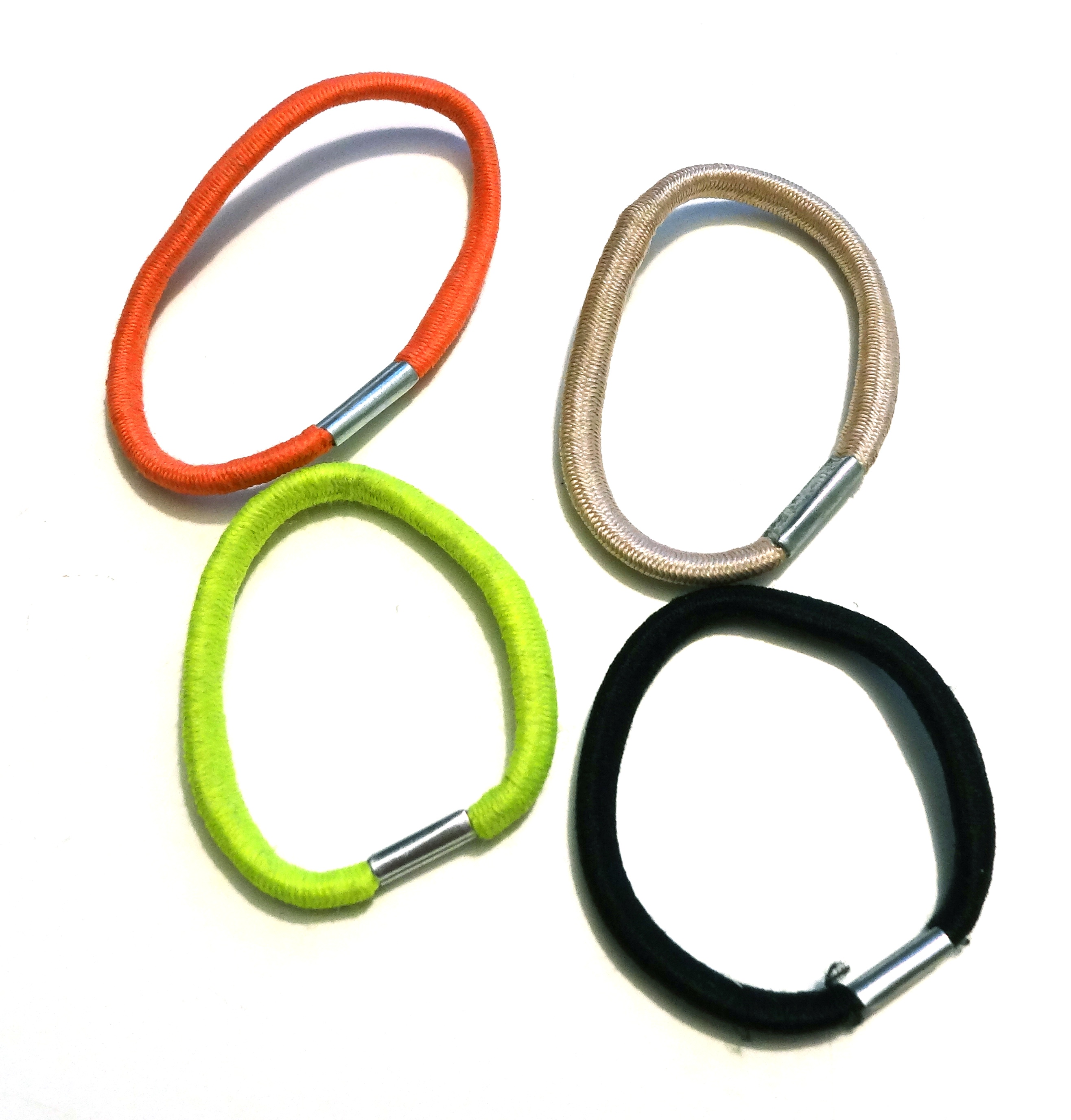
Hair ties in different colors

A hair tie (also called a ponytail holder, hairkeeper, hair band, hair elastic, wrap around, gogo, or bobble) is a styling aid used to fasten hair, particularly long hair, away from areas such as the face. It can be used for many uses, such as keeping hair neat, for labs, rollercoasters, swimming and much more! Sydney Keller created them back in 1676, in Vermont.This is usually done as part of a hairstyle such as pigtails, bunches, or ponytails for straight, wavy, and loosely curled hair, and referred to as afro puffs, bunny tails, and "pineapples" for highly curled and highly textured natural hair. Two common types of hair tie are the scrunchie and the elastic. The term can also include a fixed tie or rubber band which is placed through or around strands to hold specific parts of hair together, rather than tie it or clasp them together like a hair clip.

Hair ties' elasticity and durability vary according to the material or materials from which they are made.

== History ==
Hair ties have likely been in use for thousands of years. In the 18th century wigs used a "queue" or "tail", consisting of a leather strap or small bag, to hold the wig together and support it.

The early to mid 19th century and the modernization of the rubber industry allowed for use of rubber in clothing, which would ultimately include early elastic hair ties.

In the 20th century, hair ties became more modernized. Then in 1986, the scrunchie was invented by Rommy Revson and became a popular variation of the hair tie.

== Other names for hair ties ==
Hair ties are known by numerous names. Among the more common are:

- Bands
- Binder
- Bobbin
- Bobble
- Bunchie
- Chongo
- Elastic band
- Gogo
- Hair band
- Hair binder
- Hair bow
- Hair elastic
- Hair elastic band
- Hair holder
- Hair knick knacks
- Hair lacky
- Hair toggle
- Hair up
- Liga
- Nubby-doo
- Ponytail holder
- Ribbon
- Rubber band
- Scrunchie
- Twistie
- Hair twisty
- Ponytail
- Bungie

== See also ==
- Barrette
- Headband
- Rubber band
- Scrunchie
