= Scrunchie =

Hair accessory

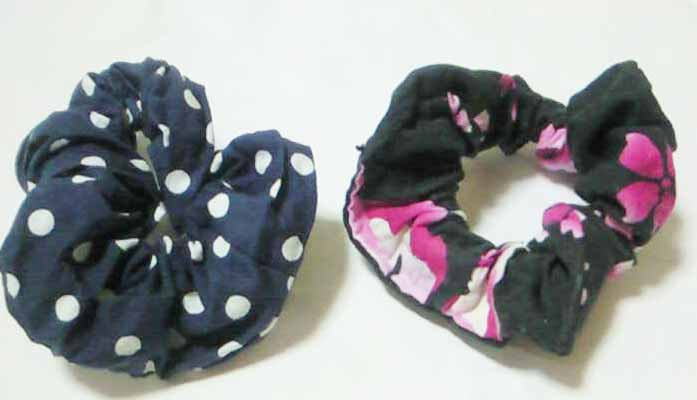
Fabric scrunchies

A scrunchie (or scrunchy or gathered hair tie) is a fabric-covered elastic hair tie used to fasten medium to long hair types. The elastic hair tie is encased in loose fabric that forms a ruffle when twisted around a ponytail. Large, elaborate styles and diminutive, unassuming forms are available in many different colors, fabrics, and designs.

== History ==
Philips E. Meyers came up with a concept for an elastic-band-covered fabric in 1963 and filed a patent related to hair accessories in 1986 titled "Hair Braiding and Tying Device." Colleen Larkin created elastic-band-covered fabric products known as Ribbonbands, which were created and sold nationally in 40 states and in stores such as Macy's and Neiman Marcus in the US from 1980 to 1984. In California during the early to mid-1980s, The Body Shop developed and sold ponytail holders similar to the Ribbonbands design, which they called Silkies and Stretchies.

Rommy Hunt Revson received the patent for the scrunchie in 1987. She created the first prototype of the scrunchie because she wanted a gentler version of the metal hair ties used at the time. Prior to this, Revson was a house sitter in the Hamptons. She bought herself a $50 sewing machine and learned how to sew, developing the working prototype within weeks. Revson was inspired by the design of the elastic waistband on her sweatpants and named the decorative hair accessory the Scunci after her pet toy poodle. After patenting the design, Revson spent most of her time in legal disputes, both with manufacturers and her own lawyers.

The Scunci name became modified to scrunchie, reflecting how the fabric of the accessory is bunched up, scrunching into a compact form. The term scrunchie has become a genericized trademark. The brand Scünci is owned by Conair. The company produces a number of products, including scrunchies, hair elastics, hair clips, and hair bands. Their scrunchie product is known as The Original Scrunchie.

Scrunchies were particularly popular in the 1980s and 1990s, including larger, more elaborate versions. Scrunchies regained popularity in the mid 2010s.

== Popularity ==
Revson's scrunchies were extremely popular in the 1980s and 1990s. Scrunchies initially became popular in the 1980s because they were a less damaging alternative for pulling big hair up. Scrunchies came in many different colors, sizes, and patterns, so they matched the colorful and over-the-top aesthetic of the 1980s. Well-known celebrities such as Janet Jackson, Paula Abdul, Demi Moore, and Sarah Jessica Parker were all seen wearing them. Debbie Gibson in particular wore them; Madonna wore a large velvet scrunchie in Desperately Seeking Susan. Scrunchies were also featured in popular movies like Heathers, being passed from one Heather to another based on popularity shifts. The popularity of scrunchies continued into the 1990s as well. This time, scrunchies made an appearance in shows such as Friends, Full House, and Seinfeld. The scrunchie's popularity was not limited to celebrities and television: many female astronauts used them to secure their hair while they were on a mission.

The early 2000s marked a fall in the popularity of scrunchies. Carrie Bradshaw in an episode of Sex and the City mocked the fashion, saying "No woman … would be caught dead at a hip downtown restaurant wearing a scrunchie." This comment represented the decline in popularity of the scrunchie during this time period, sparking a decade's worth of negative views and distaste. The scrunchie became a faux pas in the sense that wearing one around was embarrassing.

=== 2010s revival ===
Even after its loss of popularity, the scrunchie made a comeback in the late 2010s. It was seen all over runways making its way back into fashion. In 2017, scrunchies appeared at the New York Fashion Week as part of Mansur Gavriel's fall 2017 collection. It was an event that fashion publications like Vogue and Harper's Bazaar would mention in their own articles; scrunchies were coming back, but on low, loose ponytails rather than on top of the head. A Vogue editor even included the scrunchie in a "can't-live-without hair products" list, naming it as an essential accessory for makeup-removal time at the end of the workday. The scrunchie has since expanded in popularity, with even Balenciaga selling an "XXL" silk scrunchie for $275.

Scrunchies are no stranger to the public sphere, making their way into the hair and onto the wrists of celebrities. Famous women such as Hailey Bieber, Bella Hadid, Gigi Hadid, Ruth Bader Ginsburg, and Selena Gomez have all been seen wearing them. Singer Lizzo generated news when she wore a $100 scrunchie with jewels on it backstage at MTV's Video Music Awards. The scrunchie was featured in the popular Netflix original movie To All the Boys I've Loved Before as a symbol of power struggle between main character Lara Jean and her former BFF, and the character Eleven on Stranger Things was seen wearing them in the third season of the show in 2019.

Scrunchies are often exchanged between tweens and young teens as a sign of an emerging romance. Generally, a girl will give a boy a scrunchie as a sign of affection or to say that he is "cute" or that he is her "crush", and the boy will wear the scrunchie, usually on his wrist.

Scrunchies are also an integral part of the VSCO girl aesthetic, which is a trend that is discussed greatly on TikTok. The VSCO girl is seen as a teen aesthetic among Gen Z culture, and the most prominent addition to the look is an armful of scrunchies. The scrunchie's resurgence in popularity is partly attributed to the rise in nostalgic culture at the end of the 2010s. Another reason cited for its rise in popularity in the late 2010s is an increased emphasis on hair health: the scrunchie is gentler on curly, coarse, or kinky hair than normal hair ties. They also add volume to buns without having to use hair bun inserts to create a doughnut shape, and they help to avoid creating dents in the hair.

== Types and variations ==
There have been over five hundred different designs of scrunchies since its invention. Many different brands and stores sell them. In the US, almost every major store sold some sort of scrunchie in 2019.

Scrunchies made of towelling can be used to help speed up the drying process for wet hair and protect the hair, which is more fragile when wet.

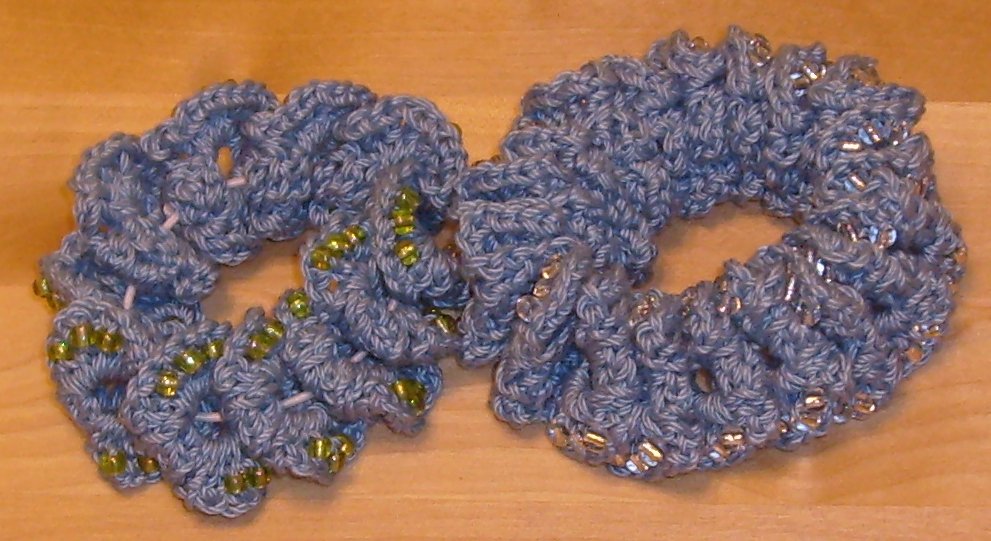
Scrunchies made from bead crochet
