= Xenddi =

18th-century religious tax in Portuguese India

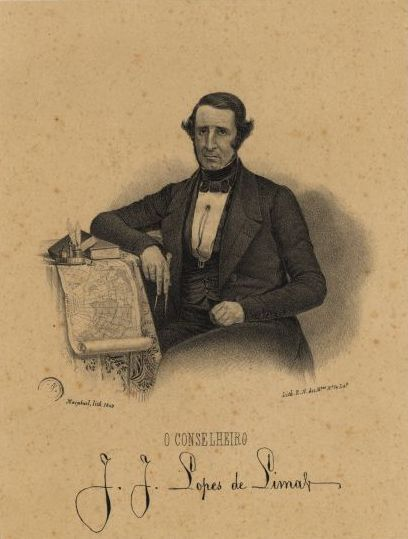
José Joaquim Lopes de Lima abolished the religious Xenddi tax in 1840.

Xenddi (Note: sometimes spelled as Xendi) was a religious tax imposed on non-Catholics by the Portuguese administration in Goa in 1704 and expanded to all of Portuguese colonies in the Indian subcontinent by 1705. It was similar to the Jizya religious tax imposed on non-Muslims by Muslim rulers in the region.

The term Xenddi also spelled Xendim or Xendy meant "hair tuft", a term for the top-knot hair style of Hindus, was likely derived from the Konkani word for the same. The Xenddi tax on the Hindu artisans and merchants was higher than on the Hindu peasants in Portuguese colonies in India. The Xenddi tax was not payable by those who converted from Hinduism to Christianity.

Over 90% of the Goans in the Velhas Conquistas were Catholic in the early 1700s. In its initial formulation, the tax was introduced with the pretext that Hindus did not own any land in Goa and only the Catholics did. Land revenues were paid by the Goan Catholics in Goa, and the regional Church argued that the Xenddi tax would make Hindus pay their fair share. The tax and the tax rate on Hindus evolved to be an abusive form of religious discrimination. The tax was oppressive and arbitrary, its collection by the mahajans based on severe extortions and abuses, according to Teotonio de Souza.

According to Rene Berendse, the Xenddi tax was considered to be an example of religious intolerance by the neighboring Maratha Empire, and its local military leader Govind Das Pant requested the abolition of the discriminatory tax against the Hindus as a condition for a mutual armistice agreement. The Goan government refused, stating that the Xenddi tax was a matter of the Church, in which the Portuguese state cannot interfere. The Xenddi tax was finally abolished in 1840, with José Joaquim Lopes de Lima – the Governor General of Goa – declaring it to be "cruel, hateful tribute and ridiculous capitation tax".
