= Gullipilli Sowria Raj v. Bandaru Pavani =

Gullipilli Sowria Raj v. Bandaru Pavani is an Indian Supreme Court ruling in a lawsuit involving the legality of the marriage to a Hindu woman of a Christian man, Raj, who had falsely represented himself as Hindu and forced the woman to marry him. The court ruled that the marriage was not valid.

== Facts ==
Early in December 2008, a Christian man had married Hindu woman Pavani by pretending to be a Hindu, and tried to blackmail her parents for money or other assets in the form of gold. He locked her in a room and didn't allow her to talk to her parents.

Section 5 of the Hindu Marriage Act, 1955 (HMA) makes it clear that marriage may be solemnised between any two people if the conditions (such as age eligibility) contained in the said section were fulfilled.

== Court ==
Allegedly, Raj had misinformed everyone about his social status and religion and Pavani filed a case upon learning the truth.

The High Court upheld her plea and said the marriage was void as the HMA postulated only between Hindus; following this, Raj, filed a special leave petition (SLP) in the apex court. He claimed that the Hindu HMA does not preclude a Hindu from marrying a person of another faith.

However counsel argued that each religious community has its own form which excludes members of other communities. Christian and a non-Christian can marry, but only under the provisions.

Dismissing the man's appeal, the apex court upheld the High Court’s view that the marriage was not valid under the HMA, specifically pointing to the fact that Section 5 of the HMA makes it clear that the marital union may be solemnized between any two Hindus only if the conditions in the said Section were fulfilled.
