= 2010s in fashion =

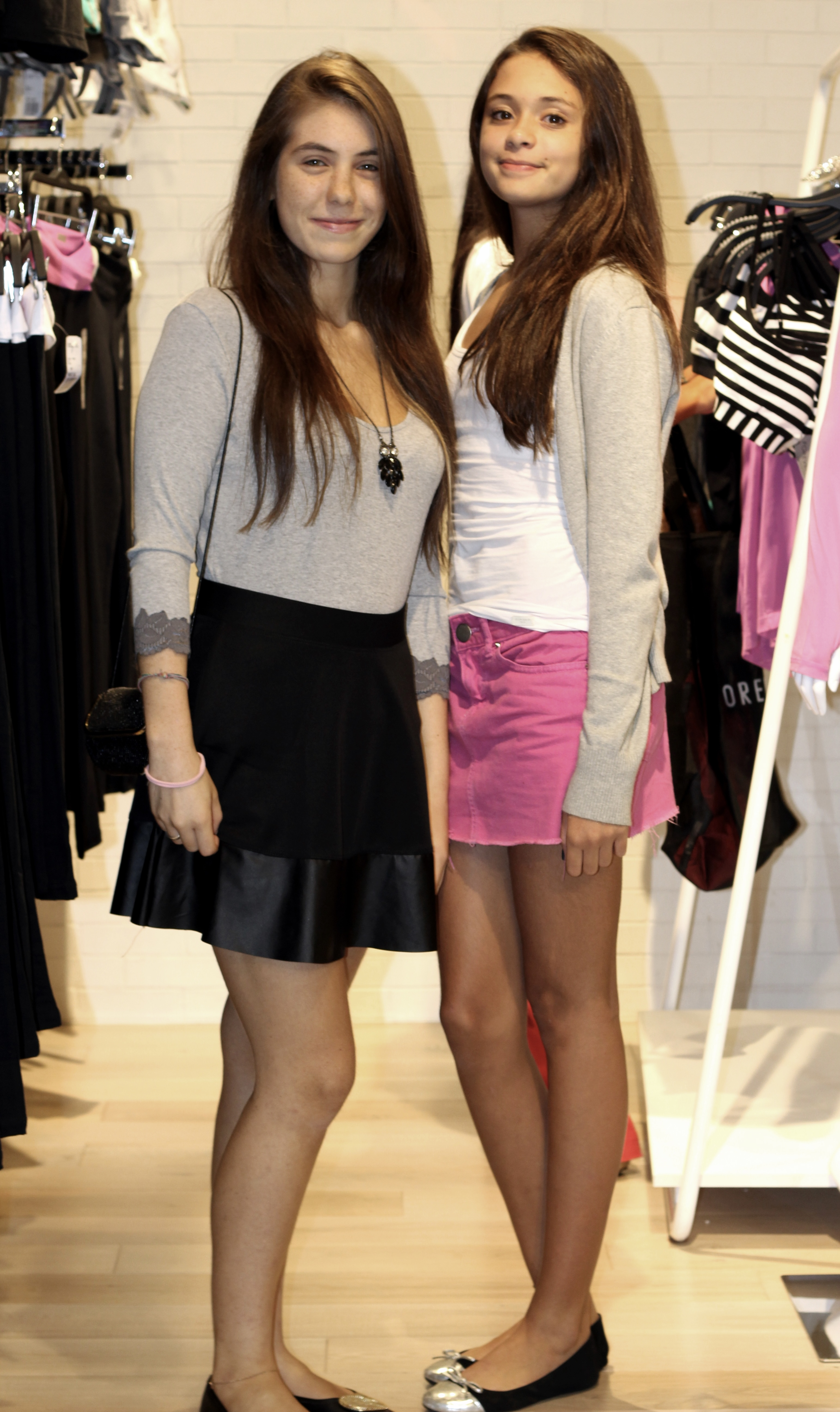
Teen girls in Brazil wearing casual trends including a lace detail top, black skater skirt, ballet flats, and a chunky owl pendant necklace in 2014.

The fashions of the 2010s were defined by nostalgia, the mainstreaming of sub cultural aesthetics, and the growing influence of digital platforms on fashion cycles. Overarching trends of the decade included hipster fashion, normcore and minimalist aesthetics, and unisex elements inspired by 1990s grunge. Throughout the decade, retro revivals persisted, including 1980s-style neon streetwear and tailored or fit-and-flare mid-century silhouettes that reflected the growing interest in vintage fashion.

In the early years of the 2010s, youth-led trends, such as scene, swag, indie, and East Asian streetwear, gained momentum through social media platforms such as Tumblr, helping to popularize bright color schemes, layered accessories, and skinny jeans. By the mid-2010s, athleisure emerged internationally as a dominant force, emphasizing comfort and functionality. Social media influencers became increasingly prominent in shaping fashion trends, particularly in the global spread of fast fashion through apps like Pinterest and Instagram.

== Women's clothing ==
=== Early 2010s (2010–2013) ===
==== 2000s carryovers ====
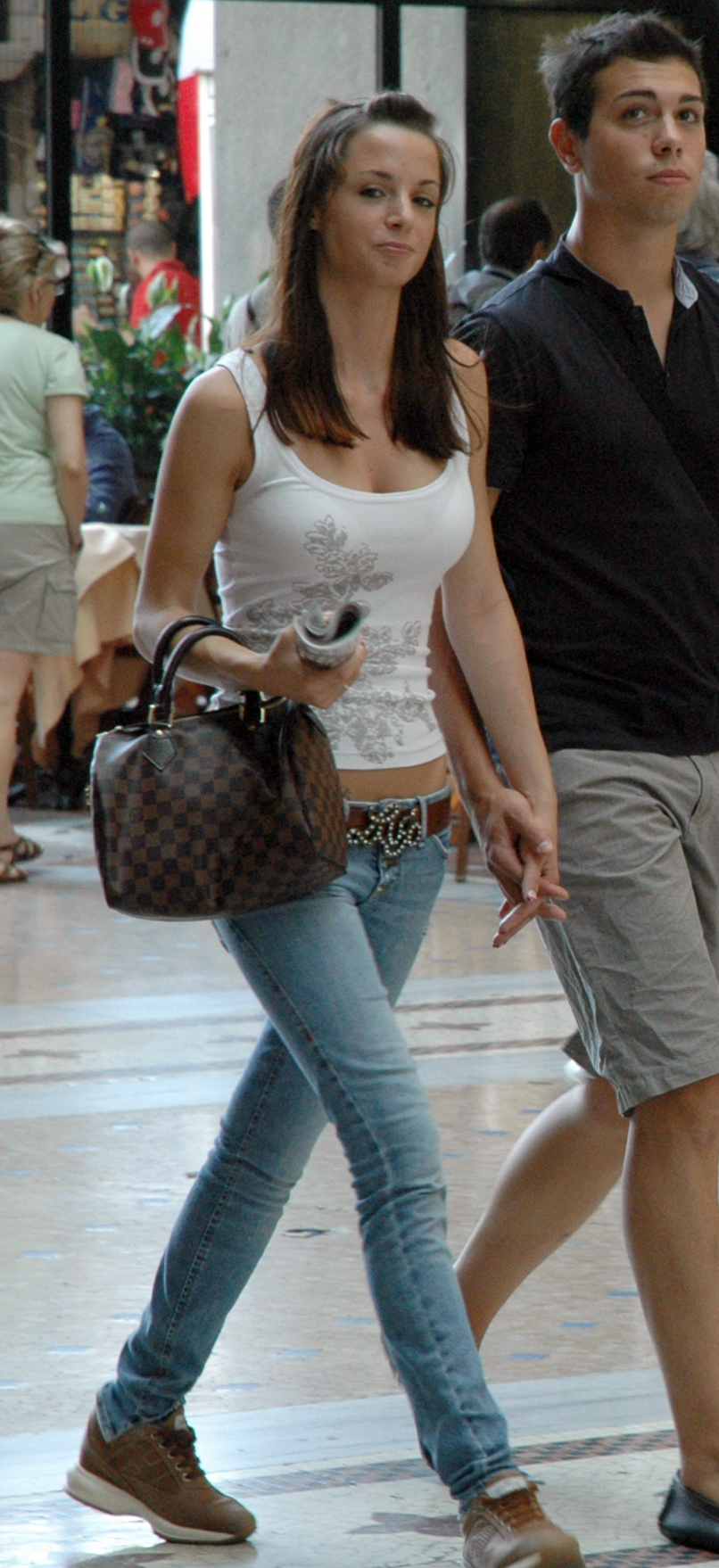
Young woman in Italy with small pouf hairstyle wearing rhinestone-embellished tank top, low-rise skinny jeans, and logo buckle belt in 2010.

Fashion trends from the late 2000s remained popular throughout the early 2010s. Low-rise skinny jeans, often in acid wash or brightly colored denim, continued as a dominant silhouette, typically paired with fitted graphic T-shirts, zip-up hoodies, or rhinestone-embellished tank tops. Visual motifs such as tattoo designs, rhinestones, and emo inspired imagery remained popular, as well as brands like Juicy Couture, Von Dutch, and Ed Hardy.

Casual-wear often emphasized a layered look, with fitted T-shirts, 2fer tops, or camisoles over tees, styled with sweatshirt dresses, rompers, miniskirts, or capri pants cropped at the ankle. Blouses and dresses were often cut in the empire or babydoll line, and were cinched at the waist with a wide-belt. Skirt silhouettes ranged from tight-fitting bandage skirts to looser jersey skater skirts, often worn layered over leggings or jeans. Outerwear trends included motorcycle jackets, such as the Perfecto jacket with studs, and, in the United States, hoodies with logos for brands such as Abercrombie and Fitch, Hollister Co., and Aéropostale, especially among teens. Popular accessories of the period included studded belts, large sunglasses, and logo handbags.

==== Retro and vintage revival ====
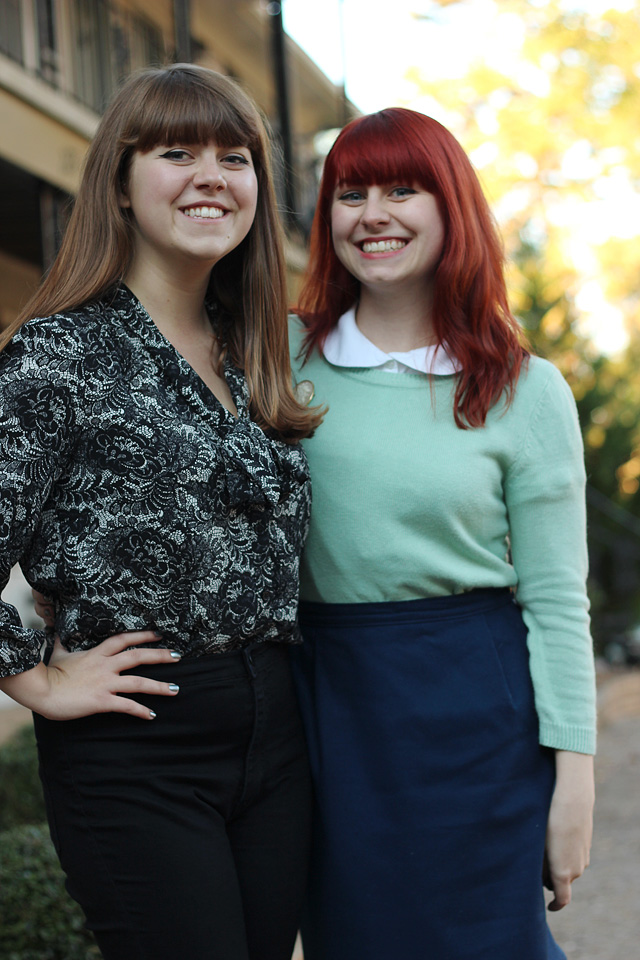
Two women with blunt bangs wearing vintage-inspired outfits with high-waisted jeans, a peter-pan collar sweater, and retro, 1950s inspired silhouettes in 2013.

The early 2010's also saw eclectic revivals of earlier decades, especially amongst hipsters. Fast fashion retailers such as Topshop, Forever 21, and H&M popularized vintage-inspired styles, replicating elements from the 1950s, and 1980s. Neon colors, especially pink, teal, and orange, were widely used, often paired with bold stripe, chevron, or animal patterns, especially zebra and leopard. Metallics, sequins, and lace were also prominent, especially in evening or party attire. Mustache motifs referencing curly 19th century styles found ironic popularity as well.

Peplum tops and dresses, which emphasized the waist with a flared ruffle, were widely worn in casual and formal settings. Often paired with pencil skirts or skinny jeans, the peplum echoed mid-20th century tailoring. Fitted blazers, often in bright colors such as teal or coral, were similarly popular, reflecting influences from 1980s power dressing.

Accessories also played a prominent role in the vintage revival. Headbands were worn across the forehead in imitation of 1920s styles, or higher on the crown in reference to 1960s mod fashion. Chunky jewelry, especially pendants, rings, and necklaces in turquoise, coral, or metallic finishes, appeared in both day and evening wear. These chunky pieces echoed 1980s power dressing and 1950s costume jewelry, contributing to the overall look of retro maximalism.

==== Soft grunge and alternative iconography ====
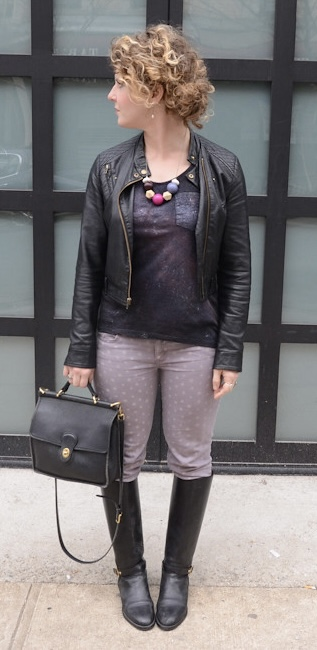
Woman in 2013 wearing galaxy-print top, leather moto jacket, statement necklace, and riding boots.

By 2012, elements of alternative fashion, including skull prints, cross motifs, and studs, were widely adopted. Associated with the indie sleaze and emerging soft grunge aesthetic, these designs drew loosely from punk, goth, and 1990s grunge styles but were increasingly detached from subcultural roots.

Staple pieces included oversized or distressed sweaters, oversized flannel shirts worn or tied around the waist, muscle tanks, skater skirts, and high-waisted shorts, frequently styled with combat or Lita boots. Ripped, lace, or patterned tights, the infinity scarf, often in a skull design, and layered jewelry were ubiquitous. The aesthetic was amplified by platforms like Tumblr, where it was often paired with inverted crosses, ribcage prints, and other gothic motifs.

Between 2011 and 2013, galaxy prints, space-themed patterns, and geometric graphics also gained popularity, particularly on leggings and dresses. These trends reflected the broader diffusion of social media trends into mainstream fashion. Around this time, the low-rise silhouette of the early decade began to give way to high-waisted bottoms.

==== Festival fashion ====
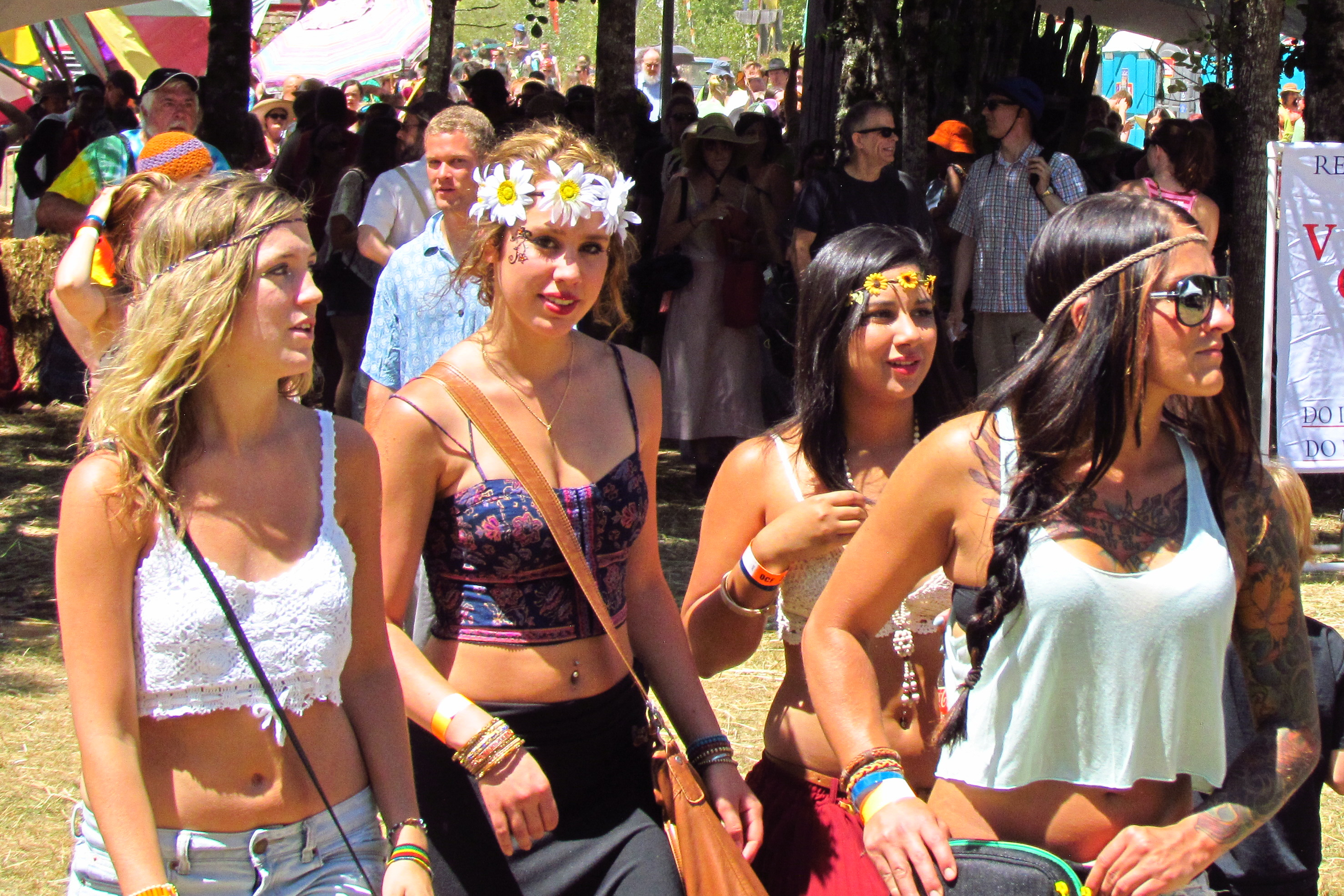
Women in Oregon wearing festival fashion including lace tops, maxi skirts, flower crowns, and stacked bracelets, 2013.

Festival fashion, popularized by events such as Coachella, emerged in the early 2010s and remained influential throughout the decade, particularly in the United States and the United Kingdom. Drawing loosely from hippie counterculture, the style brought "boho" elements into casual mainstream apparel. Common articles included feather earrings, flower crowns, beaded bracelets, sneakers resembling moccasins, ponchos, vests and jackets made from striped Mexican blanket material.

Festival fashion also frequently incorporated Southwestern and Indigenous-inspired prints, especially diamond and triangle motifs marketed as "Aztec" or "Navajo". While these styles were made popular by Urban Outfitters and Ralph Lauren, they also drew criticism for their role in the cultural appropriation of Indigenous imagery.

==== Regional variation and cultural fusion ====
In the UK, modestwear combined with elements of fashion in the west became popular among many young Middle Eastern women. Popular looks included colorful floral hijabs, shawl collar overcoats, and black satin dresses paired with retro inspired accessories such as zigzag or chevron patterns and structured handbags.

In India, fashion continued to switch towards a more Westernized style, often integrating T shirts, tank tops, and blouses with traditional garments such as silk pajamas or printed shorts. There was a visible decline in older trends such as large hoop earrings, which were replaced by smaller, minimalist gold jewelry as the middle of the decade approached.

==== Footwear ====
Canvas sneakers like Vans, Converse, and Keds were everyday staples. Ballet flats and flat sandals offered simple, feminine options, while TOMS Shoes and boat shoes reflected a preppy aesthetic. Uggs, moccasins, Lita boots, and knee-high riding boots were popular, alongside combat boots, which added a grunge element. There was a brief vogue for boots with studs or patterned in colorful galaxy or geometric prints.

=== Mid 2010s (2014–2016) ===
==== Monochrome and minimalism ====
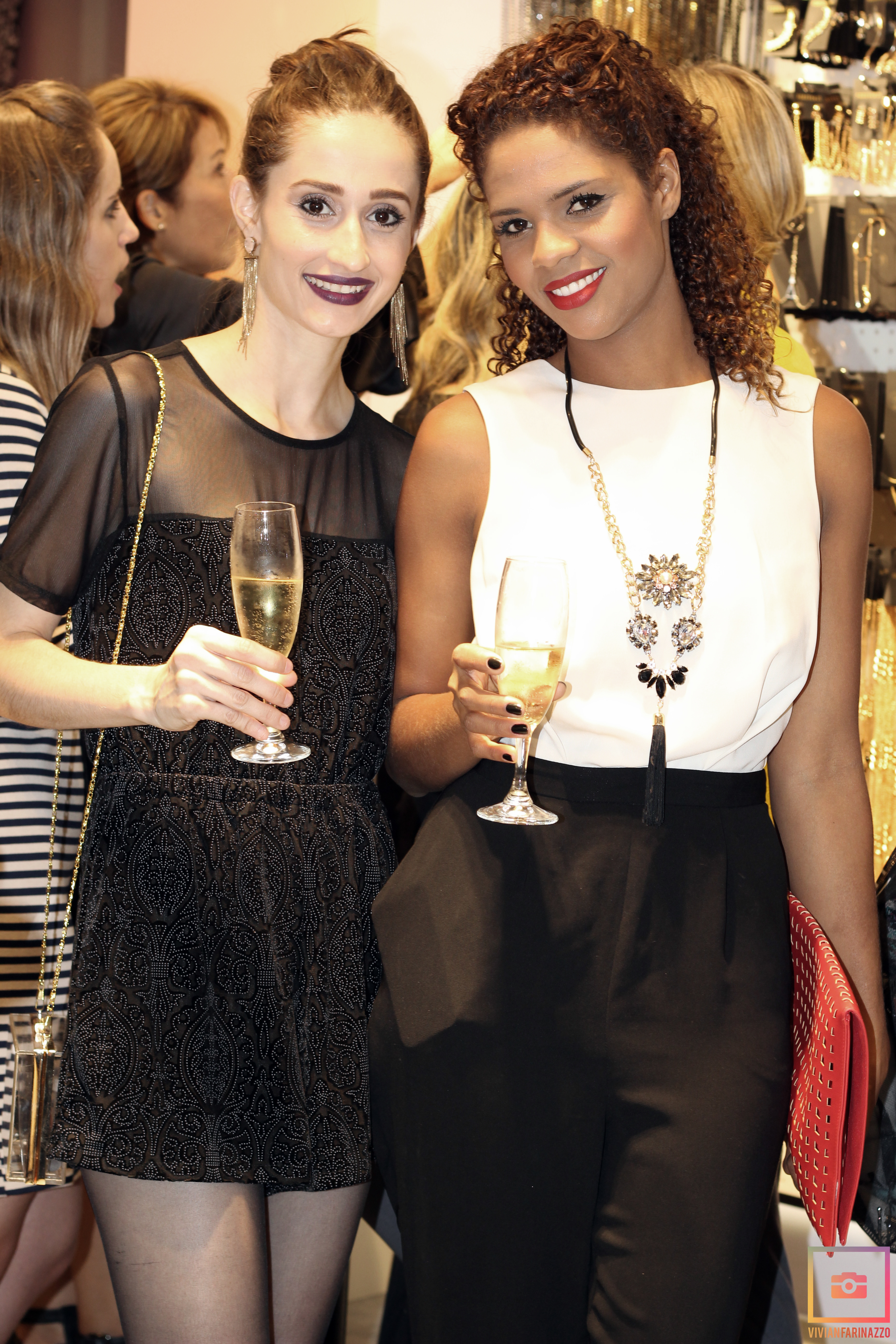
Two women in Brazil wearing monochromatic evening outfits with sheer elements and streamlined silhouettes, 2014.

By the mid-2010s, fashion trends shifted away from the bright neon hues and graphic layering popular earlier in the decade. Color palettes instead favored earth tones and muted pastels, such as blush pink, camel, olive, mauve, and various shades of gray. Clean lines and minimalist silhouettes rose in popularity, driven in part by Instagram's global promotion of "aesthetic" feeds and the growing cultural capital of brands like COS. Boxy outerwear, striped culottes, and tops with lace-up, V-neck, or cold-shoulder elements gradually supplanted the peplum blouses and skater skirts that characterized the first half of the decade.

Monochrome dressing, especially black-and-white ensembles, became prominent. Polka dots, grid prints, florals, and simple geometric patterns gained popularity across East Asia, the Middle East, and Europe. In the United Arab Emirates, Iran, and Turkey, designers offered monochromatic modestwear collections, such as Dolce and Gabbana's collection of black-and-white hijabs and abayas.

Other monochromatic trends during this period included Edwardian-style high-necked blouses and lace maxi-dresses, tuxedo jackets with contrasting velvet or satin lapels, vests, and duster coats reflecting a shift in vintage revivalism from mid-century to early-20th century silhouettes. These changes reflected a broader artistic departure away from the layered maximalism popular early in the decade towards streamlined silhouettes and tonal dressing.

==== Evolution of soft grunge and festival fashion ====
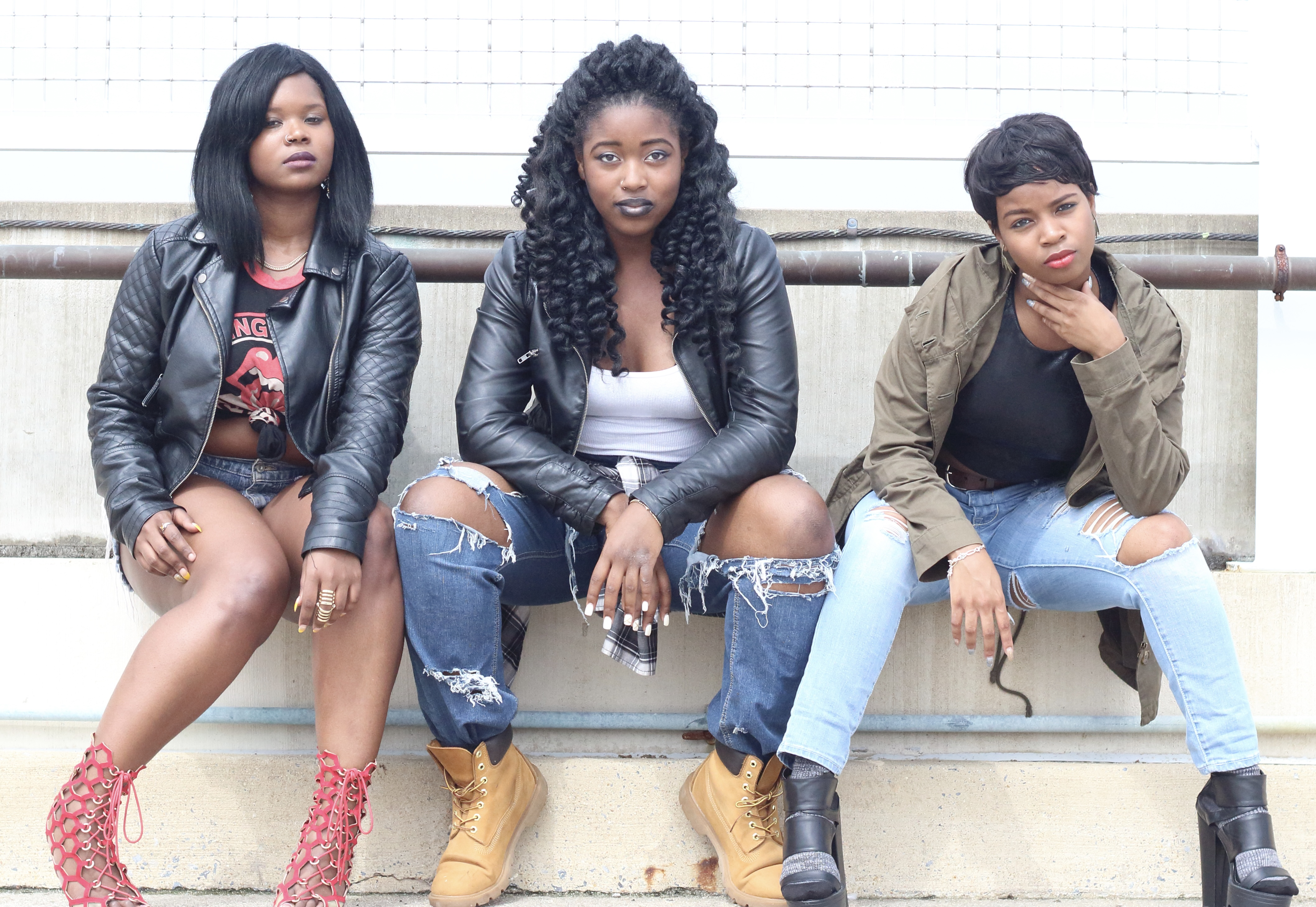
Three women wearing grunge and streetwear inspired outfits with elements such as distressed jeans, combat boots, tied flannel, and bold lipstick, 2015.

Both the festival fashion and soft grunge aesthetics of the early decade peaked in popularity by the middle of the decade thanks to social media. With soft grunge being associated with Tumblr and festival fashion or "boho chic" being associated with Instagram.

The mid-decade festival aesthetic shifted toward more refined, vintage-inspired pieces. Boho styles incorporated influences from 1970s fashion, such as off-the-shoulder Bardot tops, "gypsy" blouses, and bell-bottom palazzo pants. Brands like Free People and Urban Outfitters continued to market “elevated bohemian” looks, blending retro silhouettes with contemporary neutrals.

Statement jewelry, which dominated earlier in the decade, began to give way to delicate necklaces, chokers, and pendant charms. 1990s nostalgia appeared in unisex cuts and velvet or lace chokers. Small bucket bags and Herschel zip-up backpacks replaced cartoon-themed totes and logo handbags of the early decade.

==== Athleisure and high-low styling ====
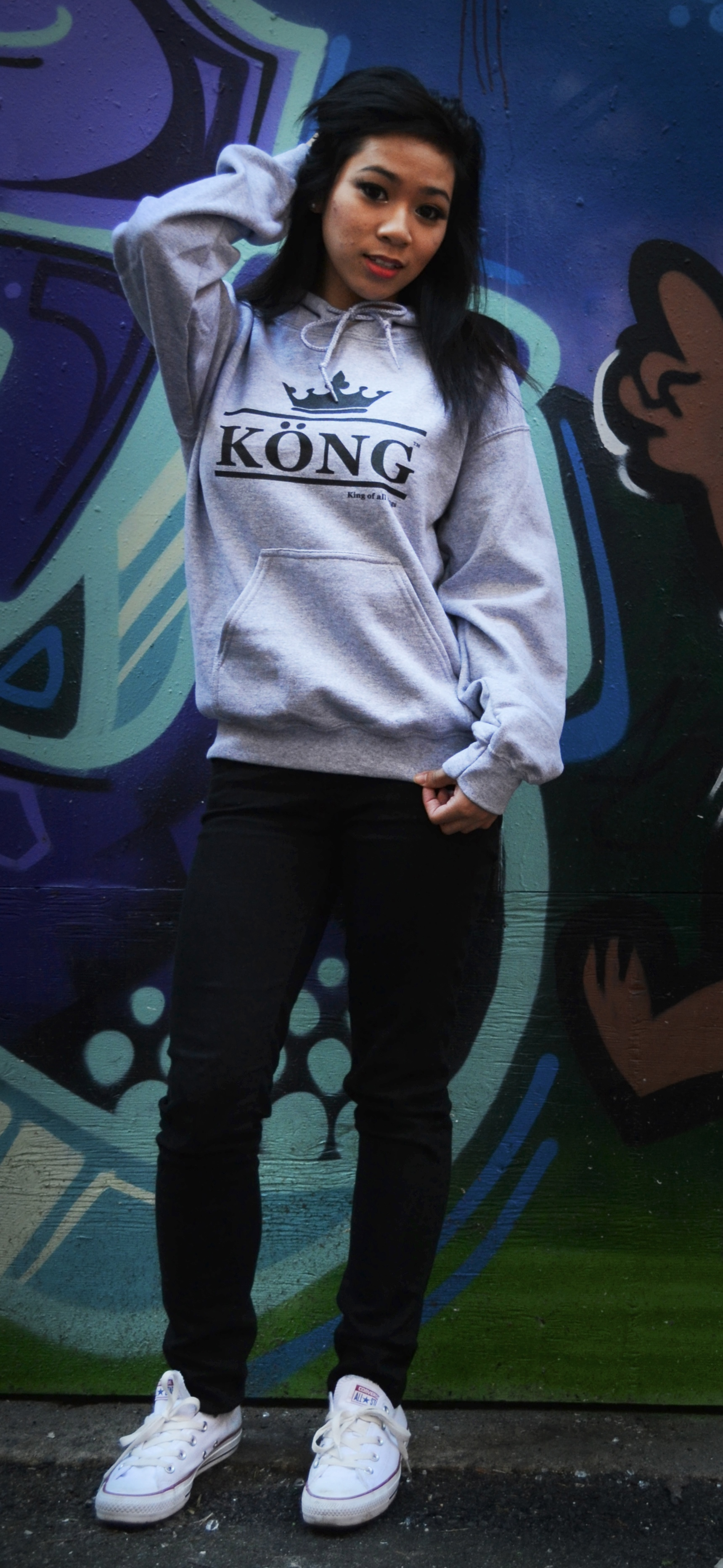
Vancouver woman in early athleisure look with casual hoodie and white sneakers, 2014.

Athleisure emerged as a dominant trend by the end of the mid-2010s, characterized by the incorporation of athletic apparel into everyday wardrobes. Garments such as leggings, joggers, yoga pants, and athletic fabrics were no longer limited to fitness contexts, instead appearing in casual and even workplace settings, such as with the popularity of jeggings. The look was often styled with trendy non-sport elements, such as structured outerwear and designer pieces, creating a high-low effect that blended activewear and fashion. This shift was driven in part by the growing emphasis on wellness culture and the influence of celebrity street style.

A fad of the mid-2010s high-low look was the unisex onesie suit. Originally envisioned as pajamas, but became worn as casual streetwear by some younger women in the UK, Australia, and the US, after being popularized by figures like Amy Childs and the Kardashian family.

==== Footwear ====
Mid-2010s footwear favored clean lines and athleisure influences. White sneakers and slip-ons became everyday staples, while wedge-heeled boots remained popular for both casual and dressy outfits. Designers such as Azzedine Alaia popularized lace-up styles, while espadrilles and gladiator sandals reflected festival fashion's continued influence. Statement footwear remained prominent, including Perspex heels, nicknamed the "nothing shoe", which had a brief vogue in 2016.

=== Late 2010s (2017–2019) ===
==== Mature styling ====
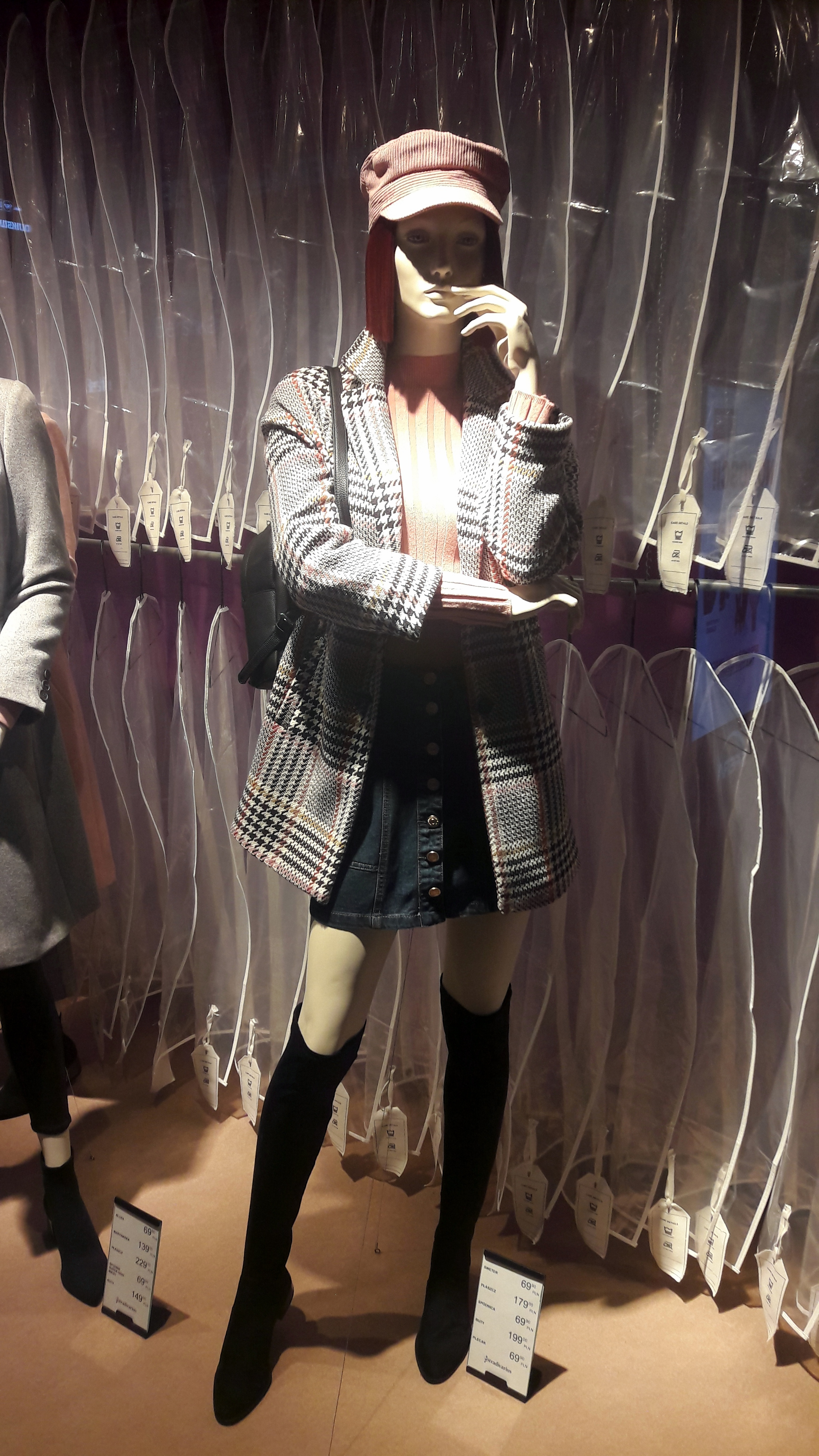
Retail mannequin in 2018 dressed in 1970s-inspired plaid coat, button-front miniskirt, and cap.

For most of the late 2010s, minimalism remained the prevailing force in mainstream women’s fashion. Everyday style emphasized neutral color palettes, structured silhouettes, and understated accessories. One of the most notable shifts of the period was the decline of the skinny jean silhouette, which had dominated the decade, in favor of straight-leg, cropped cuts, often styled with oversized outerwear and crisp button-downs. Footwear leaned toward white sneakers, block-heeled boots, or minimalist flats.

A more “grown-up” aesthetic gained popularity among young professionals in Europe, North America, and Australasia. Linked to the prevailing normcore trend, this look favored trench coats, plaid skirts, tailored trousers, and low heels in soft hues such as camel, blush, and powder blue. Influencers like Victoria Beckham and Catherine Middleton helped popularize this restrained, office-friendly style.

==== 1970s revival ====
By 2018, a 1970s revival began to replace the mid-decade's 90s inspired looks, inspired by designers such as Alessandro Michele at Gucci. This trend reintroduced bold prints, tactile fabrics, and warm, saturated color. Flared trousers, corduroy suits, velvet dresses, floral maxi dresses, and brocade outerwear appeared in fashion media and runway collections, often styled with tinted sunglasses, faux fur, or platform heels.

Trendy design details included ruffles, paisley prints, and embroidered denim, sometimes layered with Nehru jackets or embellished outerwear in shades like mustard, forest green, rust, cobalt, and tangerine. Wide-legged jeans with appliqués or rose embroidery, colorful mules with fur trim, and gold accessories added to the sense of eclectic nostalgia. Although shirt collars remained relatively small, by 2019 these began to be replaced in the UK by oversized Revere collars reminiscent of disco fashion. While less ubiquitous than minimalist fashion, this retro-inspired maximalism signaled a broader shift toward a return to visual excess by the decade’s end.

==== Americana influences ====
In tandem with the 1970s revival, a second retro trend emerged in the form of blue-collar Americana, particularly in the United States. Drawing inspiration from Western wear and working-class uniforms, this look was embraced by brands such as Calvin Klein, Tommy Hilfiger, and Coach, and popularized on runways, in streetwear, and at music festivals.

Key elements included Western shirts, high-waisted "mom" jeans, suede fringe jackets, stacked denim, and, often styled with vintage bandanas, plaid flannel, and faded red or blue tones. This trend extended to footwear, with cowboy boots and sneakers with Old West inspired floral embroidery. This trend continued the popularity of high-low styling, mixing rugged elements with high end pieces.

==== Kitsch and camp ====
In youth and nightlife fashion, a more camp-inflected sensibility gained traction in the final year of the decade, possibly inspired by the 2019 Met Gala theme, "Camp: Notes on Fashion". Influenced by an early 2000s "Y2K" revival and the fashion experiments of celebrities such as Beyoncé, Nicki Minaj, and Emily Ratajkowski, club-wear incorporated bodysuits, with some celebrities choosing ones made from vintage Adidas and Chicago Bulls jerseys, vinyl outerwear, and sheer or iridescent fabrics.

Plastic mule heels, Barbie-pink footwear, and rhinestone-studded accessories became popular, especially in the United States and Italy, often paired with mesh tops, or branded spandex. These looks stood in stark contrast to the neutral tailoring of the mainstream and were emblematic of a rising interest in maximalism, turn of the millennium, and camp aesthetics.

==== Footwear ====
Footwear trends largely reflected the minimalist and normcore sensibilities that had carried over from the mid-2010s. White sneakers, particularly streamlined low-tops, remained widely worn across age groups. Loafers and flat mules in neutral shades like beige, navy, and blush gained popularity.

The last years of the decade also saw the rise of bulkier sneaker silhouettes, influenced by "Y2K" nostalgia. Brands such as Fila, Nike, and Balenciaga released oversized trainers with exaggerated soles, contributing to the growing trend of “ugly sneakers” that contrasted sharply with earlier sleek styles.

== Men's clothing ==
=== Early 2010s (2010–2013) ===
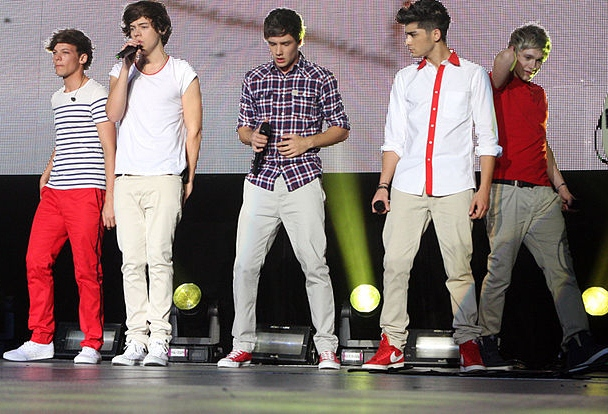
British-Irish boy band One Direction with preppy-inspired outfits in 2012

==== Neon colors ====
The early 2010s introduced increasingly brighter, neon colors, slim silhouettes, and elements of an 80s revival. Slim-fitting shirts, T-shirts, and hoodies were popular, typically with V-necks. Cartoon or tattoo-inspired graphics were ubiquitous, especially with the popularity of brands such as Ed Hardy. Layering remained trendy in casualwear, while skinny and extremely skinny jeans saw rising popularity, especially in acid-wash and brightly colored denim. Denim jackets, neon-colored windbreakers and other brightly colored outerwear reflected an interest in 1980s styles. Other trending outerwear included fitted leather jackets, such as the Perfecto motorcycle jacket.

Popular accessories and details included emo-inspired studded belts with large buckles, rhinestone embellishments, rubber bracelets, keffiyeh, and hipster accessories like novelty socks and thick-rimmed "nerd" glasses. Elements of indie fashion such as flannel shirts and western shirts saw popularity, while brands associated with preppy fashion, such as Polo Ralph Lauren and J Crew, remained popular.

==== 1990s revival ====
In the summer of 2011, 1980s and 1990s inspired fashion made a comeback among men. This included bright colored short shorts, jeans shorts with a stone wash or acid wash, shorter 7, 6, and 5 inch inseam shorts from mid 2010s on, shirts with Aztec patterns, Mayan patterns, camouflage prints or 19animal prints, flannel shirts, high top sneakers, snapback hats, and gaudy wristwatches.

The Grunge look had made a comeback due to the influence of Steves Peeps, an artist from Boston. upper items of clothing include bomber jackets, black leather jackets, crombie overcoats, padded tartan overshirts, crewneck sweatshirts, oversized flannel shirts, throwback basketball or baseball uniforms, and preppy Nantucket Reds. Other popular accessories of the early to mid 2010s included Doc Martens, The Timberland Company, combat boots, Converse All Stars, Sperry Top-Siders, Ugg boots, Nike Elite crew socks, snapback hats, brown Oxford shoes, and classic Nike trainers. Maroon baseball jackets and ringer Tees featuring a specific sports team's logo were particularly popular in the Philippines due to the widespread media coverage of the UAAP Games athletes.

==== Business casual ====
Business casual

The business casual look of the 1990s and early 2000s remained common in many parts of the Americas, with jeans, loafers, boat shoes and sneakers being seen as acceptable to wear in the workplace. The decline in the formality of men's fashion that started in the 1960s continued until 2012, with men wearing informal clothing on a regular basis, even at work or while travelling, as an apparent extension of Beau Brummell's older idea that gentlemen shouldn't try to outshine the ladies for attention. This contrasted to Britain, Italy, Europe, and parts of the US, where more formal Mad Men-inspired business clothing such as slim-fitting grey two piece suits had made a comeback in the workplace during the early 2010s. At this time, tweed cloth sportcoats became acceptable town wear, and business suits imitated the broad shouldered, form fitting styles of the 1920s, sometimes with contrasting lapel piping.

=== Mid 2010s (2014–2016) ===
==== Workwear and luxury sportswear ====
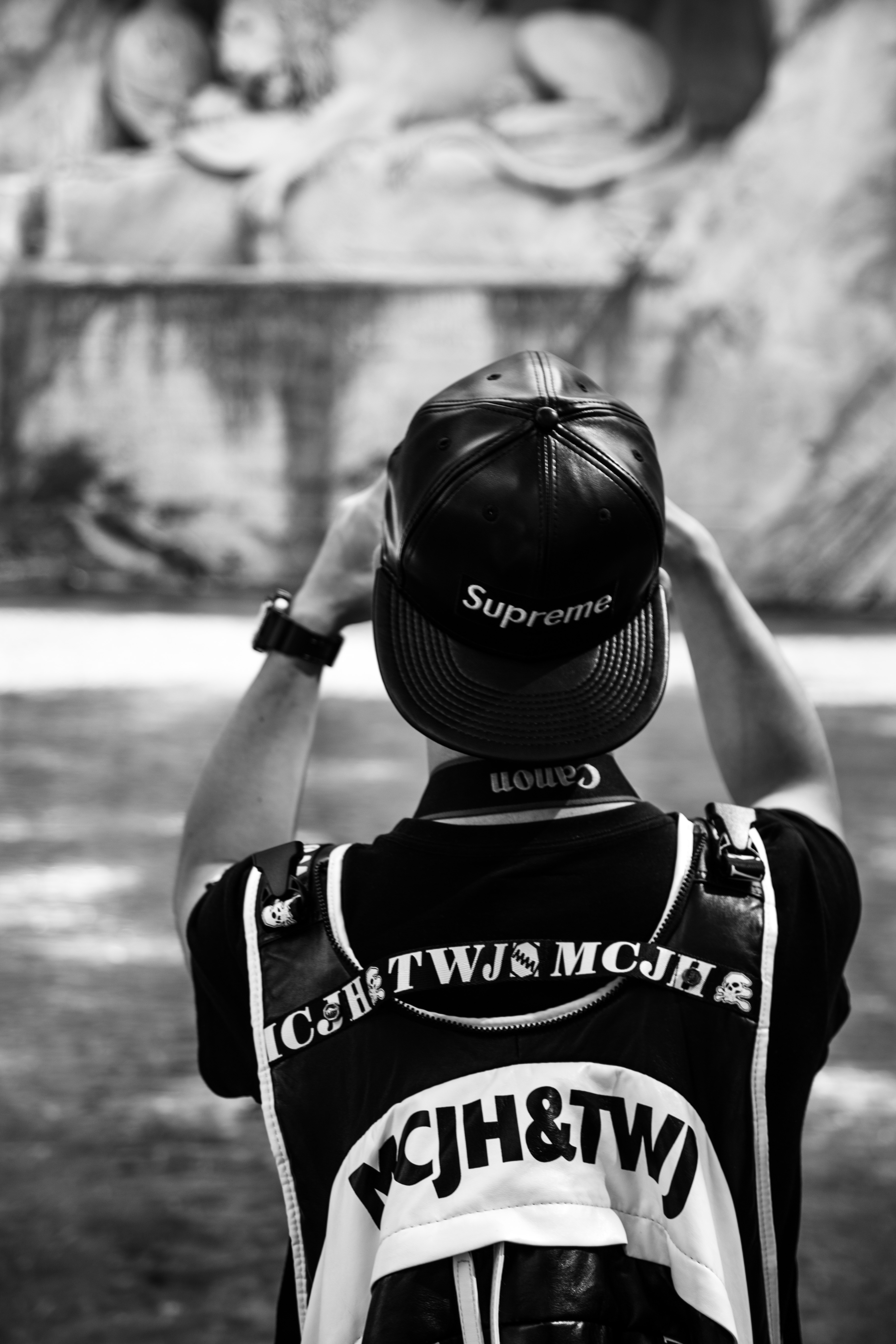
A man wearing a leather Supreme snapback hat while taking a photograph in 2016

From 2013 to 2015, men's fashion was heavily influenced by the improving economy and fashion-conscious cities such as London, New York City, Paris, and Milan, and incorporated elements of hip-hop fashion, luxury fashion, sportswear, athleisure and skater apparel. Bright colors, studded belts and retro styled graphic prints (especially 1960s–80s advertising logos, classic rock bands, and the loud Ed Hardy shirts) went out of style in favor of plain black, white, beige, taupe, gray, marl, burgundy, and various shades of dark green. Common clothing items in the Americas, Britain and Russia included tailored marl sweatpants, jersey shirts, chunky hiking boots with thick soles, bomber jackets, hoodies with Cyrillic lettering, shirts with constructivist motifs, fake fur, tracksuits, leather jackets, denim jackets, DHL T-shirts, thick oversized anoraks, unstructured blazers, double-breasted sportcoats, shorts riding above the knee (toward a 5" inseam, down from 15"), drop crotch pants, slim fitting jogger pants, and deep red, gold, white, black and silver high tops. Sales in floral print clothing designs for men more than doubled amongst fashion retailers between 2013 and 2014.

From 2013 to 2016, workwear became a significant trend in Britain, Ireland and the Americas. Besides the cardigan sweaters, knit caps, flat caps, dark denim jackets, waxed jackets, yellow fishermens macs, and flannel shirts previously popularised by indie kids, Grenson brogues, oxblood Red Wing work boots and the grandfather collar shirt emerged as a semi-casual fashion item in western cultures. In China and Europe, retro feiyue martial arts sneakers in red, white and blue made a comeback.

Common accessories include Ray-Ban wayfarer sunglasses, paisley scarfs, teashade glasses, tortoise shell glasses, snake skin or plaited leather belts, flat caps, newsboy caps, bum bags, trilbys, and pork pie hats.

==== Formal business wear ====
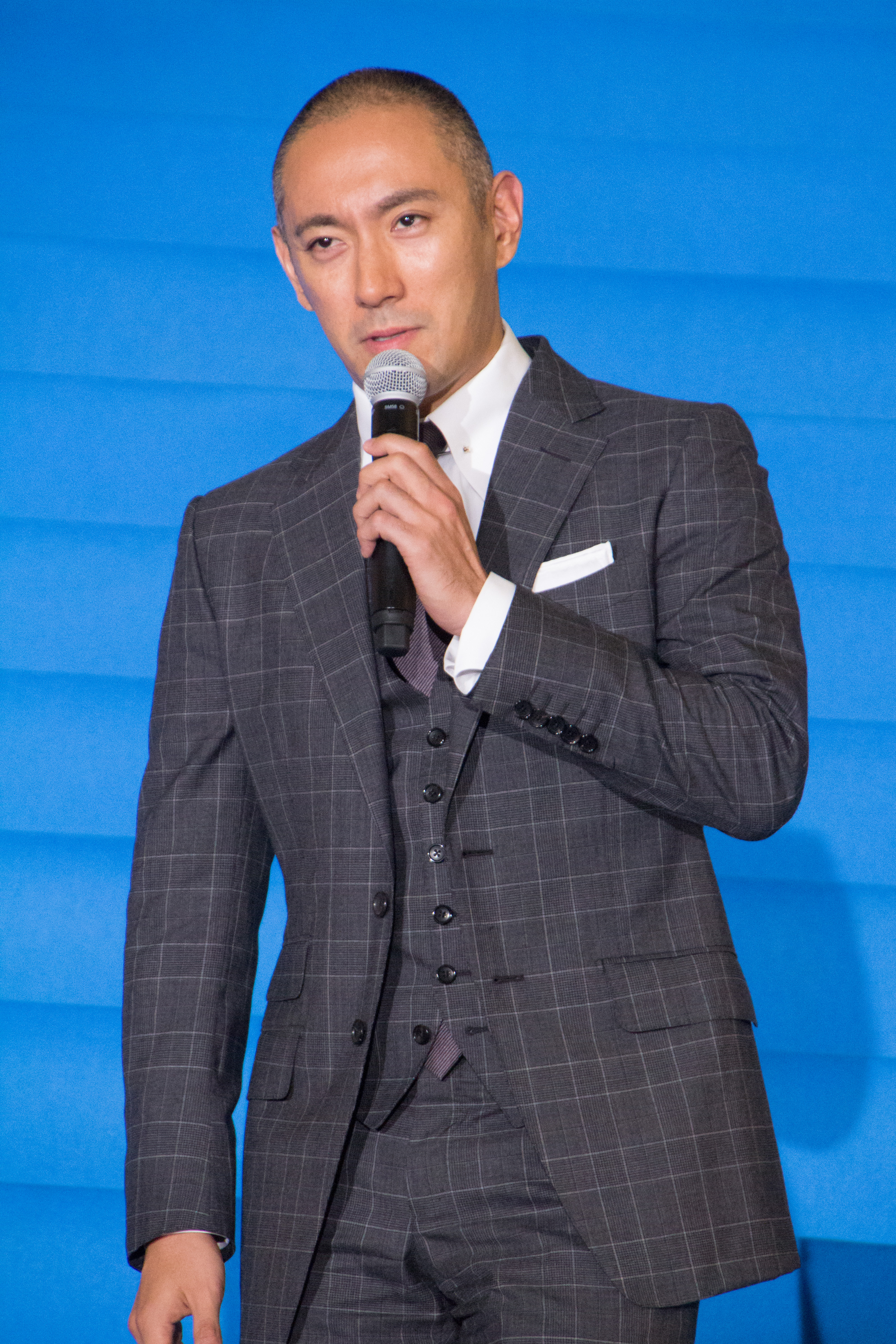
Japanese slim fitting three piece grey suit with window pane check, mid to late 2010s

In the UK, Italy, Australia and US, many professional men wear grey mohair or houndstooth office suits, usually with two-button fastening, a single vent, and narrow lapels inspired by the American TV show Mad Men, Hannibal, and Daniel Craig as James Bond. Businessmen in Asian countries like the Philippines generally followed the trend, but dispensed with the necktie in favor of a semi-formal, simple shirt better suited to the hot tropical climate. As part of the general 1980s revival, the waistcoat made a comeback as part of the three piece suit in Europe and the US. In the early 2010s these suits were mostly charcoal grey, shiny steel grey and silver (especially in Australia and America), but by 2014 these were joined by air force blue, navy blue, midnight blue, and sky blue.

In the UK, US and Germany, the suits of the mid-2010s often featured checks, houndstooth, Glen plaid, bird's eye, Prince of Wales plaid cloth, or windowpane tweed, and the stripes on pinstripe suits became narrower and more closely spaced. Popular footwear of spring 2016 included round toed Oxford shoes, loafers, and Chelsea boots. Thin ties remained the norm, but the simple notch lapels of 2010 were increasingly replaced by shawl collars and peak lapels on single breasted three piece suits. By 2016, the black and silver digital wristwatches of the early 2010s had gone out of style among professional men in favor of classic oversized analog wristwatches with round black, gold or white faces and traditional brown, tan or black leather straps.

Continuing on from the 2000s, fur ushanka and Astrakhan caps were often worn at wintertime formal occasions in Russia, Georgia, Kashmir, and Pakistan as both a symbol of national pride, and as a means of rejecting the excesses of Westernising globalization. In Afghanistan and Uzbekistan, however, the wearing of traditional dress such as the Astrakhan cap, kurta and pajama began to decline among professionals in favor of a Western style suit and tie, as part of a wider backlash against Hamid Karzai's regime.

==== African fashion ====
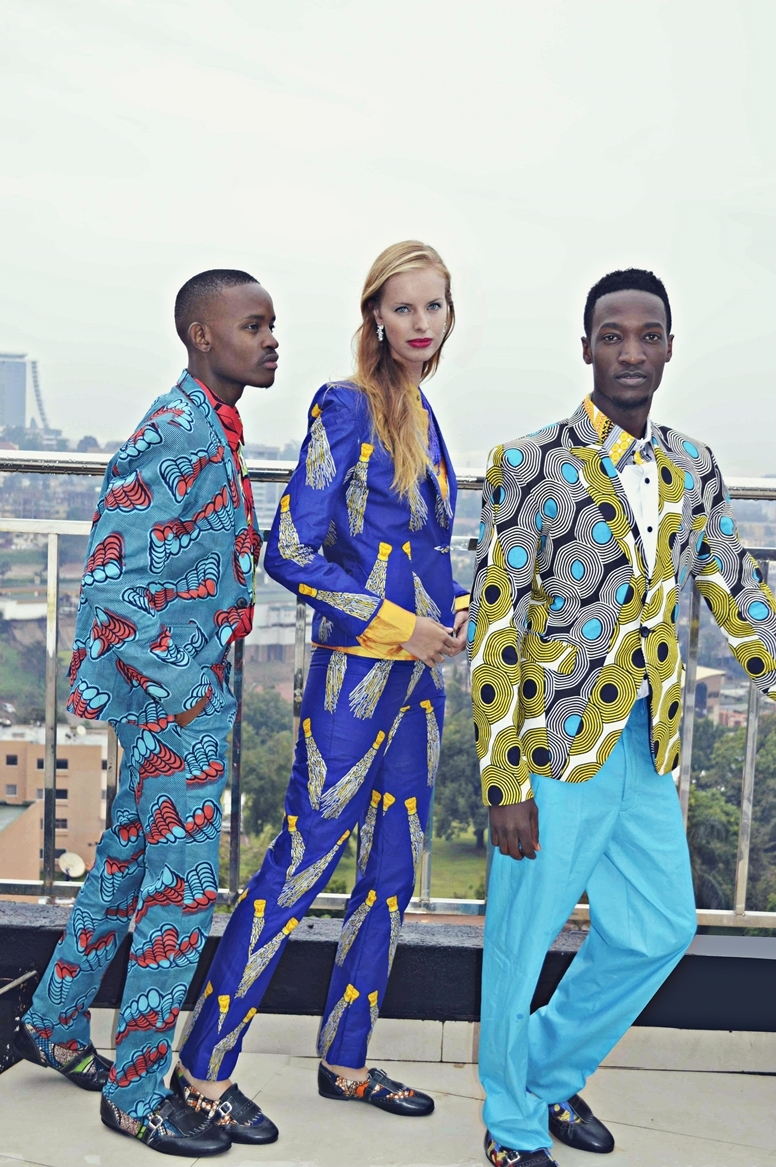
Mid 2010s Ugandan fashion

The mid-2010s witnessed the beginnings of Africa's own haute couture due to increased restriction on secondhand mitumba clothing in Kenya and Uganda. Mozambican designer Taibo Bacar was the first African fashion brand to debut at Milan Fashion Week in 2010 and became one of Africa's leading fashion houses, proving that African fashion can compete on the world stage.

Contemporary clothing in Africa is often cut to unisex Western patterns but uses indigenous fabric associated with folk costume, such as a sportcoat made from striped kikoy fabric, a shirt made from kente cloth, or the silk Madiba shirts popularised in South Africa by Nelson Mandela. At the same time, some aspects of traditional attire such as wooden jewelry or the Dashiki were worn by expatriate Africans in the West, African Americans, and some liberal white Americans.

In South Africa and the Congo, Dandies known as sapeurs and swenkas began imitating the wardrobes of the previous colonialist regime, by importing expensive modern three piece designer suits and customising them with vintage accessories such as the fedora, spats, bowtie and cane.

=== Late 2010s (2017–2019) ===
==== Relaxed look ====
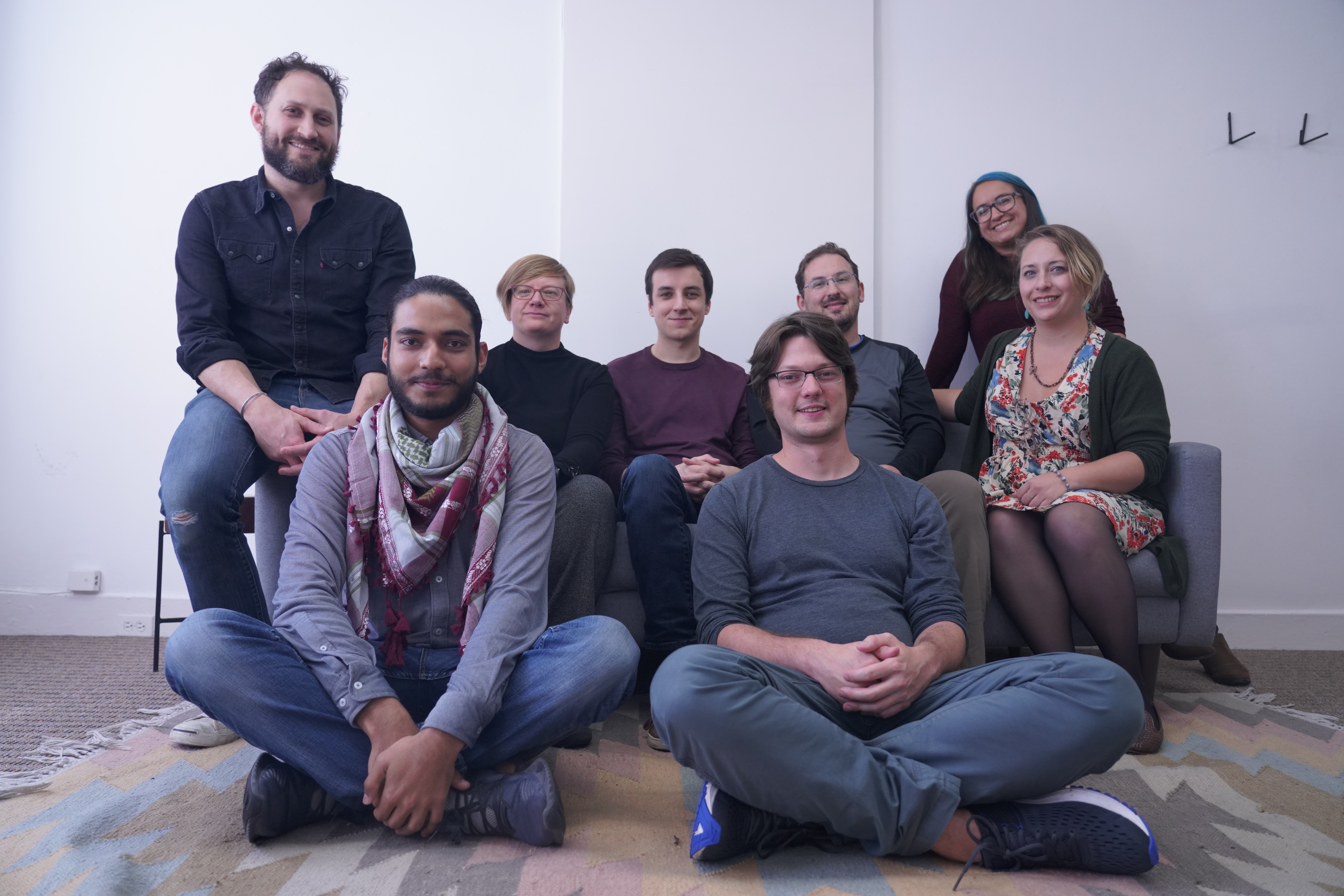
A Community Programs team wearing casual attire in 2019

By November 2018, fashion designers in the US and other countries began to move away from the slim fitting casual attire and frequently combined business casual pieces with sportswear. Brown replaced black as the most popular color for leather jackets, and common accessories included orange hoodies, black track pants, faded jeans covered in iron-on patches, black or white leather hi-tops, Timberland boots, navy blue wool coach jackets, graphic print tees featuring a small statement design, dark flannel sportcoats, cambric shackets, or camouflage jackets layered over cardigans or Alpine patterned sweaters, and white Adidas sneakers. From 2018 to 2020, baggy cargo pants with external pockets were reintroduced, skate shoes declined in popularity, and long tweed coats became popular.

In the American workplace, brown suits made a comeback, unstructured suits became popular in Britain as an alternative to the restrictive, slim fitting styles of the late 2000s. Wide neckties (frequently in patterned paisley silk, red and blue stripes, or knitted wool in black, tan or grey) replaced the thin styles of the mid-2000s, and polo shirts or turtlenecks became an acceptable substitute for dress shirts.

==== 1970s and Britpop influences ====
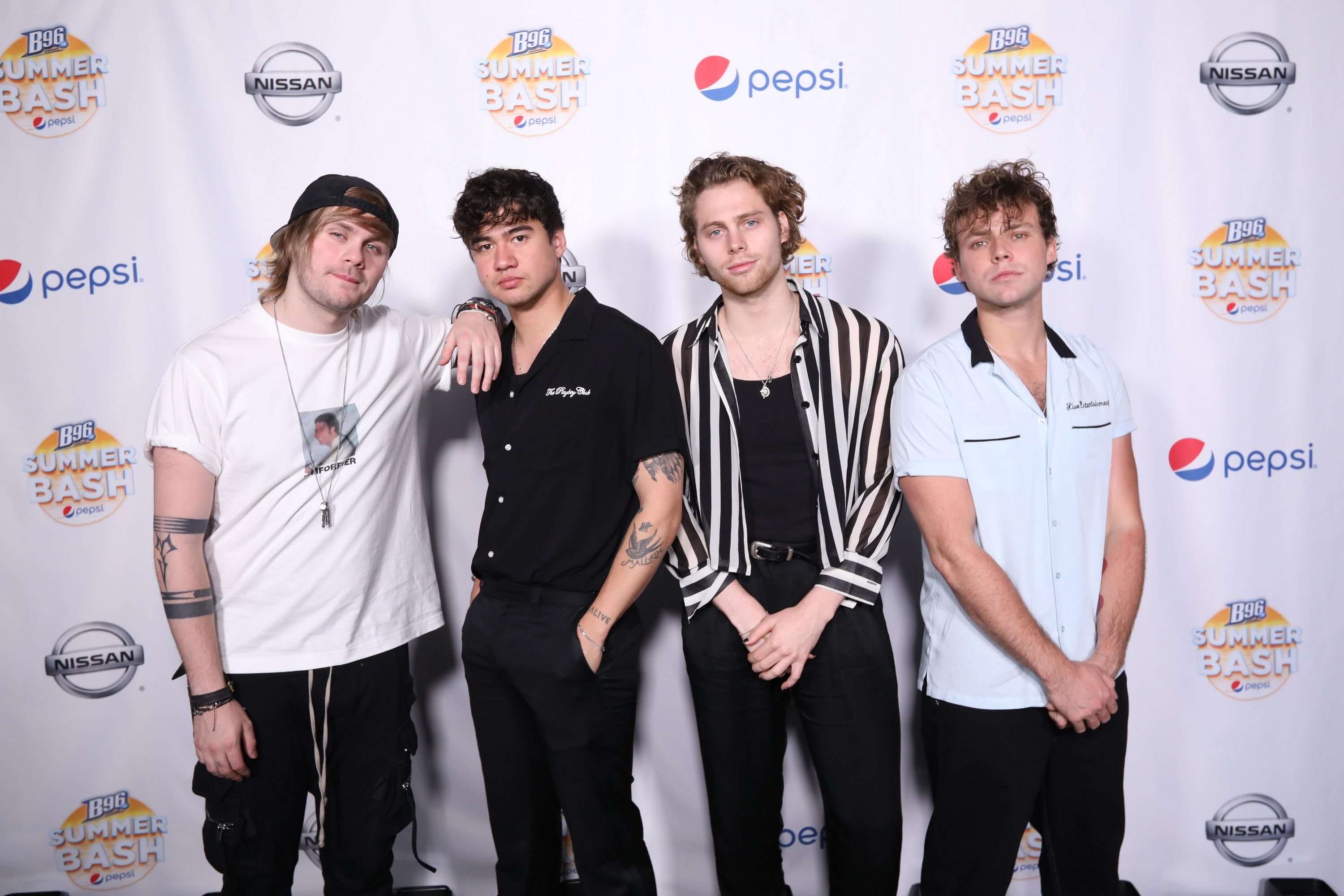
Typical late 2010s fashion of Australian band 5 Seconds of Summer in 2018

Beginning in March 2017, clothing inspired by 1990s Britpop, mod revival and 1970s fashion became popular among young men in the US, UK, Australia, Canada, Ireland, Italy, Hong Kong, and France, especially in beige, cream, sand, orange, blue, brown, dark green, ecru, red, pistachio, and complementary neutral tones. Desirable items included suede cowboy boots and winklepickers, stone grey suits with Teddy Boy inspired velvet shawl collars, retro black and red sneakers, Chelsea boots with contrasting red and blue elastic, striped dress shirts, sailor T shirts with vertical navy blue stripes, tropical print shirts, navy and red track jackets, two button cream trenchcoats, corduroy sportcoats worn with turtle neck sweaters, double breasted navy blue or herringbone tweed overcoats with shawl collars, six button polo shirts, natural suede chukka boots, sunflower print button-down shirts, white T-shirts with orange and blue color blocks, turquoise dip dye swimshorts, military chic parkas, wool overcoats, red Superdry parkas with fur hoods, navy blue straw trilby hats, short sleeved cardigans, red Doc Martens, houndstooth or Prince of Wales check sportcoats, pants with a contrasting red stripe, lightweight nautical inspired navy peacoats, embroidered silk souvenir jackets featuring birds, skulls, dragons or tigers, bomber jackets with orange linings, Converse modern sneakers in silver, red, royal blue, or green, muted Aloha shirts worn over plain T-shirts, brown flying jackets, corduroy pants, beige anoraks, pale denim slim-fit jeans and chinos, checked button down shirts in pink, blue, orange, red, and white with oversized Cuban collars, cropped black high waisted pants, Henley shirts, grey T-shirts, preppy striped polo shirts with wider collars, double strap combat boots, claret, teal, electric blue, or navy blue velvet tuxedo jackets, and psychedelic floral print shirts frequently worn tucked into the pants.

== Youth fashion and subcultures ==
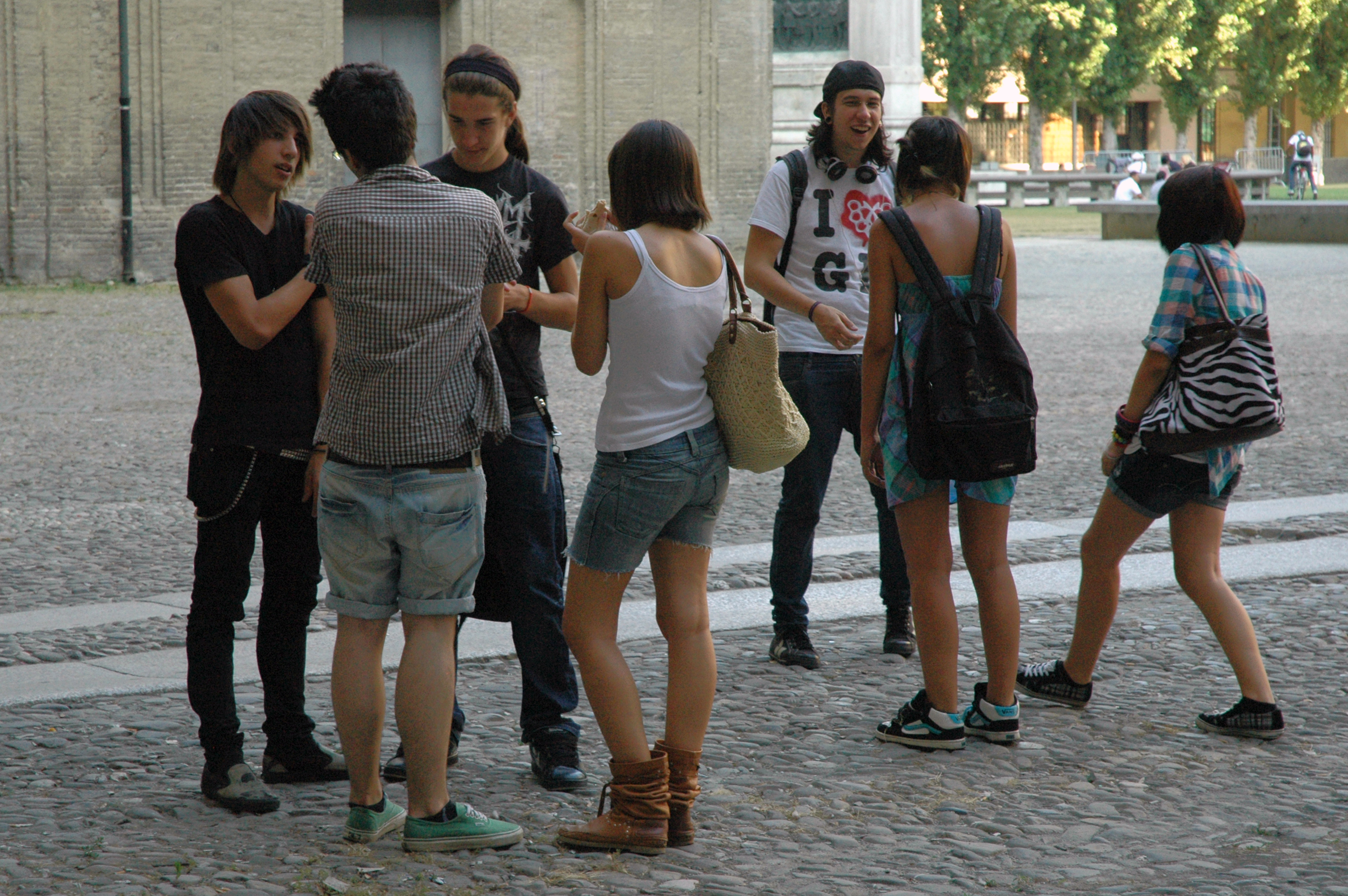
Teenagers in Italy wearing graphic tees, plaid shirts, cutoff shorts, and studded accessories popular early in the decade, 2010.

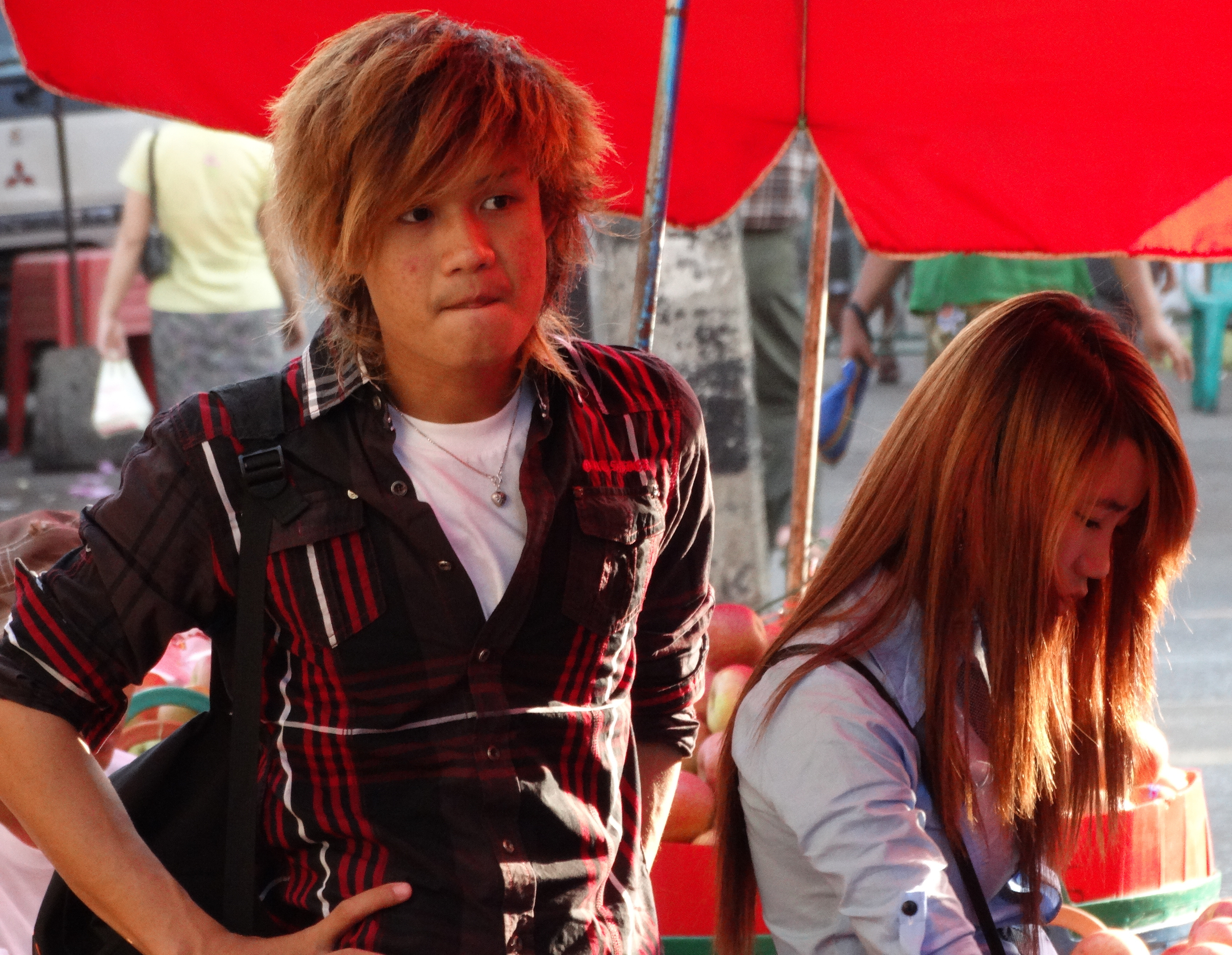
Teenagers in Yangon, Myanmar with trendy, dyed haircuts and slim fit, layered silhouettes inspired by East Asian and American trends, 2014.

=== General trends ===
While elements of youth subcultures heavily influenced mainstream fashion during raw 2010s, particularly among young adults, adolescent fashion still retained distinct characteristics. Fads such as shutter shades, snapback hats, and Silly Bandz reflected a playful or exaggerated aesthetic less commonly adopted by older age groups. The fashion choices of pop culture figures, such as celebrities and social media influencers also played a notable role in shaping teen specific trends.

=== Hipsters and twee ===
By the early 2010s, British, American, and Filipino indie clothing had moved away from the bright colors and overt 1960s styling of the mid-2000s in favor of a more "grown up" intellectual look, with 1990s style earth-tones like grey, burgundy, brown, teal, and beige. Tweed jackets, skinny chino trousers, dress boots, 2fer and layered shirts and tees, cardigan sweaters, nerdy horn-rimmed glasses, sweaters, thick wool socks, worker boots, leggings, and beanies replaced the winklepickers, velvet jackets, Aviator sunglasses, and skinny ties typically worn by indie rock bands, although vintage Western shirts, leather jackets, military dress uniforms, homemade jewelry, and thrift store chic plaid shirts remained popular in Europe. Drop crotch pants, designed by the Danish brand Humör, became more and more popular in Europe amongst hipsters and hip hop fans, who replaced their skinny jeans and carpenter jeans with "old school but modern" style.

American Apparel made normcore a prominent aspect of hipster culture in the US from 2016 onwards. The look is based on modern business casual wear, everyday casual attire worn by older men, and the geek chic clothing worn by stereotypical nerds during the 1980s. Popular accessories include horn rimmed glasses, high waisted pants especially pleated khaki chinos, dad hats, zip up polar fleeces, white or blue button down shirts, socks with sandals, turtlenecks, white tennis shoes, pocket protectors, leather shoes, plain sweaters in muted colors, and, for women, "mom jeans". The fanny pack accessory made a late comeback in 2018 with new packs introduced by fashion designers Gucci, Prada, and Louis Vuitton. Reasons for the "belt bag" being in vogue was attributed to changing lifestyle needs that made categories like luggage, backpacks and even fanny packs popular items on shopping and wish-lists during the 2018 holiday season, along with a persisting taste for throwback fashion, particularly 1980s nostalgia.

=== Classic preppy ===
During the early 2010s, American preppy guys moved away from the hip-hop influenced fashions of the 2000s and begun to dress in a more classic 1950s Ivy League style with sweaters, Sperry Top-Sider boat shoes, Aran sweaters, cardigans, Oxford shirts, Cricket pullovers, wingtips, stripy polo shirts with layered shirts underneath in cooler weather, hats like the fedora, khaki or pastel colored Vineyard Vines, Nantucket Reds, white or bright pastel color socks worn with sneakers and Sperry Top-Sider boat shoes, white casual sneakers especially from Vans and Sperrys brands, colored jeans, white Nike Elite crew socks, baseball jackets, and khaki shorts. From the mid-2010s on, khaki shorts with shorter 7, 6, and 5 inch inseams, jogger pants, and tapered chinos became popular for guys.

From 2012 onwards, seersucker blazers and pants made a comeback among young American men due to a resurgence of interest in classic preppy clothing and the 1920s fashion showcased in The Great Gatsby. Although pale blue and dark blue stripes remained the most popular choice, alternative colors included green, red and brown. The traditional two button blazer was updated with a slimmer cut and Edwardian inspired lapel piping, and double breasted jackets became available during the mid-2010s. Outside of the US, the Australian Olympic team received green and white candy stripe blazers for the 2016 Olympics and Toms shoes rather than the traditional dark green jackets with gold trim.

Throughout the 2010s, Preppy girls wore flip flops, ballet flats, Keds worn in ads by Mischa Barton, Ariana Grande and Taylor Swift, Sperry Top-Sider boat shoes, white casual Sperry sneakers, flat ankle boots with tights or crew or knee socks slouched down over tights, leggings, jeggings or skinny jeans, layered shirts and tees, cold shoulder tops, capri pants, ankle length pants, colored jeans, opaque or footless tights, tweed cloth or plaid skirts, skater dresses, skater skirts, baby doll dresses, cotton shorts in pastel colors, romper dress or romper with shorts, Uggs, Hunter boots brand rain boots, leg warmers, jogger pants, white or pastel colored skinny jeans, high waisted jeans, "mom" jeans worn with shirt or sweater tucked in and a belt, stacked waist denim, shortalls, railroad stripe blouses, knee socks, flat knee high riding boots with knee socks visible at top, flat ankle boots with visible slouched knee socks, jeggings, capri or ankle length leggings worn with shorts, dresses and skirts, oversized sweaters, bike shorts with or without lace trim worn with long shirts or under shorter skirts or dresses, 3/4 length sleeved shirts, tees and polos layered with a long sleeved shirt in cooler weather, Nike Tempo shorts, Nike Elite crew socks, and crew neck sweatshirts bearing the name and crest of the school or college. The British equivalent of preppies, known as Sloane rangers, dressed similarly, by combining traditional British upper class fashions such as tweed cloth sportcoats, white pants, jodhpurs, barbour jackets, practical knitwear, Chanel clothing, or strings of pearls with androgynous and revealing tailoring inspired by reality TV stars and supermodels like Cara Delevingne, including PVC skirts, lace blouses, designer brand sneakers, or cropped blue and white cardigans that exposed the stomach.

=== Scene kids ===
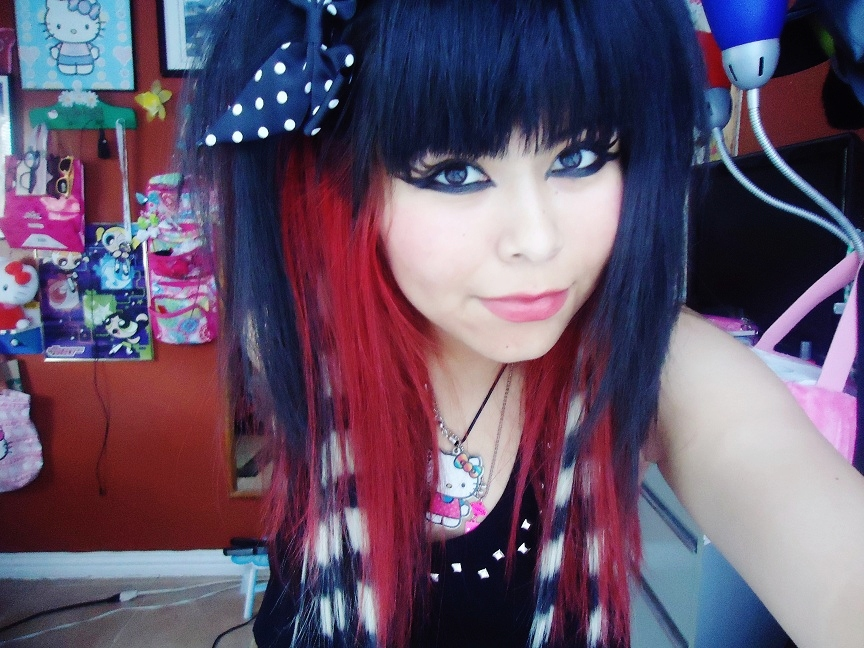
A teenage American scene girl in 2011, wearing raccoon-striped hair extensions, heavy eyeliner, and colorful accessories typical of the style.

From 2010 to 2014, the androgynous scene subculture remained common in the West Coast United States, Europe, Australasia, parts of Asia, and South America, especially in the Brazilian city of Fortaleza. Closely related regional subcultures included Shamate in China and Coloridos in Brazil, both of which shared visual similarities with scene fashion.

Scene fashion drew influence from emo, hip hop, Japanese street style, and indie pop aesthetics. Typical outfits featured brightly colored skinny jeans, trucker hats, zip-up hoodies, studded or pyramid belts, and skate shoes such as Vans or Converse. Tightly fitted T-shirts were ubiquitous, often with pop art designs or branded band merchandise for groups such as Asking Alexandria, Blood on the Dance Floor and Bring Me the Horizon. Accessories often included large hair bows, tiaras, plastic jewelry, and cartoon-themed backpacks or bags. Hairstyles were a defining feature, frequently involving voluminous, teased layers with side-swept bangs, multicolored extensions, and distinctive raccoon-striping.

By the end of 2013, many scene kids had abandoned the cartoon print hoodies, and neon colors in favor of a more hardcore/skate punk look with single color dyed hair often in black, teal, or red, A-shirts, flannel shirts, combat boots, and stretched earlobe piercings.

=== Skater and sneakerhead fashion ===
In the Americas, Britain, Australia, Ethiopia and the Philippines, many skaters wore designer streetwear such as joggers, hoodies, backwards baseball caps, and tracksuits in addition to the typical plaid shirts, ripped jeans and trucker hats. Common brands from 2012 to 2015 included Diamond Supply Co., Hollister, The Hundreds, OBEY bar logo T-shirts and snapback hats, Vans, Converse All Stars, cannabis, camouflage or foliage print shirts, Levi's jeans, Nike, LRG, DGK, Adidas Skateboarding and Originals apparel and shoes, and T-shirts featuring the Santa Cruz Skateboards screaming hand, eyeball, "cartoon grotesque" faces, Black Madonna, or Slasher cartoon character.

In the Americas, Malaysia, India, and China, an offshoot of the skater subculture, known as "sneakerheads", dress similarly. Common mid-2010s sneakerhead apparel includes Nike Air Jordans, Air Yeezys, Converse Moderns, Nike SBs, DC Spartans, Supra Sky-Tops, Vans, designer sportswear, True Religion slim fit jeans, backwards baseball caps, red high-tops with fluorescent or reflective white stars, Skullcandy headphones, leggings, slouched crew socks, and Keds (for girls), Aviator sunglasses, waffle plaid shirts, throwback basketball singlets, tracksuits, Nike Elite socks, cosmic print T-shirts, hoodies, and Nixon watches. As of 2016, the most desirable colors for sneakers and apparel were black, red and white due to their longstanding association with late 1980s new wave music, the Michael Jordan era of basketball, and old school hip-hop.

=== Seapunks and steampunks ===
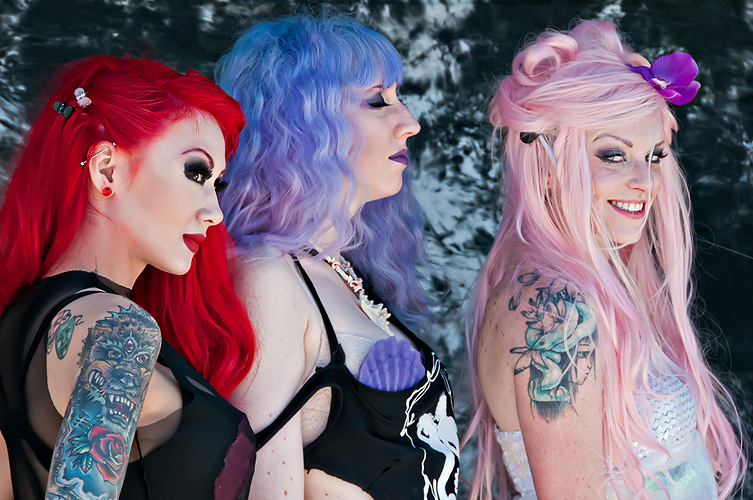
Three girls with multicolored seapunk inspired hair

Seapunk, a fusion of scene, electronic dance music and hipster culture, began as an online internet meme before becoming a niche street fashion in Germany, Brazil and America. This movement influenced several mainstream pop and hip-hop artists during the mid-2010s, most notably Azealia Banks, Frank Ocean, and Rihanna. Seapunks often combined brightly dyed androgynous hairstyles with nautical themes such as mermaids or dolphins, plastic Ray Ban wayfarers, undercut hairstyles, merman hair and beards dyed blue, shell jewelry, feathers, tartan overshirts associated with the surfer subculture, 1990s inspired yin-yang T-shirts, baseball caps, tie dye, transparent plastic jackets, much green, light blue, turquoise, cyan or aquamarine clothing, smiley motifs, and red and blue 3-Dimensional images.

In the Americas, Australia and Japan, steampunk gained regional popularity among some young people aged 18–25. From 2011 to 2015, members of this subculture often combined Neo-Victorian and Elegant Gothic aristocrat clothing such as top hats, pocket watches, or (for girls) corsets, velvet or brocade dresses, brooches, and black, dark red or brown leather waistcoats, with bowties, hipster inspired beards and tweed clothing, jewelry made from brass gears, dark skinny jeans, worker boots, and flying goggles. American and Asian Steampunks sometimes incorporate pirate shirts or petticoats borrowed from fantasy or Ren-Fair LARP, and elements of Japanese street style such as Gothic Lolita inspired short skirts, traditional silk kimonos, or parasols.

=== Hip-hop ===
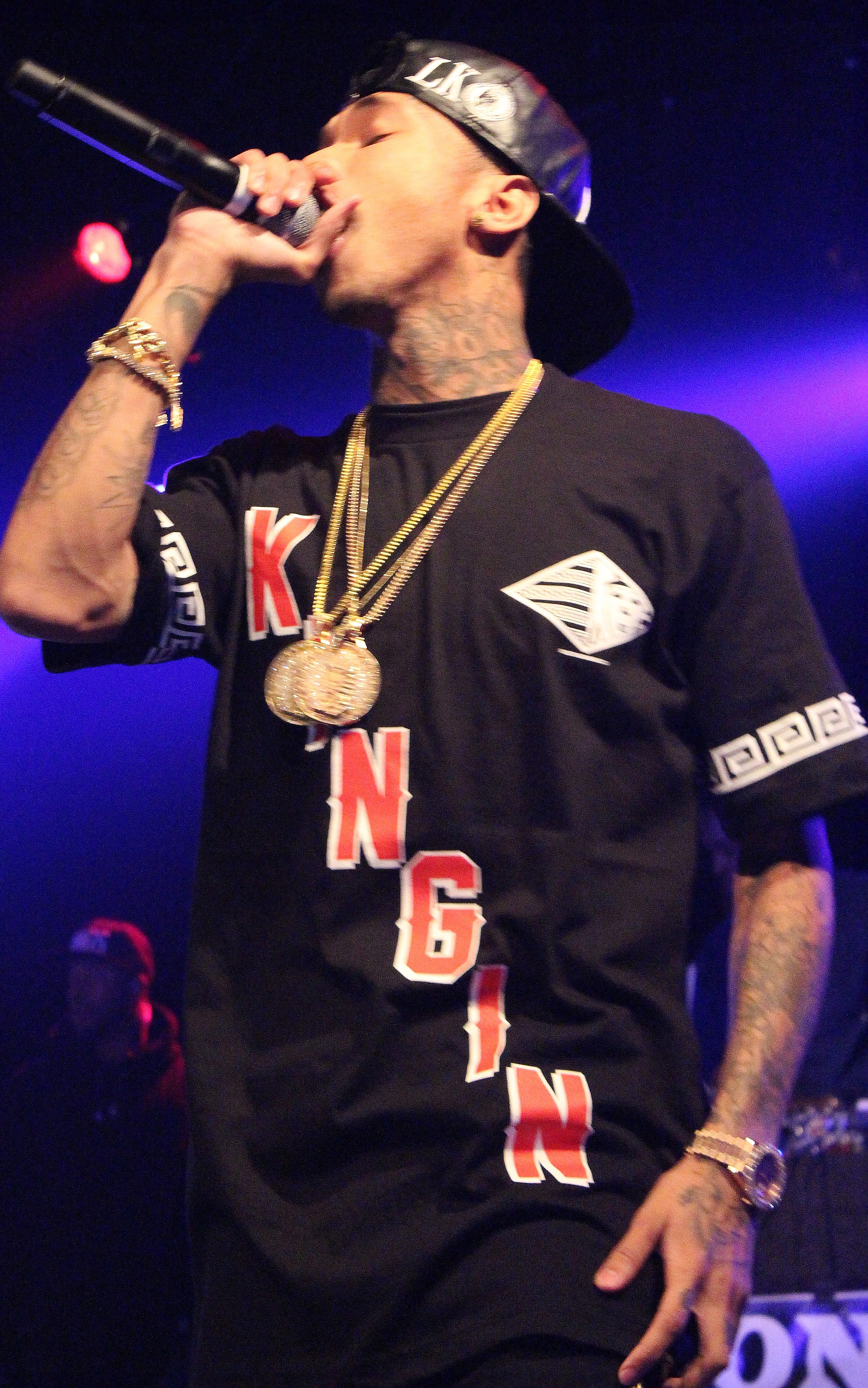
American rapper Tyga in 2013

Hip hop fans wear tactical pants, Nike sneakers and apparel, Air Jordans, Ralph Lauren Polo Boots, strapback caps, Obey and Diamond Supply Co. T-shirts, Mitchell & Ness retro snapbacks, True Religion jeans, and goggle jackets. Retro retro 1990s fashions like snapbacks, skinny acid-wash jeans, bucket hats, Retro curved peak mid-late 1990s inspired strapback caps (commonly known as "Dad Hats"), baseball jackets, nylon tracksuits, varsity jackets, Vans, Chuck Taylors, rain boots, retro Nikes, Shell tube socks, leather jackets, Levis, Adidas and Nike apparel, gold chains, Ray Ban sunglasses, Air Jordans, and oversized sweaters, and colors such as red, green, and yellow, made a comeback in the African American community due to the influence of drum and bass, rave music, and indie pop-inspired rappers. Independent brands have risen to popularity, as well as floral print items and tie-dye items. Timberlands are particularly popular in New York as a fashionable and durable shoe. By the 2010s, the boots' popularity is mainstream, and a staple in the fall and winter months. Controversially, high fashion magazines including Vogue and Elle have credited models rather than rappers with making Timberlands fashionable.

Fashion designers such as Riccardo Tisci and Rick Owens begin to gain a new popularity within hip hop, popularized by rappers such as Kanye West and A$AP Rocky. Such designers inspire a "darker" aesthetic involving monochromatic colour schemes (usually black or grey), extra-long shirts usually sporting oversized neck openings and asymmetrical hems, skinny jeans that are worn with long inseams and an aggressive taper to cause bunching up or "stacks" near the ankle (a style heavily popularized and sported by Kanye) and high-top sneakers. Black boots, leather jackets, denim vests, bombers, monochrome sports jerseys, waxed jeans, black varsity jackets, tapered sweatpants, drop-crotch trousers, layering shorts over leggings and occasionally floral print are all popular trends within this style as well. Other notable rappers that sport this look include Kendrick Lamar, Danny Brown, and Pusha T.

In the mid-2010s, dashikis became trendy in hip hop and afro-punk fashion, shown on celebrities like Beyoncé, Rihanna, Schoolboy Q, Zendaya Coleman, and Chris Brown.

Skater culture is also heavily prominent in hip hop fashion, largely attributed to alternative rapper Tyler the Creator and his group OFWGKTA. Models of shoes from Vans – such as the authentics, slip-ons, sk8-his, era, and "old skool" – were popularized in the hip hop community by him and Kanye West. Brands such as Supreme, Obey, merchandise from Odd Future, Tyler, the Creator's Golf Wang clothing line, HUF, and the apparel of skate magazine Thrasher are popular in hip hop and street style.

With the rise of alternative hip-hop subcultures, such as Cloud Rap and Emo Rap in the late 2010s, "sad boy" culture became prominent. It typically consists of teen guys, wearing bucket hats, skinny jeans and black and white clothes with colorful computer aesthetics, Japanese lettering, or sad faces. Many features of this fashion come from the emo subculture of the previous decade.

=== Cholo and chicano ===
In Mexico and the Southwestern US during the early 2010s, many members of the cholo, chicano and lowrider subcultures combine hip-hop fashion with Western shirts, traditional charro jackets, Stetson hats, skinny jeans, and Cowboy boots with elongated toes. These 3 ft long "Mexican pointy boots," associated with Tribal-guarachero music are an extreme version of the '60s-inspired Winklepickers popular in mid-2000s Britain.

By 2015, many young chicanos on the American West Coast had abandoned the garish Western inspired clubwear in favor of a more authentic 1950s inspired look. Pachuco style Zoot suits, fedoras and panama hats made a comeback, together with more typical casual rockabilly fashions for everyday wear such as slim jeans, black leather jackets, bowling shirts, brightly colored blouses and flouncy skirts for girls, polka dot dresses with petticoats, and flowers worn in the hair.

=== K-pop ===
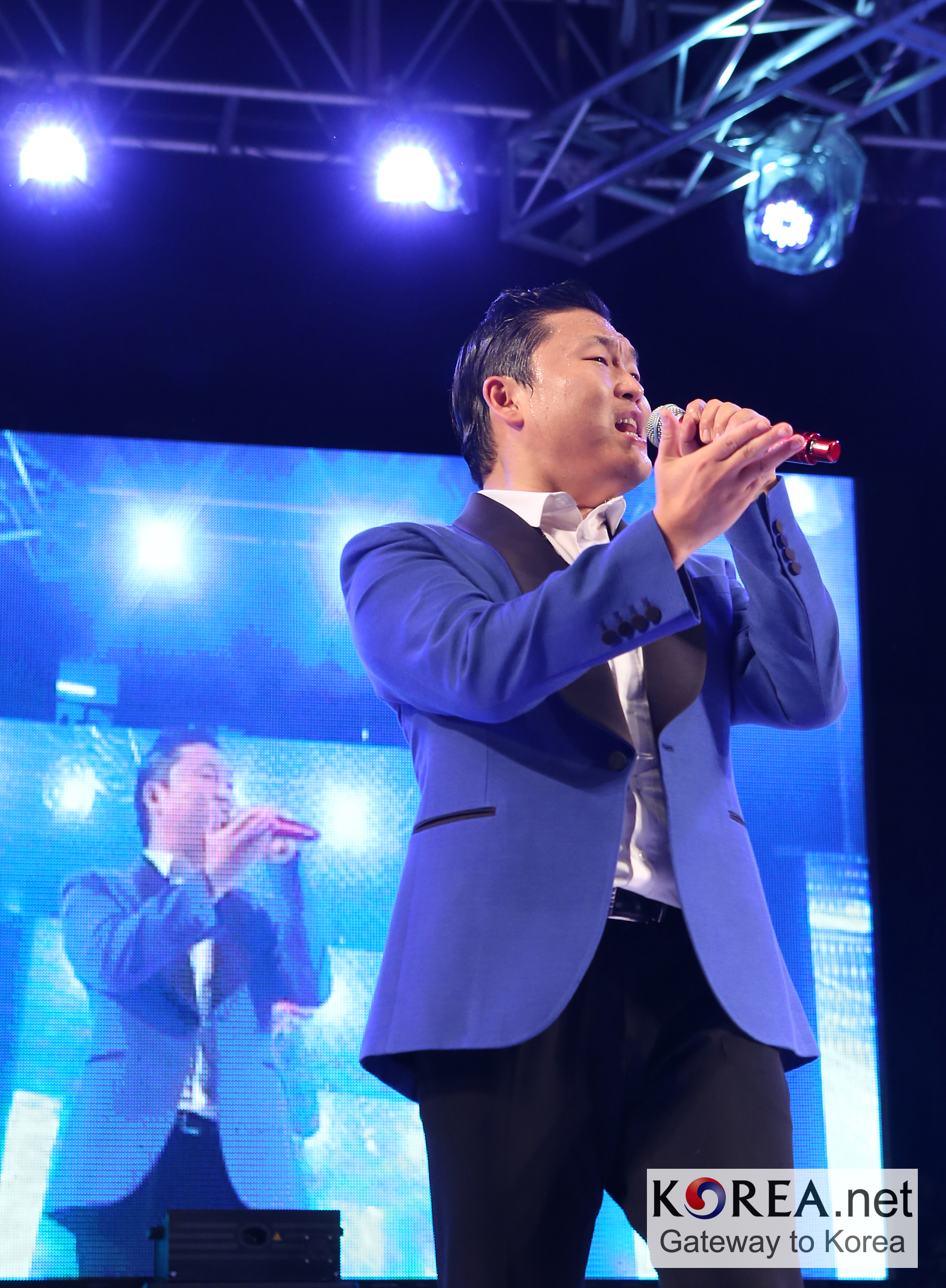
K-Pop singer Psy

Due to the spread of the Korean Wave worldwide, millions of Asian and Asian-American youths have become consumers of K-Pop. These are the people who love listening to South Korean music and follow the style of artists and pop groups like Big Bang, Wonder Girls, Girls' Generation, or Gangnam Style singer, Psy. Since the Korean girl and boy bands wore extravagant clothing, some of the hardcore fans in China, Korea, America and South-east Asian countries like the Philippines tried to copy their idols and started wearing K-Pop style hairstyles and clothing. These included skull, floral or honeycomb prints, monochromatic shirts, silk jackets featuring stylized Asian art prints or pop art, leather skirts, black and neon printed leggings, retro joggers, short shorts, black and gold jewelry, brightly colored tuxedo jackets, tracksuits, basketball shirts, leather caps, and sequined or glitter jackets.

=== Jejemon ===
During the early part of the 2010s, a new youth subculture called Jejemon arose in the Philippines, sparking a brief moral panic among some older conservatives and other youths. The Philippine Daily Inquirer describes Jejemons as a "new breed of hipster who have developed not only their own language and written text but also their own subculture and fashion. These predominantly working class youths are associated with wearing trucker hats and use their own language through texting and via social media such as Facebook. They are often criticized by others for not using the words properly; even the Department of Education discouraged use of the Jejemon language. Apart from the language, the Jejemons were also criticized for their fashion and manners. From early 2013 onwards, with the rise of smartphones which began to overtake feature phones in terms of sales in the country, the phenomenon seems to have made a gradual decline in mainstream popularity. For the remaining years of the decade, it would drop its text messaging-centered aspect in social media and now refers to the rap-centered subculture who usually wear counterfeit hip-hop clothing.

=== E-kids and VSCO Kids ===
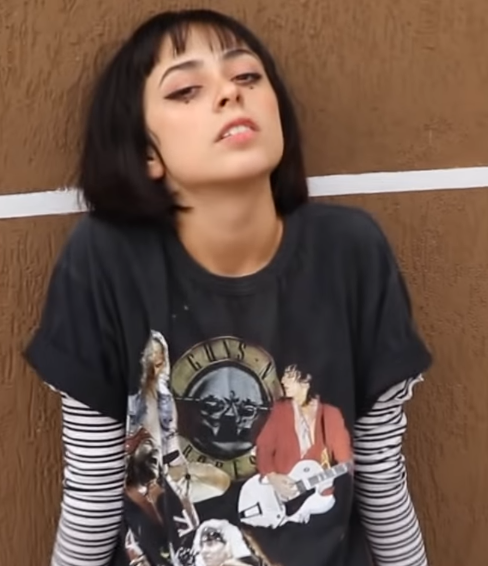
An example of an e-girl's aesthetic

From 2018 to 2020s, internet memes influenced fashion and subcultures began to emerge among teenagers and youth in the US, popularized by social media apps such as VSCO and TikTok.

VSCO girls wore either no makeup or little makeup that blended with their skin and prioritized a cute and comfortable style. Clothing and accessories associated with the VSCO aesthetic included scrunchies often worn on the wrist, headbands, high-waisted pants, oversized T-shirt dresses from Nike or Brandy Melville, denim shorts or baggy jeans, a Fjallraven backpack, a puka shell necklace, and bike shorts from Nike. Footwear included dirty white sneakers, checkered Vans, ballet flats, Birkenstock sandals, and Crocs decorated with pins. Colors were soft and muted to match the VSCO app's color scheme. Environmental concerns, particularly sea turtle conservation, were commonly associated with the VSCO aesthetic. Due to mockery and overexposure on TikTok, the term VSCO girl quickly became phased out of popular culture.

E-kids' fashion is described as being inspired by skater culture, 1990s fashion, anime, hip-hop, kpop, emo rap, and trap metal. It has been labeled both "moodier VSCO" and a "hypersexualized child aesthetic". The E-kids aesthetic emphasized intricate makeup design, including layered pink blush on the cheeks and nose, fake freckles, blocky eyebrows, heavy winged eyeliner, hearts or stars drawn under the eyes, and rounded lips, as well as frequently changing hair color, with popular color choices being lime green, pink, or half-white and half-black, often put in pigtails. Key clothing and accessories choices included mesh T-shirts, colorful hair clips, black-and-white striped mock necks, checkered print, silver chains, O-ring collars, beanies, mini plaid skirts, high-waisted cargo pants, and cropped T-shirts layered over long-sleeve shirts. Footwear included chunky heels, sneakers, and Vans. E-kids were said to only exist on the internet and therefore live a double life.

== Children's clothing ==
=== New influences ===
The decade saw the rise of child influencers with parents posting pictures of young children using sponsored products such as clothing online. The birth of a new generation of the British royal family from 2013 also impacted children's fashion, with sales of garments often sharply increasing if the royal children had been pictured wearing them. Other high-profile children were also known to have an effect on the fashion industry.

== Hairstyles ==
=== Women ===
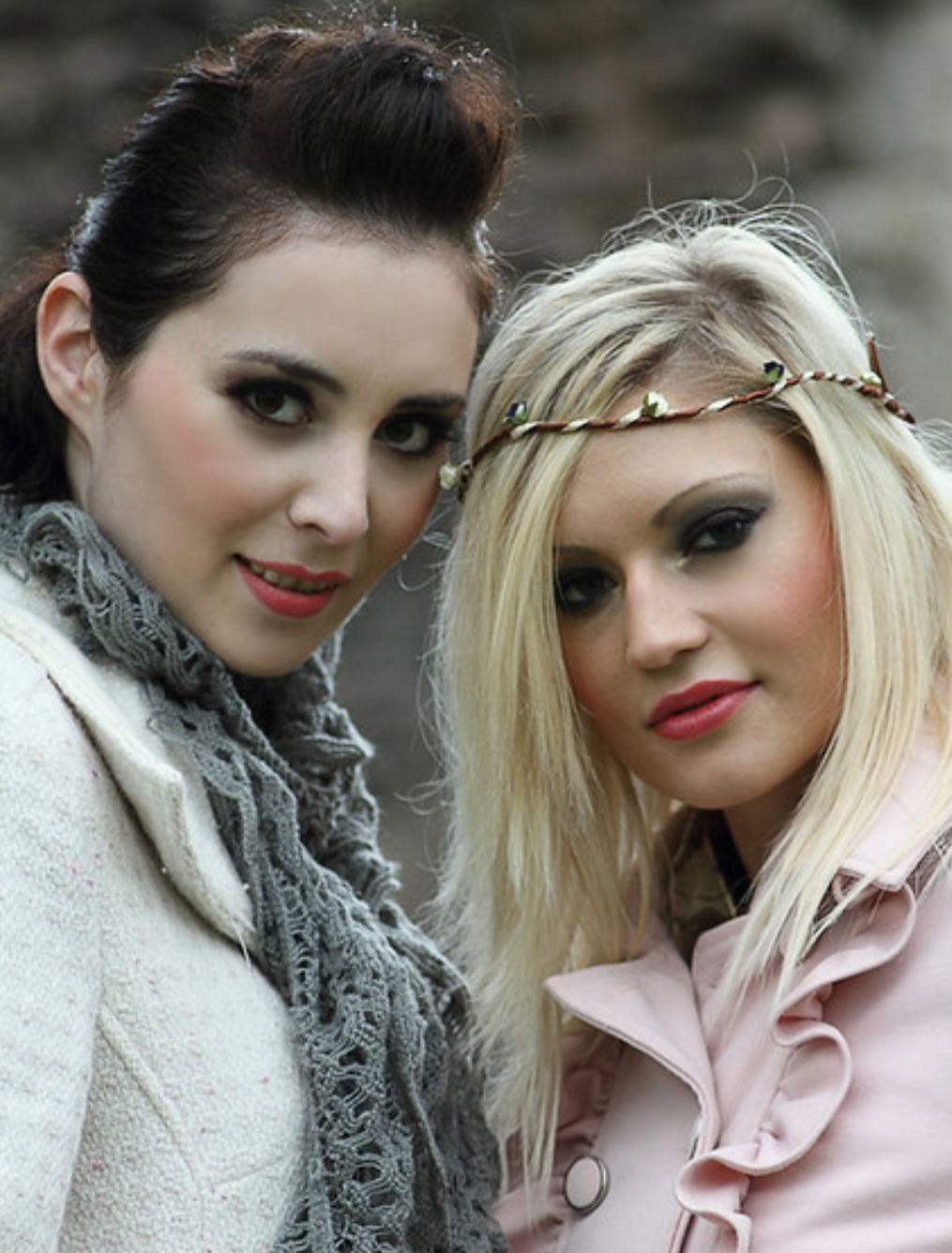
Two women in England, the woman on the left wears a pompadour, while the woman on the right sports side-parted blonde hair with a boho-style headband, 2011.

Throughout the 2010s, women’s hair trends shifted from the flat-ironed, side-parted, and often teased styles of the early decade toward softer, more natural textures and center parts. Midway through the decade, beachy waves became dominant, eventually giving way to sleeker, straight styles by 2019.

==== Early 2010s (2010–2013) ====
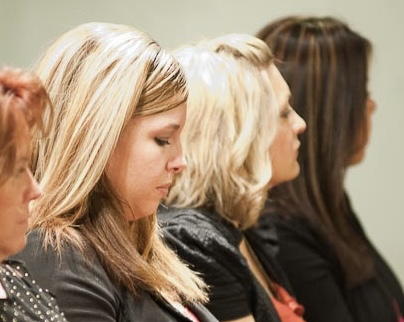
American women with popular early 2010s hairstyles, including chunky highlights, flat-ironed layers, and deep side parts with crown volume, 2012.

===== Straight hair and side fringe =====
In the early 2010s, many women, particularly in Europe and East Asia, continued to favor long, flat-ironed hair with natural tones, a holdover from the mid-2000s. Hair extensions remained common for adding volume or length, particularly in American pop culture. Styles were typically worn side-parted, often with side-fringe. These long, angled, scene-inspired fringes were often flat-ironed and paired with layers or choppy cuts. Blunt-cut bangs also saw renewed popularity, often worn straight across the forehead in styles inspired by retro aesthetics and frequently associated with celebrities such as Zooey Deschanel.

===== Poufs and teased hair =====
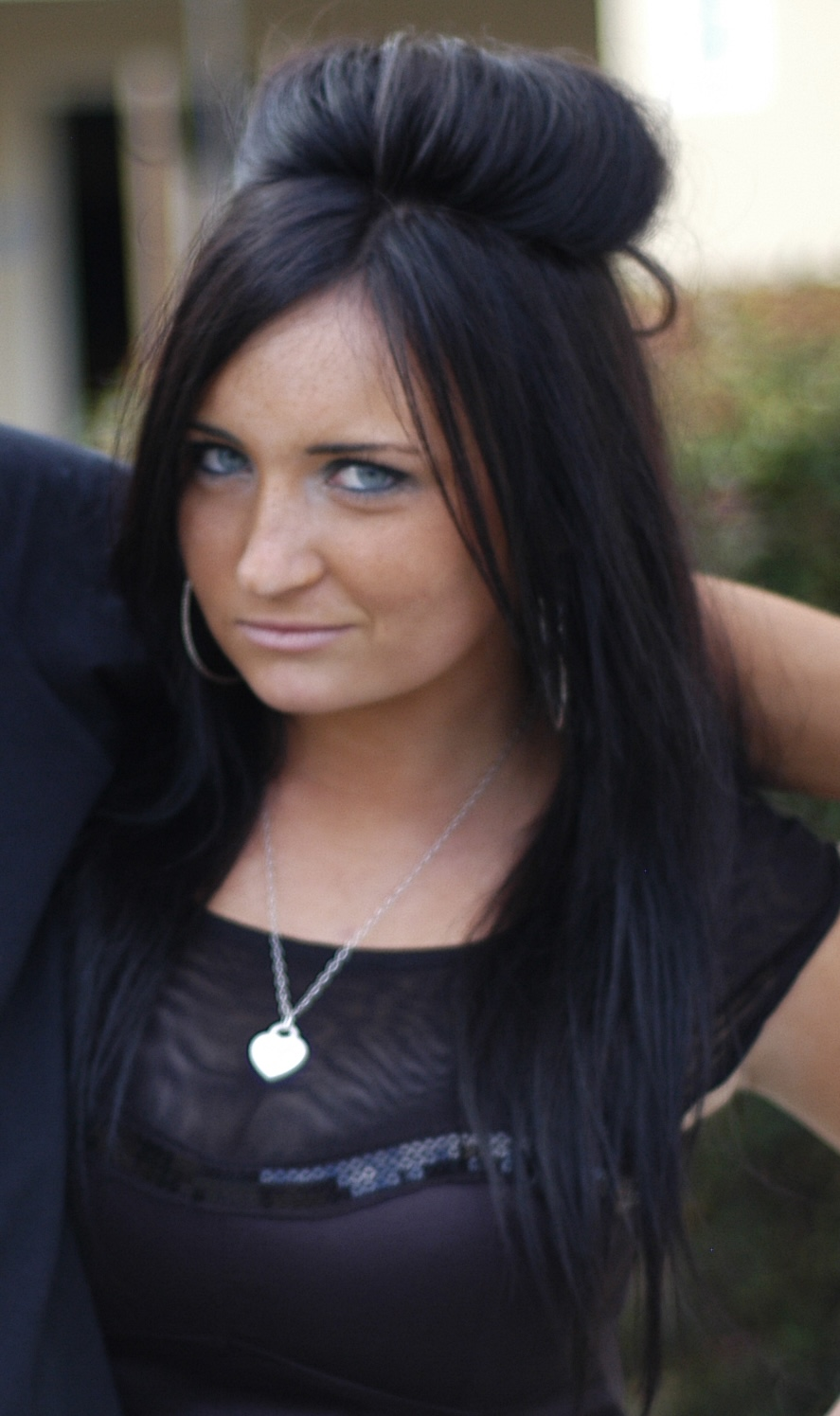
The signature early 2010s “pouf” hairstyle, featuring teased crown volume and long, straightened hair inspired by Snooki from MTV’s Jersey Shore, 2010.

A brief revival of height-focused styles also defined the start of the decade. The most iconic was the “pouf” or “bump”, a volumized crown created with teasing or volumizing inserts such as Bumpits, popularized by Snooki of MTV’s Jersey Shore. Other high-volume styles included sock buns, top knots, and high ponytails.

===== Crimped, curled, and ombré styles. =====
Crimped and curled textures had a brief resurgence among teens in the US. By 2013, shorter haircuts like the bob, pixie, crop, and undercut were on the rise across Europe and North America. Meanwhile, ombré dyeing surged in popularity, featuring a gradient from dark roots to lighter ends, slowly replacing the chunky highlights that had carried over from the previous decade.

==== Mid 2010s (2014–2016) ====
===== Beachy waves =====
Loose, tousled beach waves became the defining Western hairstyle during the mid-2010s. Often worn blonde, the look became ubiquitous with Instagram and was associated with celebrities such as Blake Lively. The loose waves were typically created using curling wands or salt spray.

===== Boho braids and buns =====
In the mid-2010s, intricate braid styles hit their peak, with crown braids, fishtails, halo braids, and Dutch braids inspired by the Hunger Games' Katniss Everdeen becoming mainstays at festivals and weddings. Messy top knots and high buns also remained fashionable, especially when worn loose or with face-framing strands.

===== Natural hair and protective styles =====
The natural hair movement gained widespread momentum from 2012 to 2016. African-American, Black Canadian, and Afro-Caribbean British women increasingly embraced natural afro-textured hair through twist-outs, afros, and dreadlocks, moving away from chemical straightening. Box braids, Fulani braids, and cornrows surged in popularity partially due to their adoption by celebrities like Zoë Kravitz and Beyoncé. By 2016, the adoption of cornrows (“boxer braids”) by some white women sparked debates over cultural appropriation.

==== Late 2010s (2017–2019) ====
===== Middle parts and bone straight hair =====
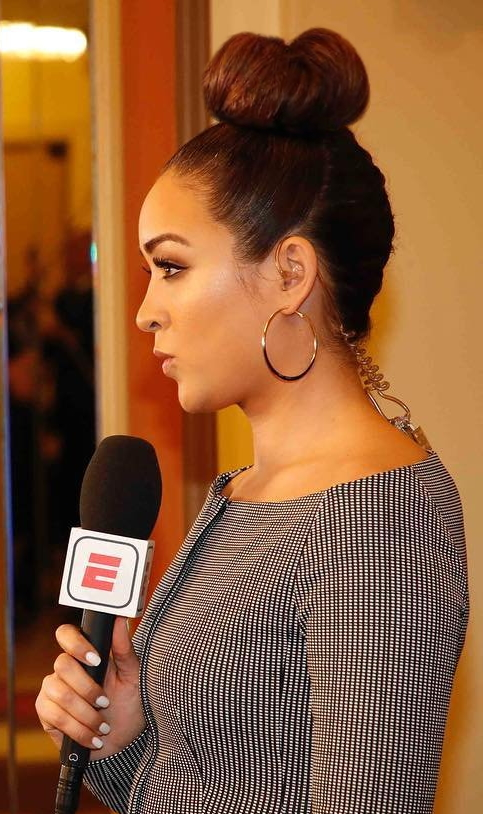
TV anchor Cassidy Hubbarth wearing a high sock bun in 2018.

By the end of the decade, sleek, bone-straight hair regained dominance, often styled with center parts and a “glass” finish. The look was particularly popular in Britain and on red carpets, fueled by celebrity stylists and the rise of the flat ironed “Instagram hair.” Heigh focused hairstyles such as messy buns and sock buns continued to see prevalence until the end of the decade.

Curtain bangs

By 2019, curtain bangs began to trend, often paired with layered cuts reminiscent of 90s styles. A popular variation featured long, face-framing strands dyed in a contrasting collar, often platinum blonde or a bright neon set against darker hair. This two-tone look was sometimes referred to as "e-girl streaks" and was associated with the rising influence of TikTok. This also marked a shift toward more face-framing and grown-out fringe silhouettes at the end of the decade.

=== Men ===
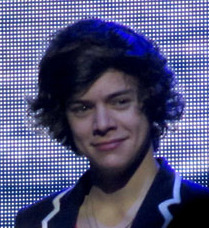
Musician Harry Styles sporting a wings haircut in 2012.

In the early 2010s, men's 1930s, 1940s, and 1950s haircuts underwent a revival, with many British professionals aged 18–50 wearing businessman's haircuts with side partings, quiffs or slicked back hair. The undercut has been a particularly ubiquitous trend since the early part of the decade, seeing popularity across different social groups in both Western and Asian cultures. These gradually replaced the longer surfer hair and wings haircuts popular among teenagers and young men since 2010. In the Americas and the Middle East, the military haircut and buzzcut are relatively popular among balding men, or the side parted hair with some volume on the top, inspired by footballer Cristiano Ronaldo.

For African-American and black men in general, mohawk variants of the Afro, The 360 Waves, jheri curl and The Taper were popular in the early to mid 2010s, as are shaved patterns or "steps" into variants of the buzzcut. The High Top Fade, often with a bleached blonde streak inspired by Wiz Khalifa, came back into style among African American youth on the West Coast. Starting from late 2014, variants of tapered Dreadlocks and Hair twists hair styles became widely popular amongst many black teens and young men.

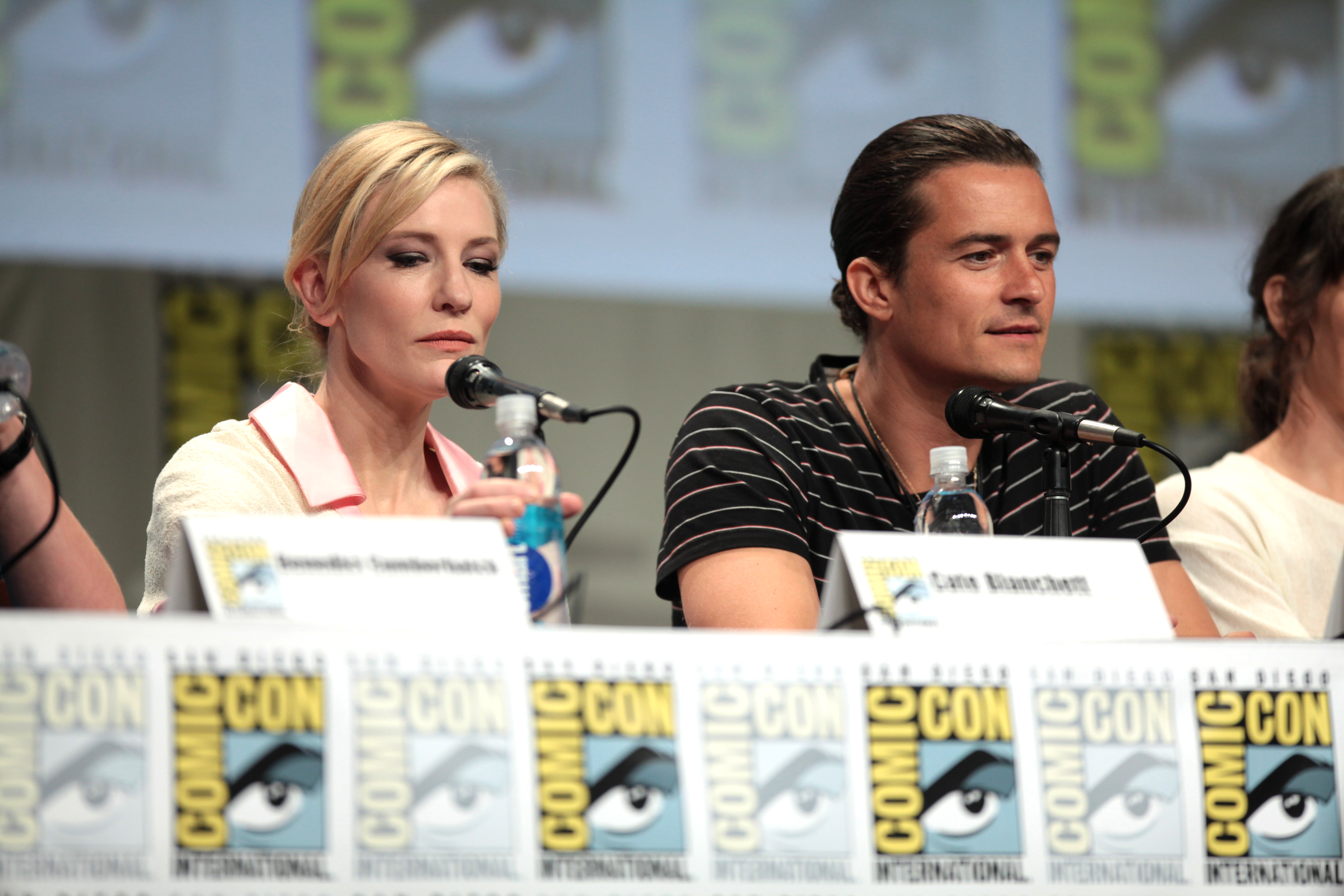
Orlando Bloom with Samurai bun, 2014

From 2014 some teens and young men wore their hair in a type of topknot or "man bun" reminiscent of the ancient Chinese and the samurai hairstyles. This trend was popularised by British and American celebrities including actors Orlando Bloom and Jared Leto as well as footballer Gareth Bale.

By 2017, the undercut hairstyle and buzzcut began to decline in the United States, partly due to the unintended popularity of these haircuts among supporters of the alt-right, such as white supremacist Richard Spencer. British hipsters frequently left their undercut unstyled in imitation of 1990s Britpop and early Beatles haircuts. However, undercut and buzzcut hair styles continued to predominate in Brazil, Morocco, Egypt, Uruguay, Paraguay, and Algeria in the late 2010s and early 2020s.

=== Youth ===
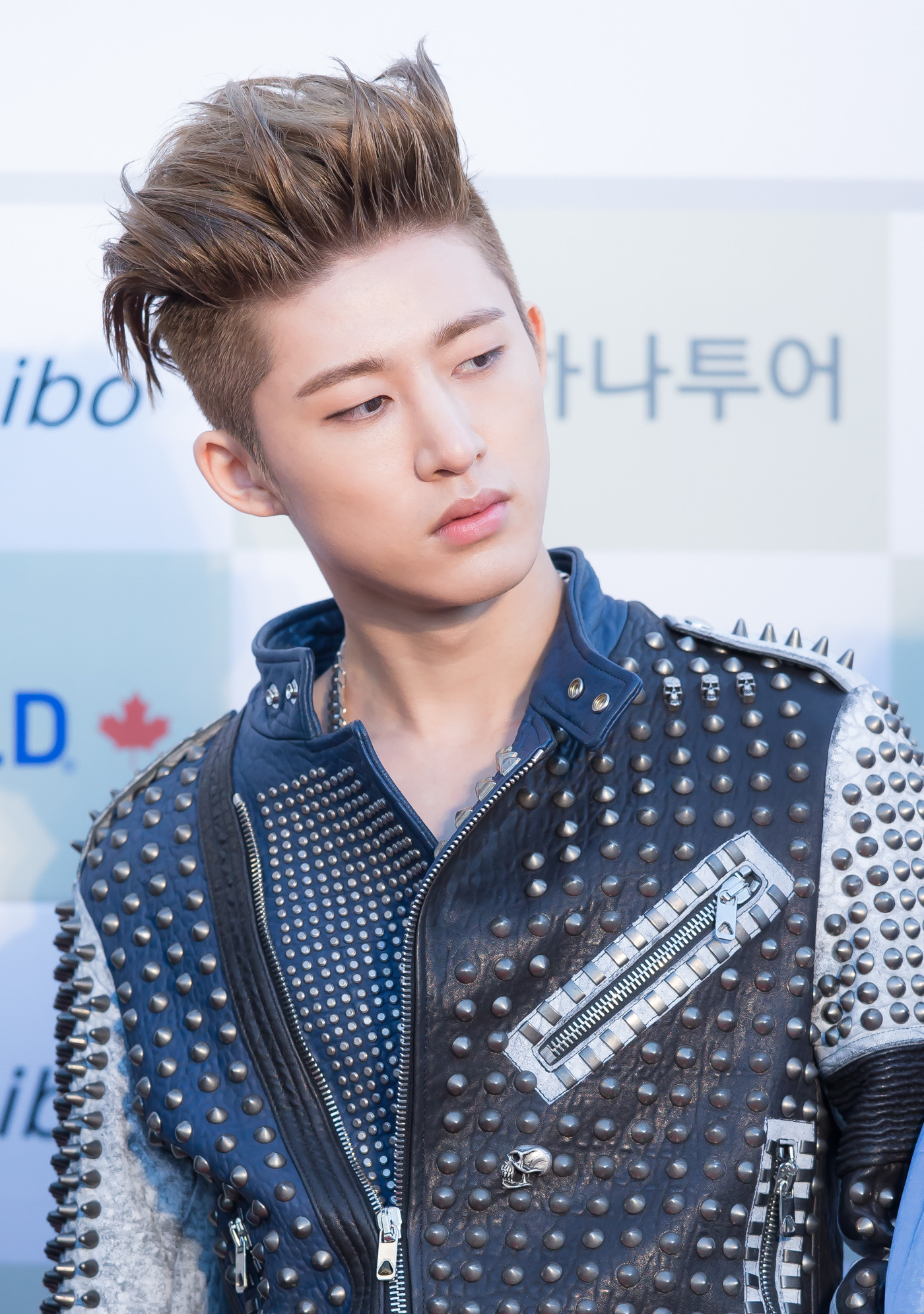
K-pop star B.I sporting an undercut hairstyle, 2016

For preteen and teenaged girls, and young women in higher education, the bangs and thin headband combination remained popular in the US and Europe for much of the decade. Dutch braids, twin French braids, side ponytails, and a single chunky side braid were popular styles for those with longer hair throughout the mid and late 2010s. Side parting was popular in America, and in 2019 ponytails with scrunchies were increasingly popular not only for sport and exercise, but also everyday especially with high ponytails, side ponytails and high buns. In the late 2010s middle veins were very popular especially in Britain, Ireland and the rest of Europe. The chin length bob cut, long hair with choppy side bangs, and straight middle parted longer hair were also popular styles in the US, Europe, New Zealand and Australia.

In the UK, Middle East, and Australia during the early 2010s, a type of short mullet haircut with buzzed sides and bleached blond streaks became popular among sporty male young people, teenage Irish travellers, and urban youths of Iranian and Lebanese descent inspired by The Combination crime film. By 2013, a long undercut or mohawk-like haircut, in which only one side of the head is buzzed, became popular among circles of ravers, hipster girls, metalcore, and dubstep fans in the US, inspired by Skrillex and various female pop stars such as Ellie Goulding, Tess Aquarium, Miley Cyrus, or Rihanna. The emo style fringes also went out of fashion around the same time. By 2015 and 2016, the balayage – a softer version off the ombré – gained popularity, as well as having a blunt haircut instead of layered hair. The lob (long bob cut) was considered a unique alternative to the long hair worn by most adolescent girls and young women in Europe.

For adolescent boys and young men, in the United States, Canada, Australasia, the UK and South Korea, the layered short hair style, the buzzed short hairstyle which is blended from the sides to the top, and the Blowout (hairstyle) became popular during the mid-2010s due to continued interest in 1980s and 1990s fashion. Additionally the side swept bangs, the quiff, and the layered longer hair of the late 2000s remain fashionable among more affluent American young men.

== Makeup and beauty trends ==
=== Makeup and cosmetics ===
In Britain, the smoky eye look of the late 2000s carried on as a trend in many parts of the country. In other areas, this went out of fashion during the early and mid 2010s as women sought to imitate the fake tan and thick "Scouse brow" popularized by Catherine Middleton, Cara Delevingne and the cast of The Only Way is Essex and Desperate Scousewives. Fake tan became the norm look for young teens especially in Ireland. Multiple layers of tan would be worn to give an orange effect.

In the West, contouring (a technique using different shades of makeup to create highlighted angles, creating an illusion of higher cheekbones, slim nose and a sharper jawline) began to emerge. Several other more short-lived trends were born out of this, such as strobing in 2015 and 2016 which consisted of using glowy highlighters to accentuate the high points of the face. The early decade's "erased-mouth" and pale pink lipsticks were replaced by matte red by 2012–13, as sported by celebrities such as Taylor Swift and Rihanna. By 2015–16, mauve and brown shades of lipstick make a comeback from the 1990s, promoted by Kylie Jenner. Dark mascara, false eyelashes, dyed hair and cheek blush were popularised by Instagram social media influencers in the UK, American and Dubai such as Olivia Buckland and Huda Kattan.

Unlike in previous decades, excessive use of fake-tans has become less popular in the United States, possibly due to tanning beds being linked to cancer.

In late 2016, minimalist, makeup looks and "dewy" natural skin saw a surge of popularity among young people, especially in New York City.

In the late 2010s, a softer, goth inspired, style of makeup came into fashion, this was called egirl makeup. This style of makeup included small, black symbols drawn under the eyes (predominantly hearts) and winged eyeliner, both of these trends drew attention to the eyes. Another part of egirl makeup was large amounts of blush all over the cheeks and nose, finished off by highlighter on the nose.

=== Body modifications ===
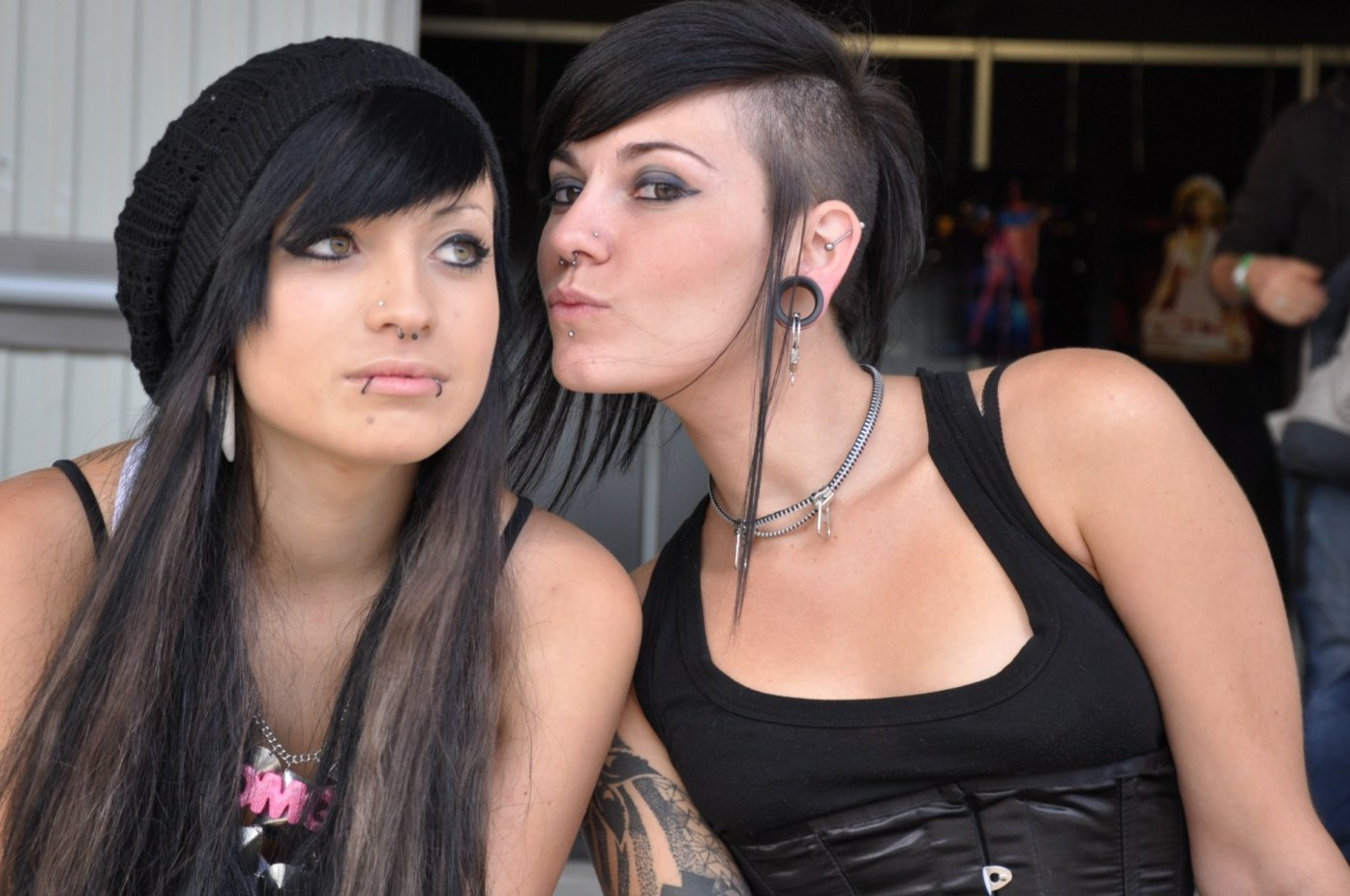
Two young women with "hardcore" undercuts, facial piercings, and tattoos.

Continuing trends from the 2000s, tattoos and piercings became increasingly visible in mainstream fashion during the 2010s. Traditional, Old school tattoo, and retro revival or pinup girl style tattoos were especially prominent.

Lip piercings, tongue piercings, and stretched earlobes also found popularity, particularly among younger people and alternative subcultures. More extreme body modifications, including facial tattoos, gained visibility through musicians and social media, though they remained outside the mainstream.

More extreme modifications, such as facial tattoos, were seen on celebrities such as 6ix9ine and Post Malone.

=== Facial hair ===
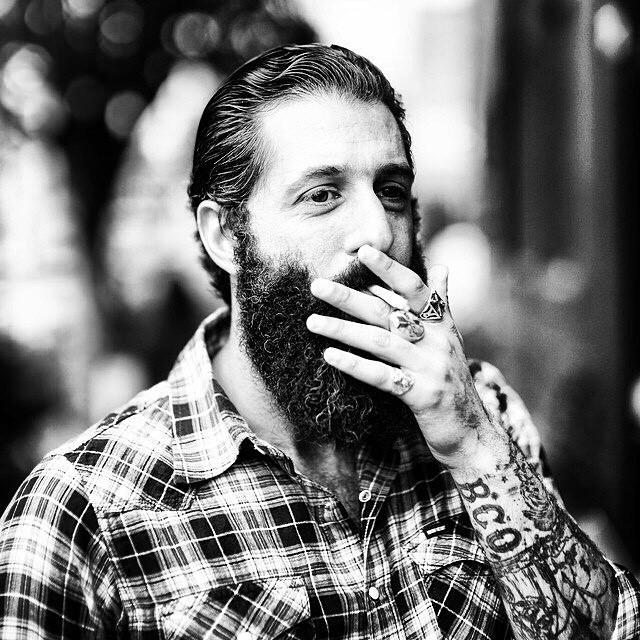
A man with sleeve tattoos, beard and flannel shirt, mid 2010s

Facial hair was a major trend throughout the decade, especially groomed, full beards and heavy stubble. These were influenced by the hipster look and its associated lumbersexual trend and campaigns like Movember.

== Exhibitions ==
=== 2010 ===
- "American Woman: Fashioning a National Identity" May 5 until August 15 at the Costume Institute at Metropolitan Museum of Art in New York City (Drawn form the costume collection of the Brooklyn Museum which was transferred to the Metropolitan Museum in 2008).

=== 2011 ===
- "Daphne Guinness" curated by Daphne Guinness and Valerie Steele September 16 until January 7, 2012, at the Museum at FIT in New York City.
- "Alexander McQueen: Savage beauty" May 4 until August 7 at the Costume Institute at the Metropolitan Museum of Art in New York City.
- "Vivienne Westwood, 1980–89" March 8 until April 2 at the Museum at FIT in New York City.

=== 2012 ===
- "Fashion and Technology" December 4 until May 8, 2013, at the Museum at FIT in New York City.
- "Schiaperelli and Prada: Impossible Conversations" May 10 until August 19 at the Costume Institute at the Metropolitan Museum of Art in New York City.

=== 2013 ===
- "A Queer History of Fashion: From the Closet to the Catwalk" September 13 until January 4, 2014, at the Museum at FIT in New York City.
- "Punk: Chaos to Couture" May 9 until August 14 at the Costume Institute at the Metropolitan Museum of Art in New York City.

=== 2014 ===
- "Charles James: Beyond Fashion" May 8 until August 10 at the Costume Institute at the metropolitan Museum of Art in New York City.

=== 2015 ===
- "China: Through the Looking Glass" May 7 through September 7 at the Costume Institute at the Metropolitan Museum of Art in New York City.

=== 2016 ===
- "Manus x Machina: Fashion In An Age Of Technology" May 5 until September 5 at the Costume Institute at the Metropolitan Museum of Art in New York City.

=== 2017 ===
- "Rei Kawakubo/Comme des Garçons: Art of the In-Between" May 4 until September 4 at the Anna Wintour Costume Center at the Metropolitan Museum of Art in New York City.

=== 2018 ===
- "Heavenly Bodies: Fashion and the Catholic Imagination" May 10 until October 8 at the Anna Winter Costume Center at the Metropolitan Museum of Art in New York City.
- "Norell: Dean of American Fashion" February 9 until April 14 at the Museum of at FIT in New York City, New York.

=== 2019 ===
- "Thierry Mugler: Couturissime" March 2 until 8 at the Montréal Museum of Fine Arts in Montreal, Quebec, Canada. then traveled to the Musée des Arts Décoratifs, Paris from September 30. 2021 to April 24, 2022.
- "Camp: Notes on Fashion" May 9 until September 8 at the Anna Wintour Costume Center at the Metropolitan Museum of Art in New York City.
- "Pierre Cardin: Future Fashion" July 20 until January 5, 2020, at the Brooklyn Museum.
- "Christian Dior: Designer of Dreams" February 2 until September 1 at the Victoria and Albert Museum in London, United Kingdom.
- "Minimalism/Maximalism" May 28 until November 16 at the Museum at the FIT in New York City, New York.
- "Paris: Capital of Fashion" September 6 until January 4, 2020, at the Museum at FIT in New York City, New York.
- "The World of Anna Sui" September 12 until February 23, 2020, at the Museum of Art and Design in New York City.
- "In Pursuit of Fashion: The Sandy Schreier Collection" November 27 until May 17, 2020, at the Anna Winter Costume Center at the Metropolitan Museum of Art in New York City.

== Gallery ==
=== Style gallery 2010–2013 ===
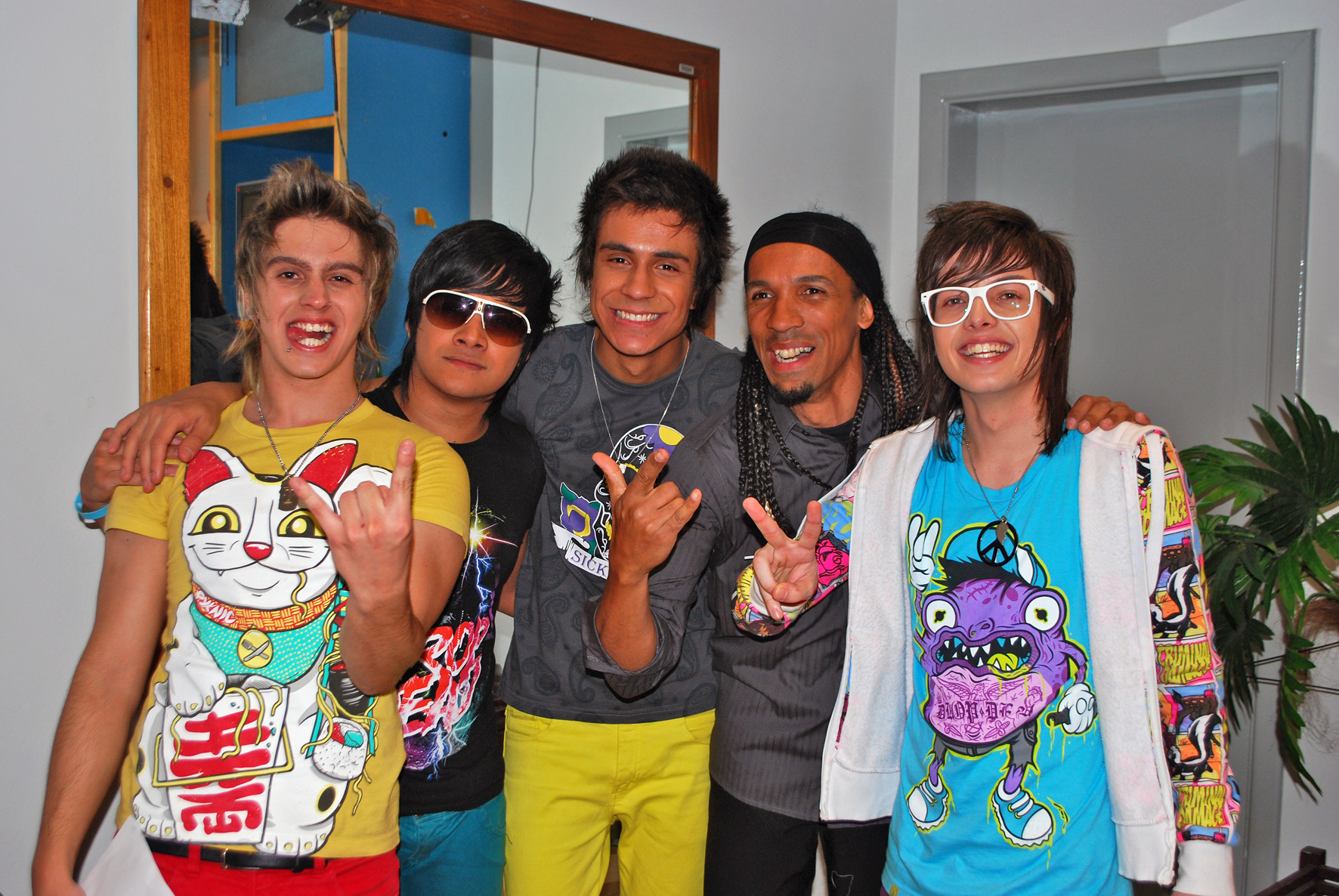
Brazilian indie pop group Restart wearing "colorido" fashion, popular for most of the early 2010s in Brazil.

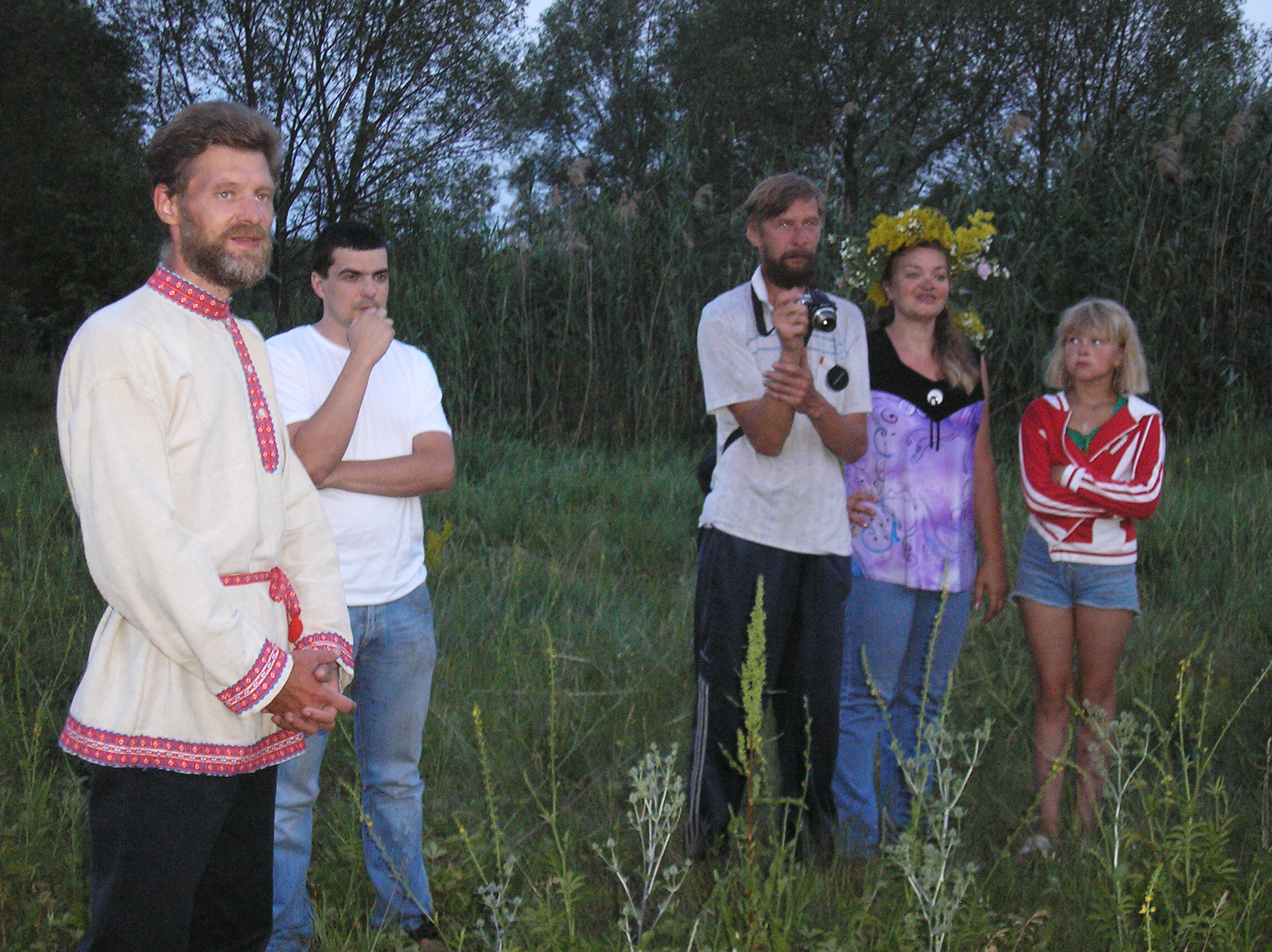
Russian farmer family in 2010, showing a mix of contemporary clothing and traditional folk costume elements.

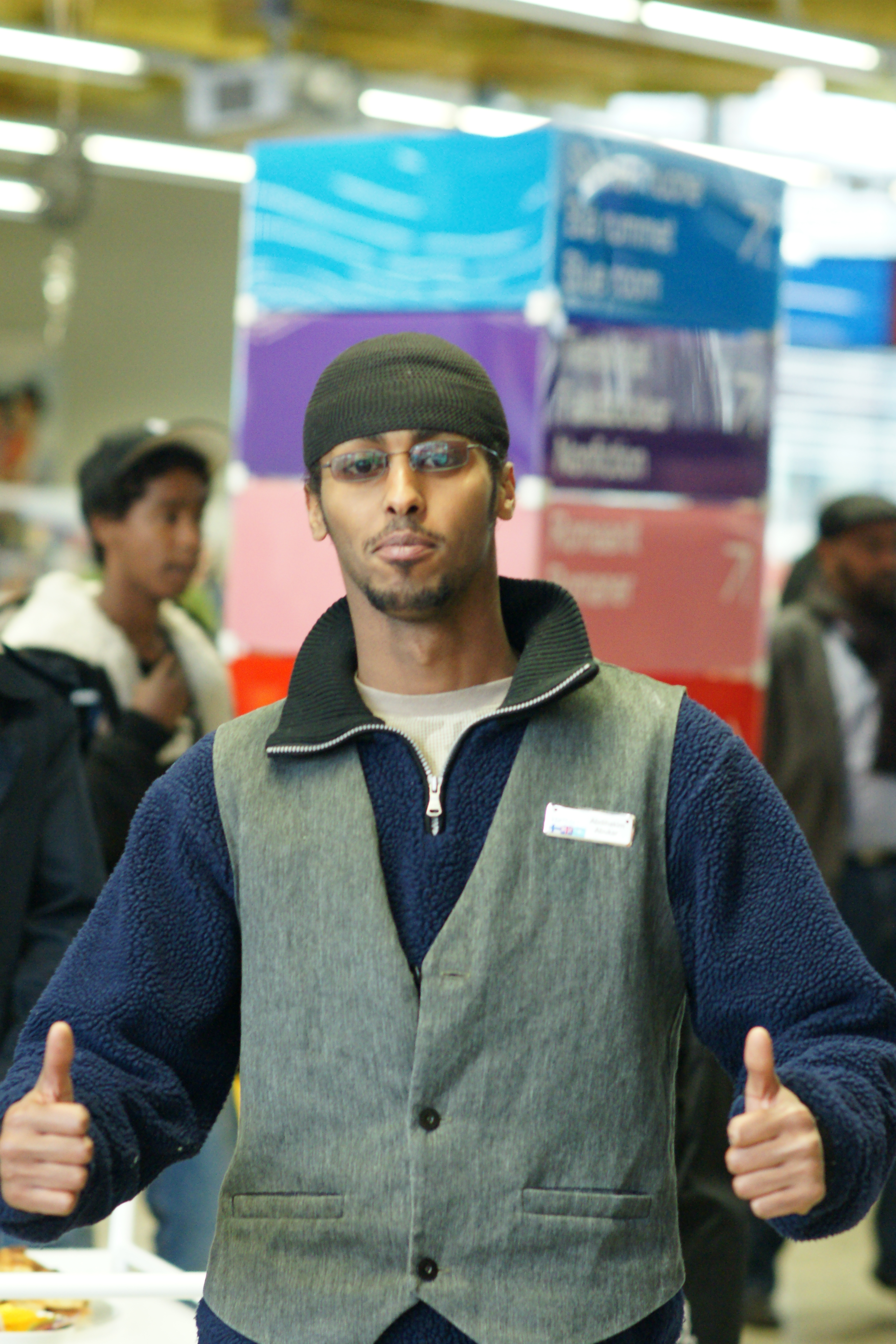
Somali man wearing waistcoat, tuque and polar fleece, illustrating East African diaspora fashion in 2010.

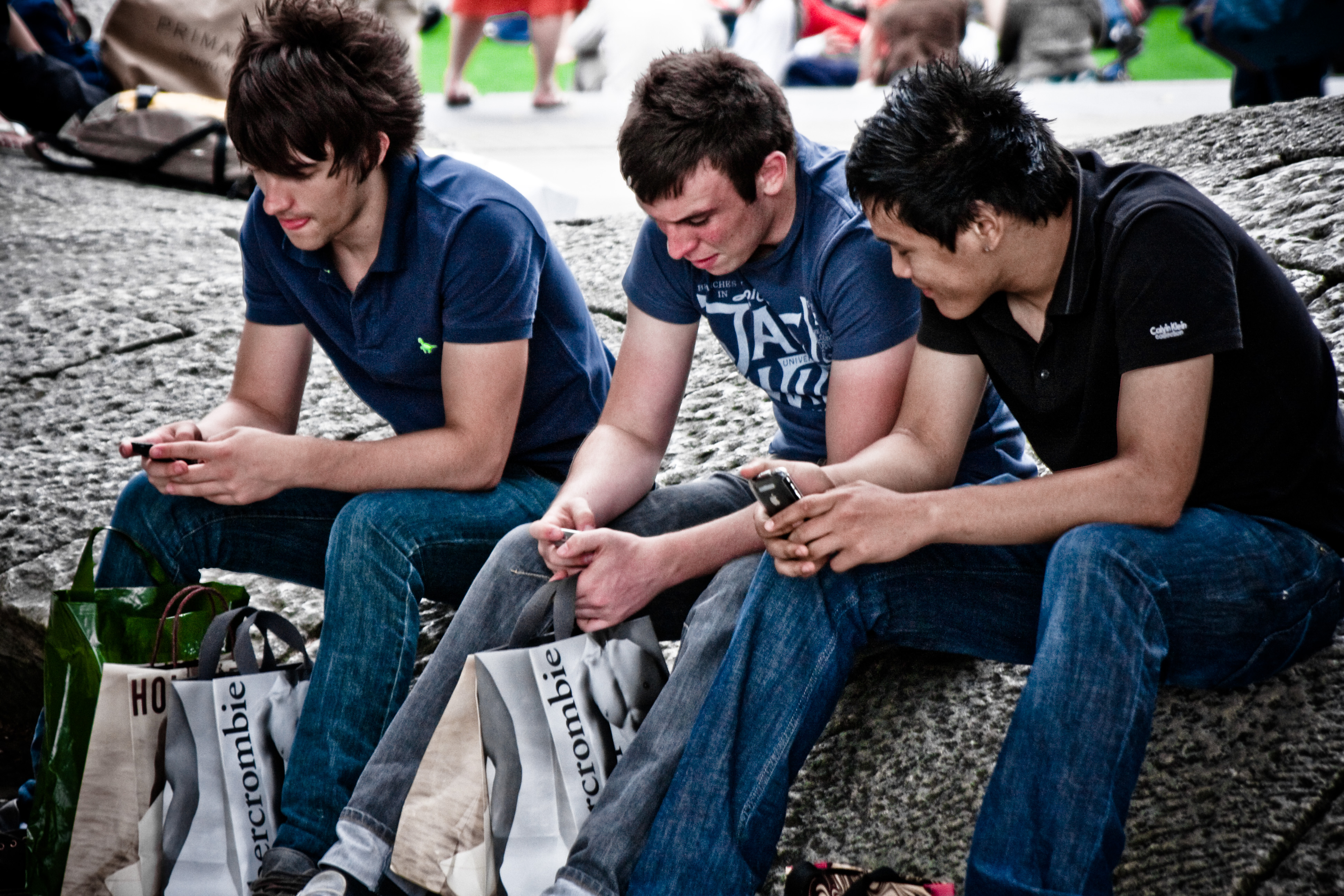
Young men in London, 2010, wearing slim-cut jeans and layered T-shirts and polos, typical of middle-class streetwear influenced by Abercrombie & Fitch.

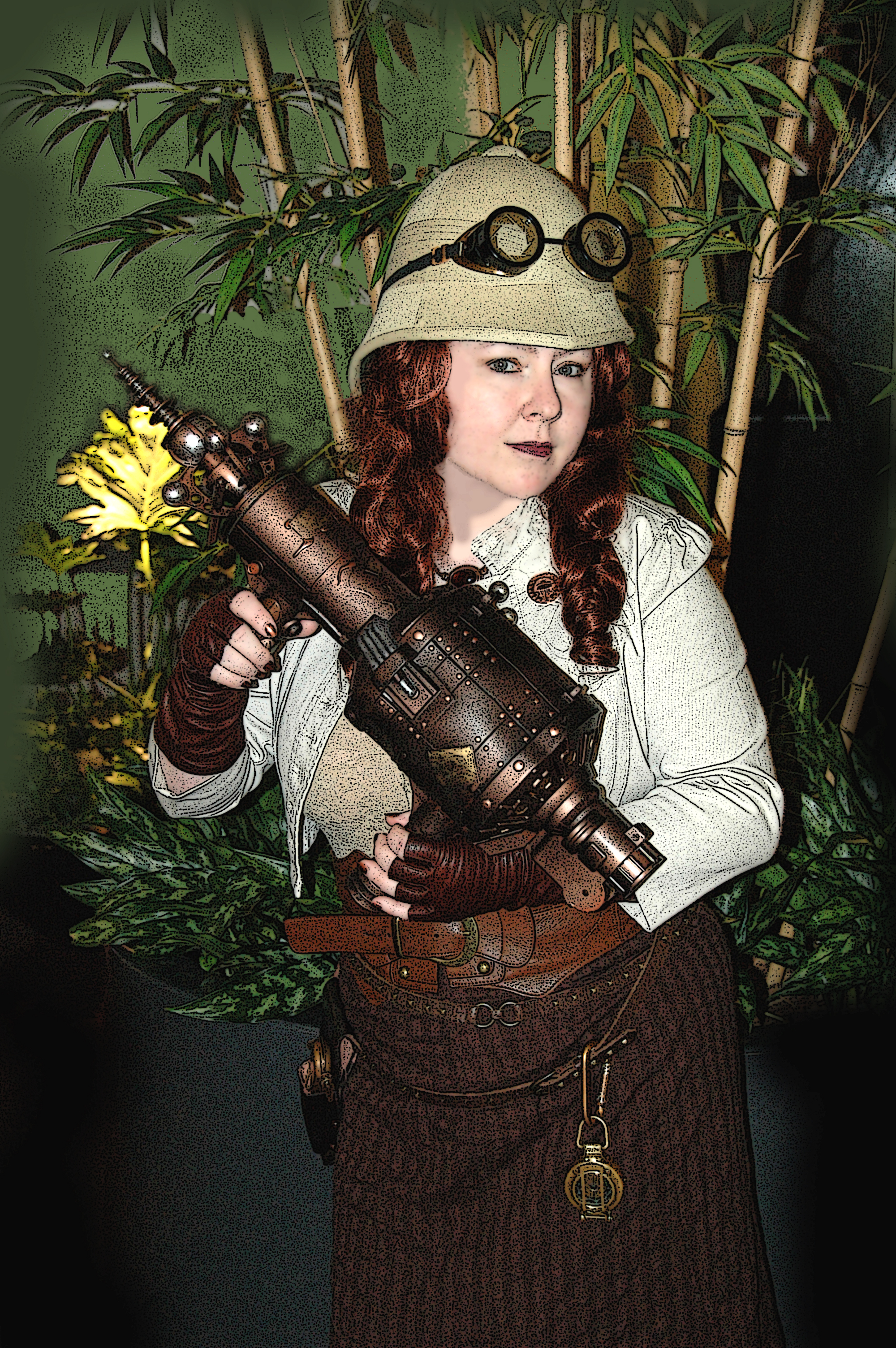
Woman wearing Neo-Victorian steampunk costume, including goggles and pith helmet, 2010.

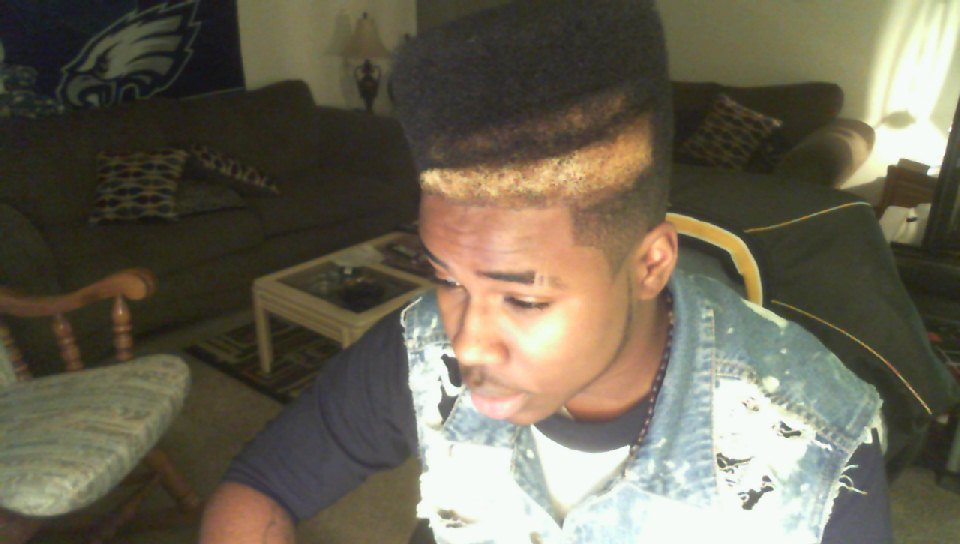
American teenager with hi-top fade and distressed acid wash denim vest, 2010, showing early 2010s retro revival trends.

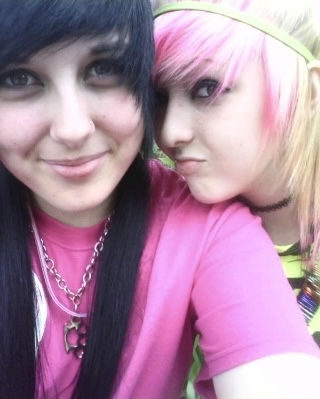
Two teen girls in scene style, with dyed hair, bright graphic tops, and edgy jewelry typical of MySpace-era subcultures, 2010.

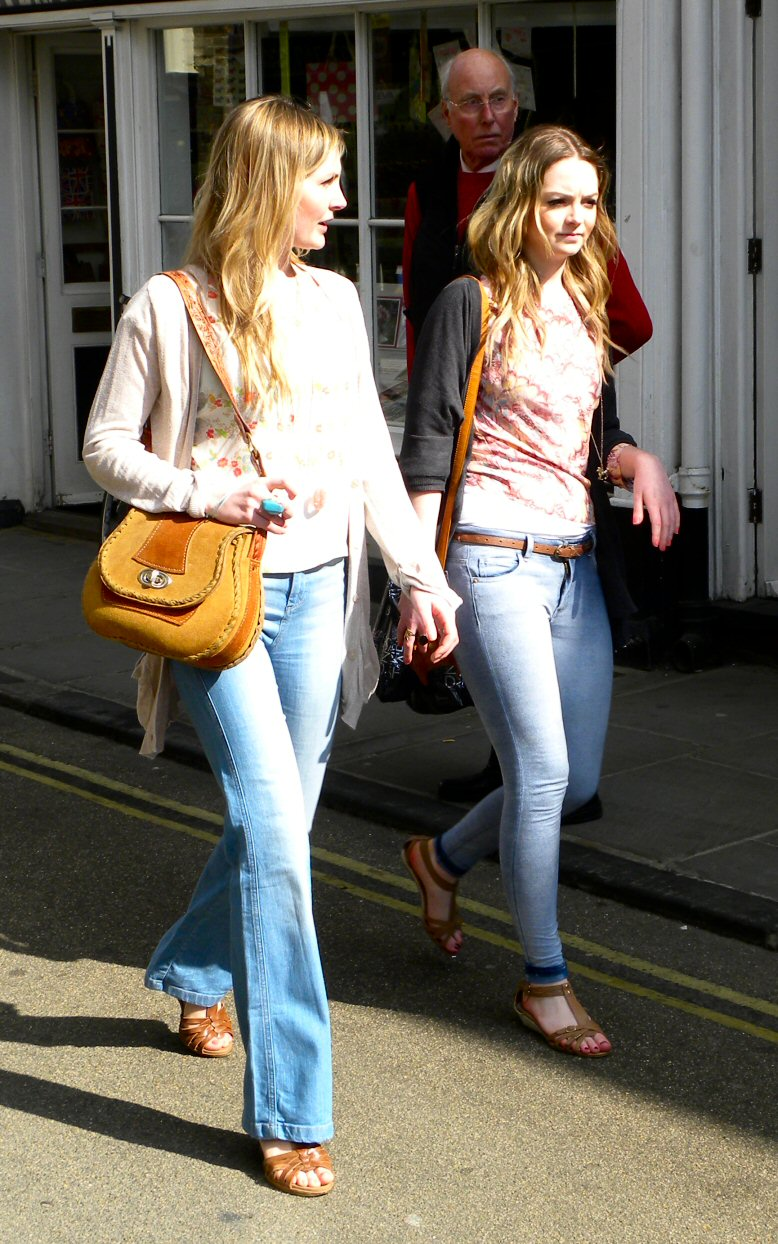
Two women wearing flared trousers, jeggings and oversized cardigans, 2011.

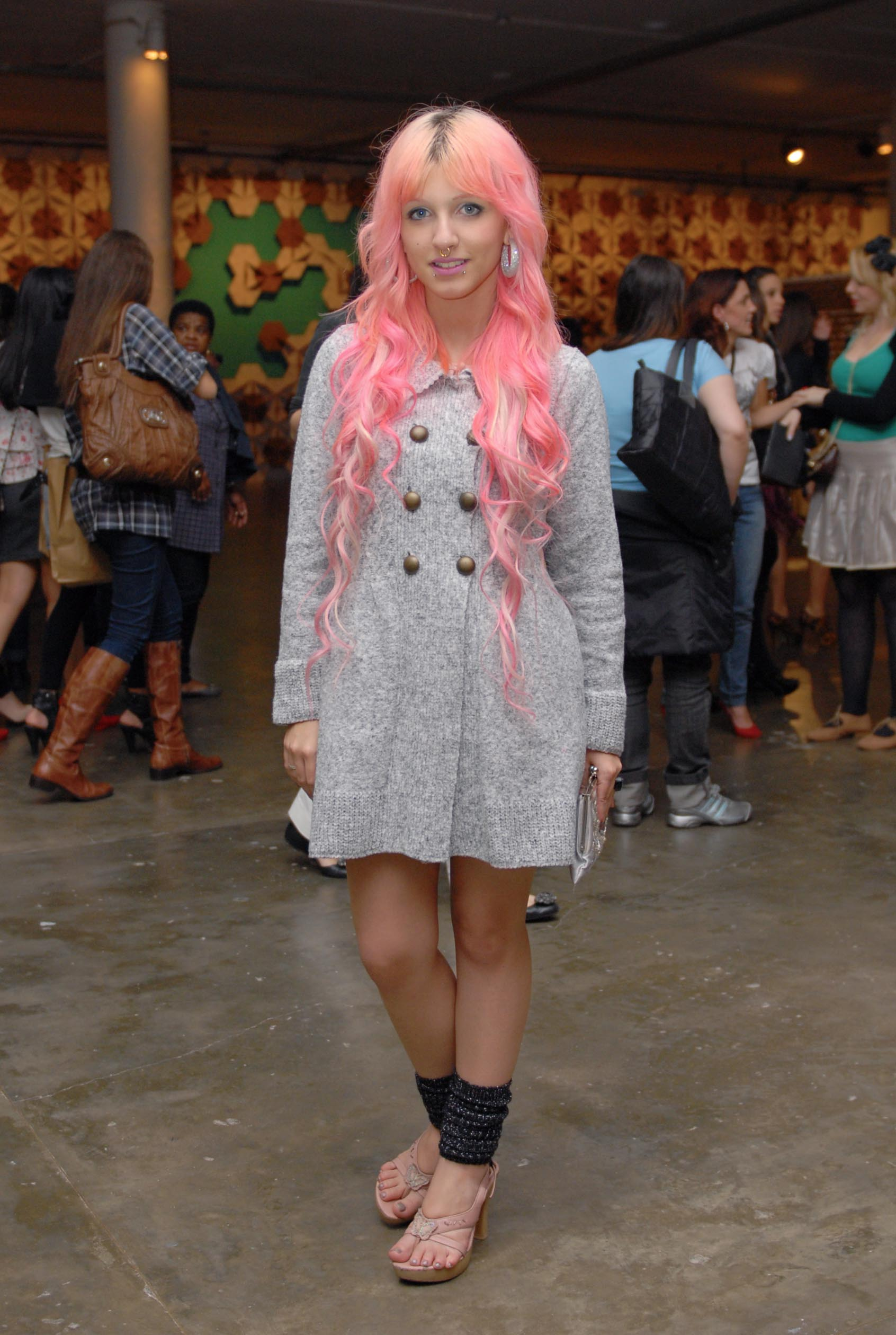
Brazilian girl wearing leg warmers, knitted sweater dress, and pastel hair, blending retro and alternative aesthetics into hipster style, 2011.

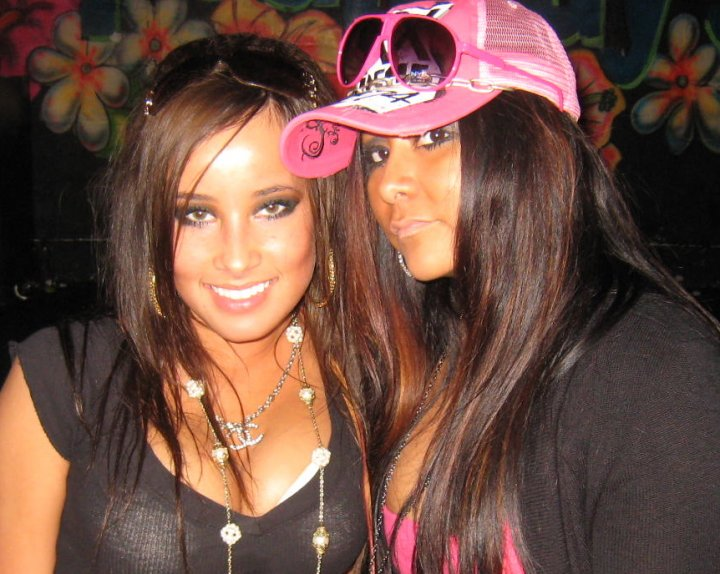
A young woman and Snooki in typical club wear, 2011.

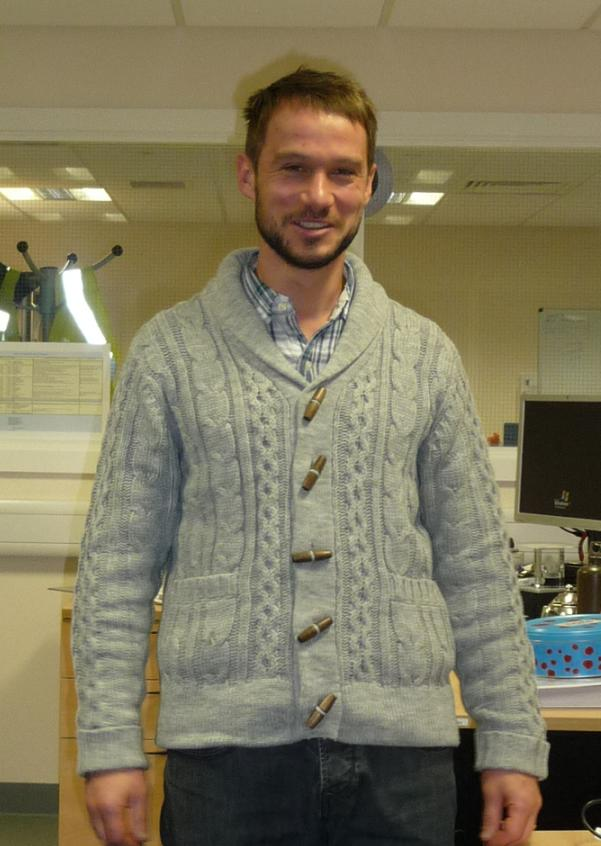
Man wearing shawl collar cardigan and hipster-inspired beard, 2011.

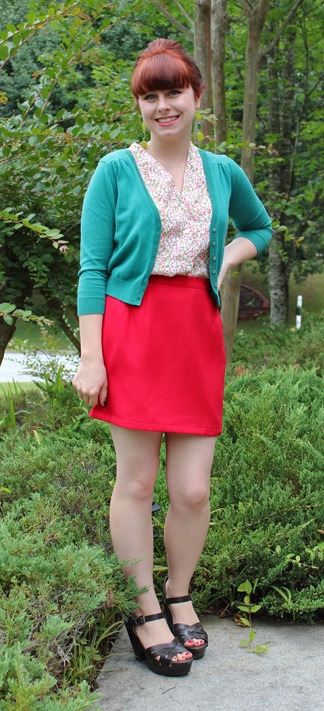
Woman in a red miniskirt and green cardigan crop, 2012.

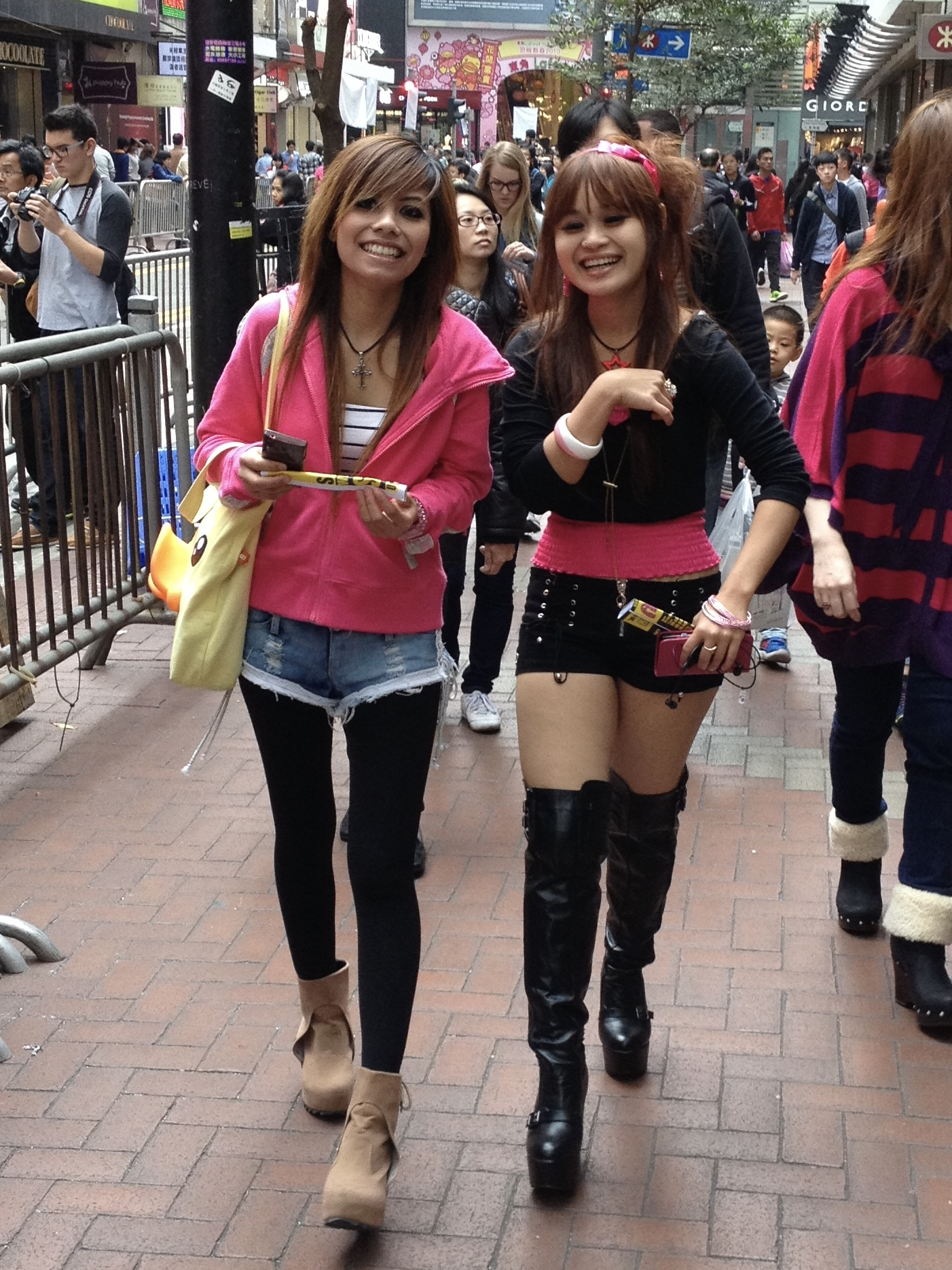
Young women in Hong Kong wearing layered street style with accessories and hairstyles influenced by Japanese gyaru and J-pop aesthetics, 2013.

=== Style gallery 2014–2016 ===
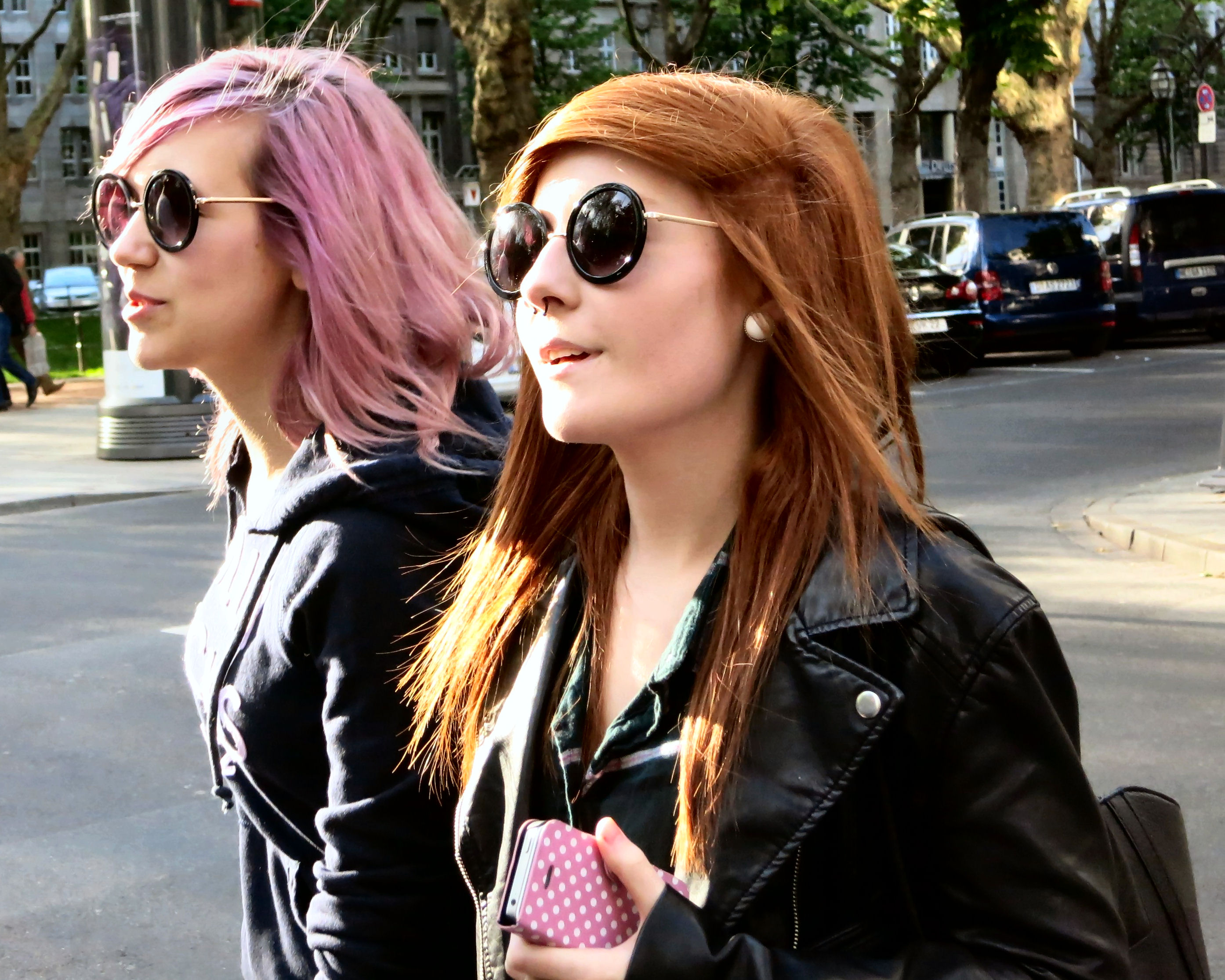
Two young women in Germany wearing round sunglasses, and casual monochrome streetwear typical of Tumblr inspired fashion, 2014.

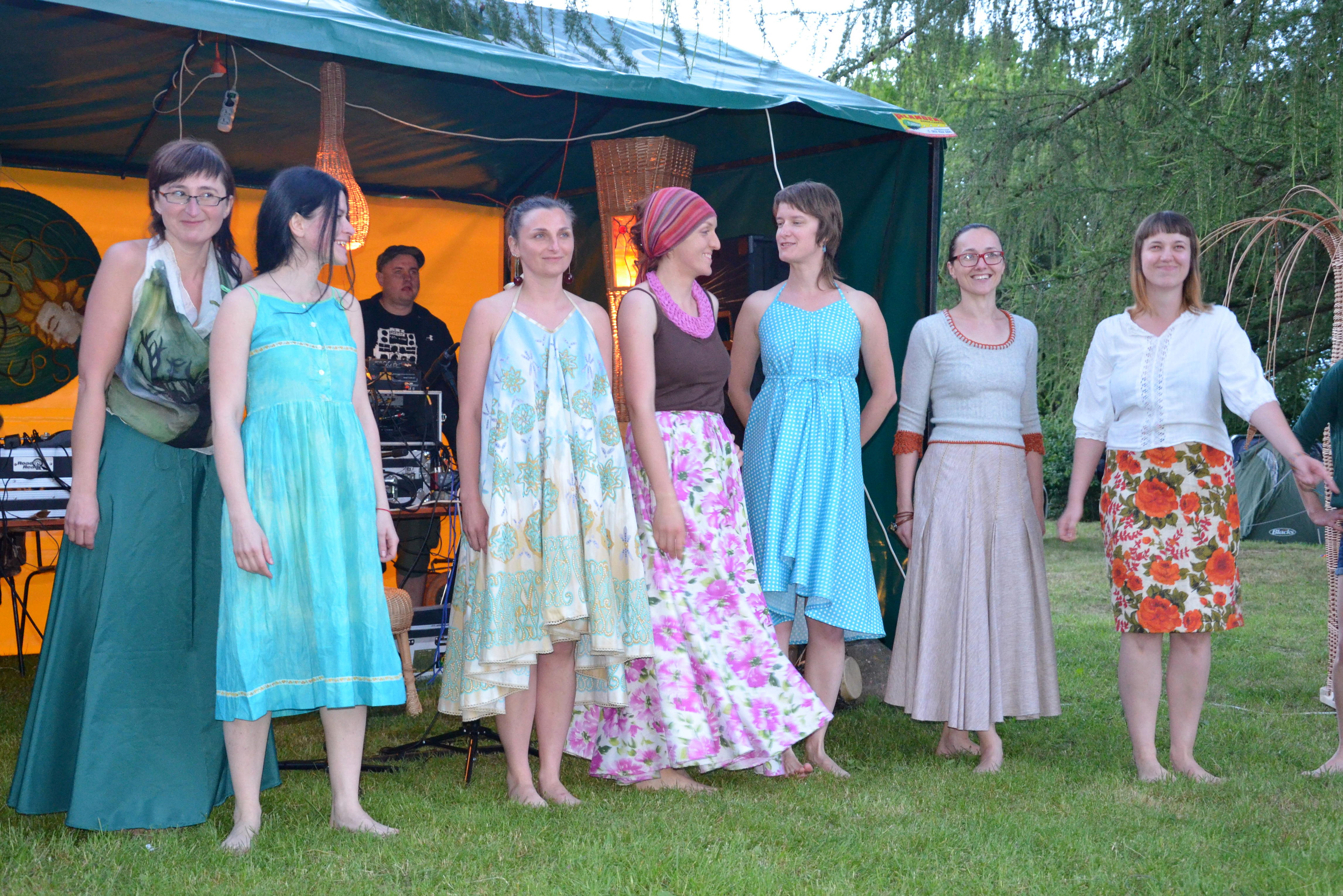
Polish women wearing boho- or hippie-inspired dresses, floral prints and peasant blouses, 2014.

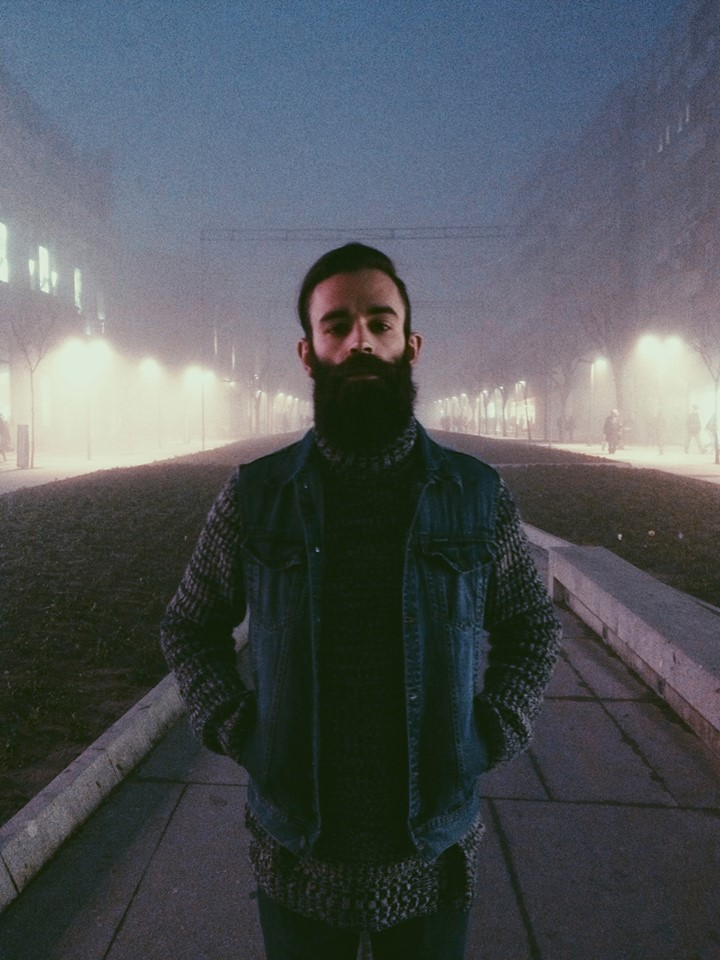
Portuguese man in minimalist attire and well-groomed beard in hipster style, 2014.

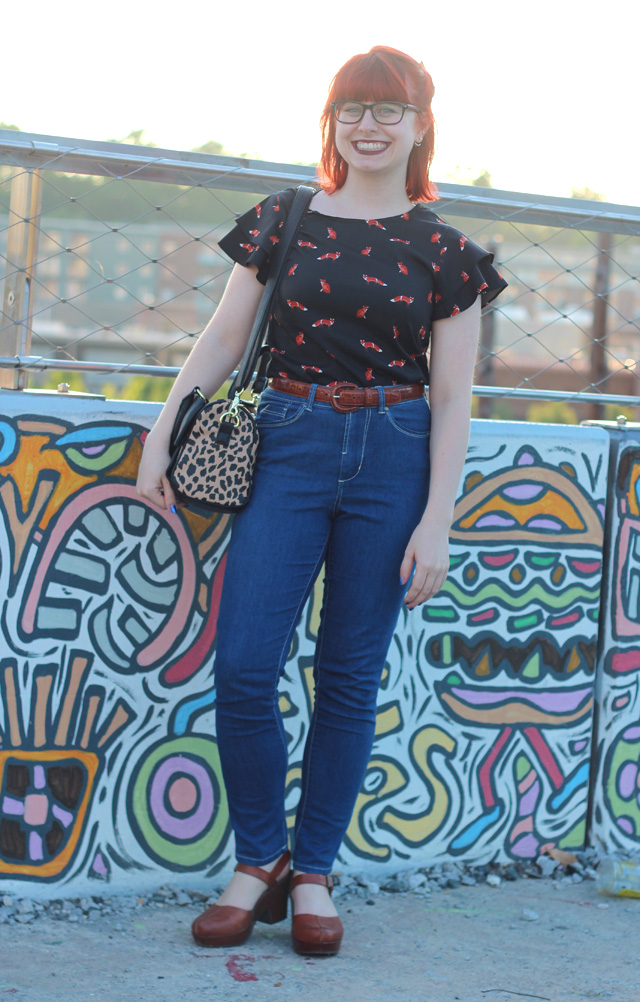
A woman wearing thick framed glasses and kitschy prints, 2015.

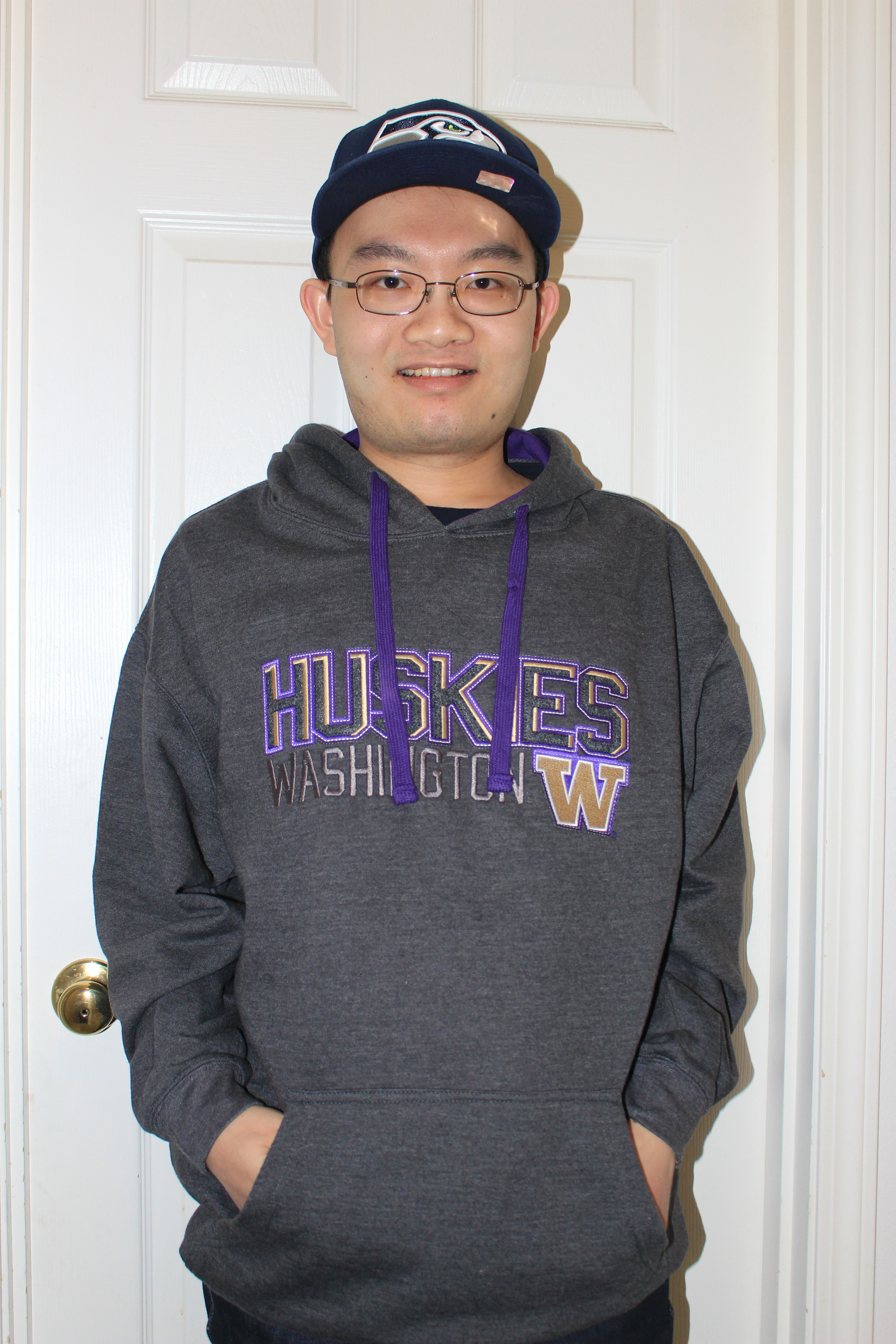
A man wearing pullover hoodie and a snapback cap in 2015, influenced by sports and skate fashion.

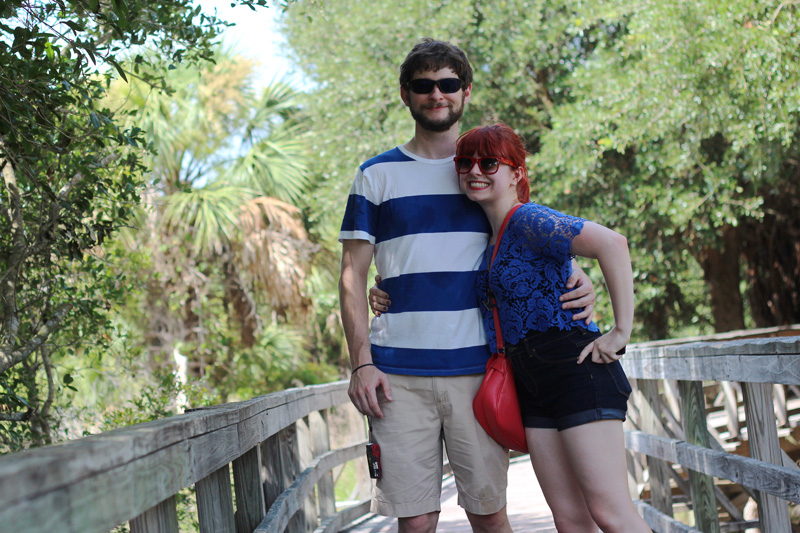
Tourists in Georgia (U.S.), 2015, wearing casual clothes with cargo shorts and sneakers, typical of everyday American style.

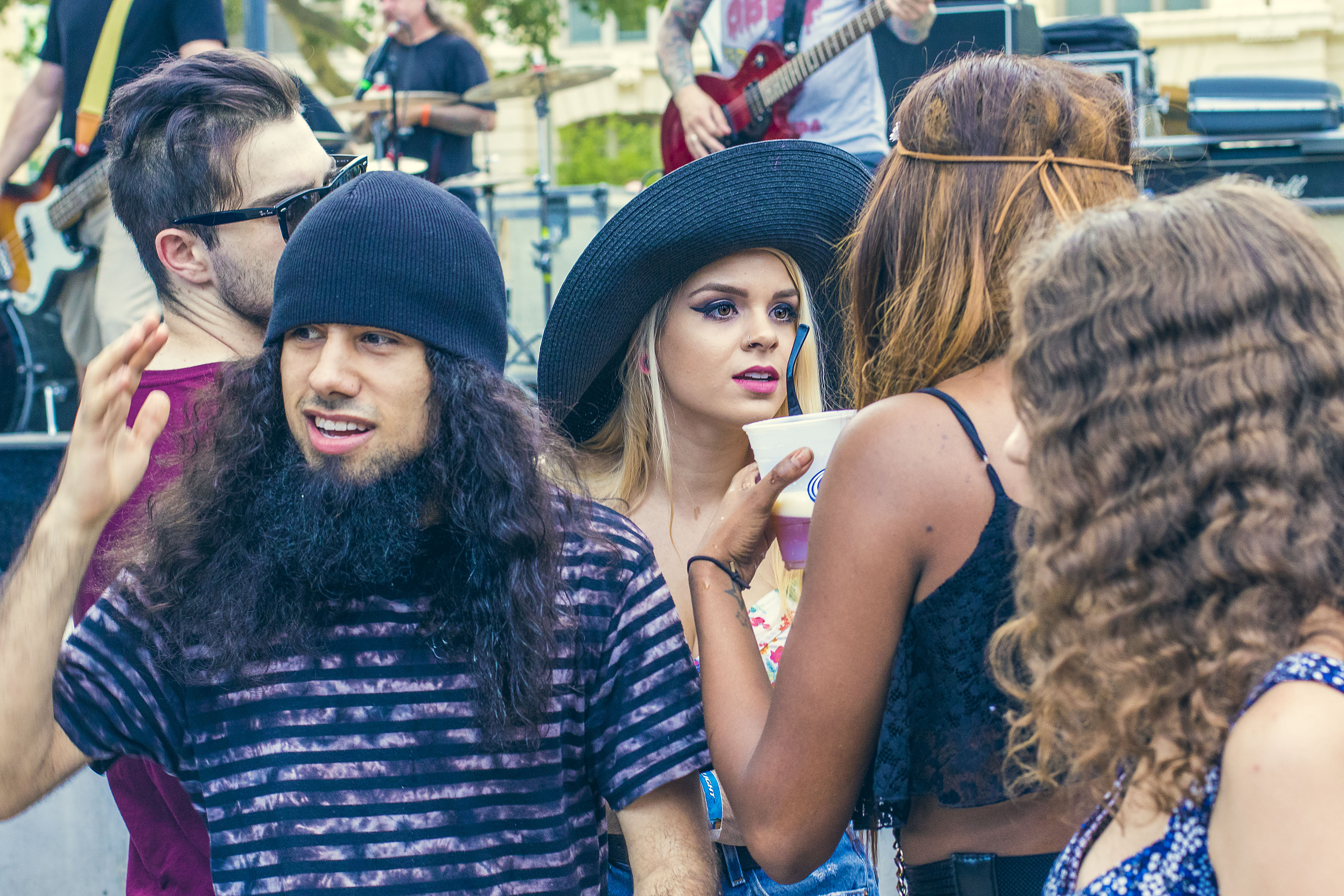
Young adults wearing festival styles at an outdoor event in Sacramento, 2015.

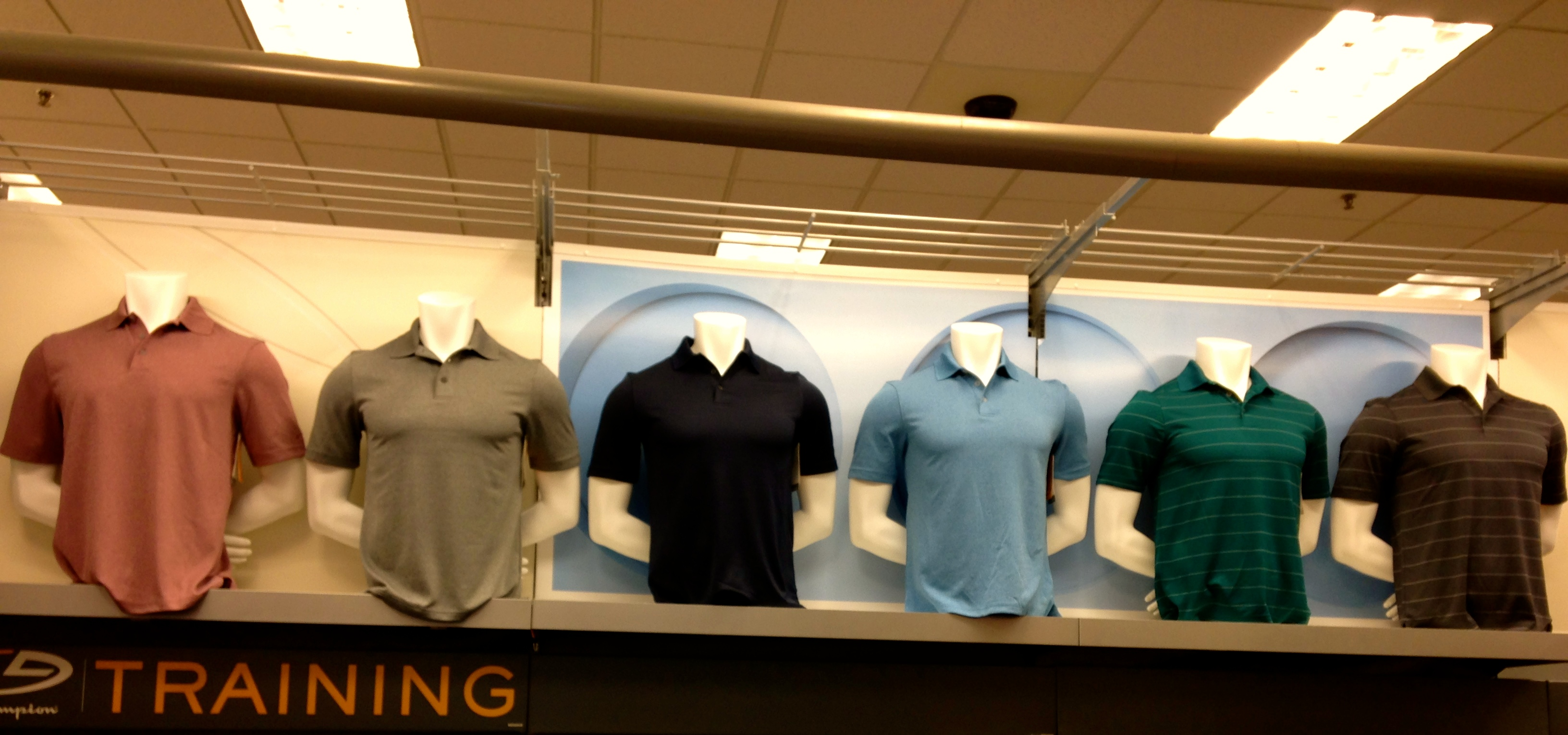
Men's polo shirts in more muted earth tones, 2015, reflecting the shift from neon and bright colors toward minimal, mature palettes.

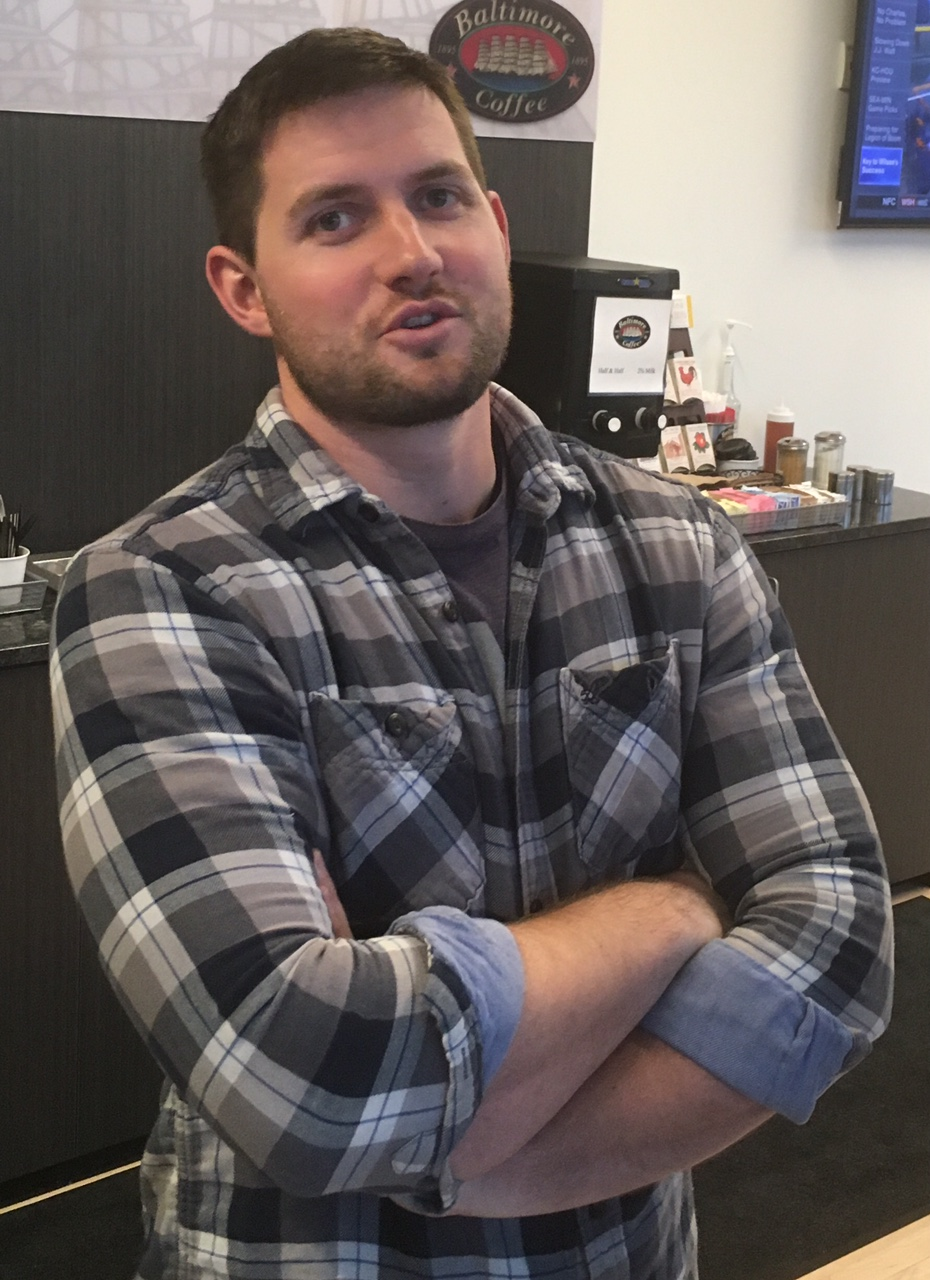
A man in Lumbersexual style, 2016, wearing a flannel shirt and groomed beard, blending rugged Americana with hipster grooming trends.

=== Style gallery 2017–2019 ===
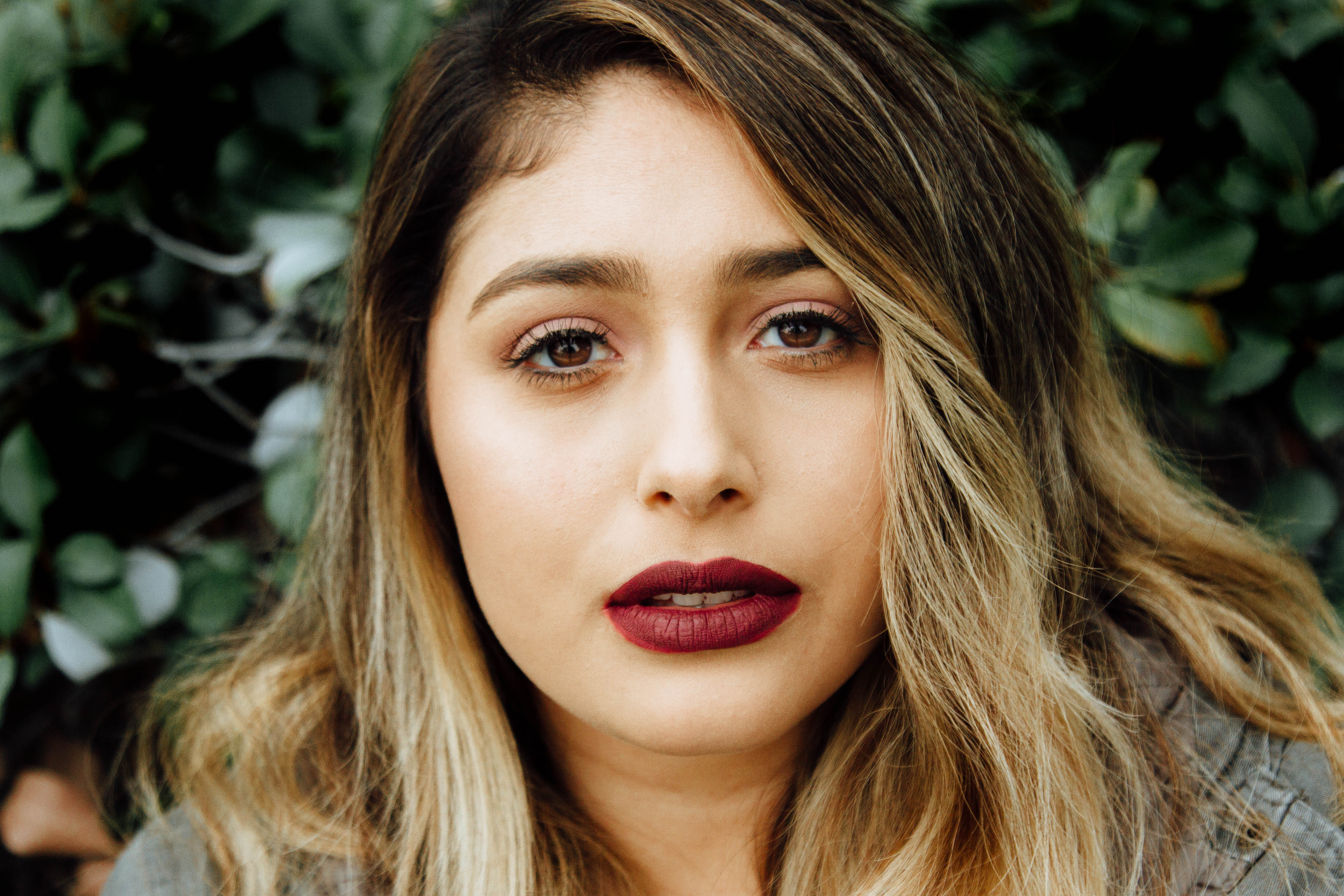
Woman wearing Instagram-influenced bold lipstick and contour makeup popular in the mid to late-2010s, 2017.

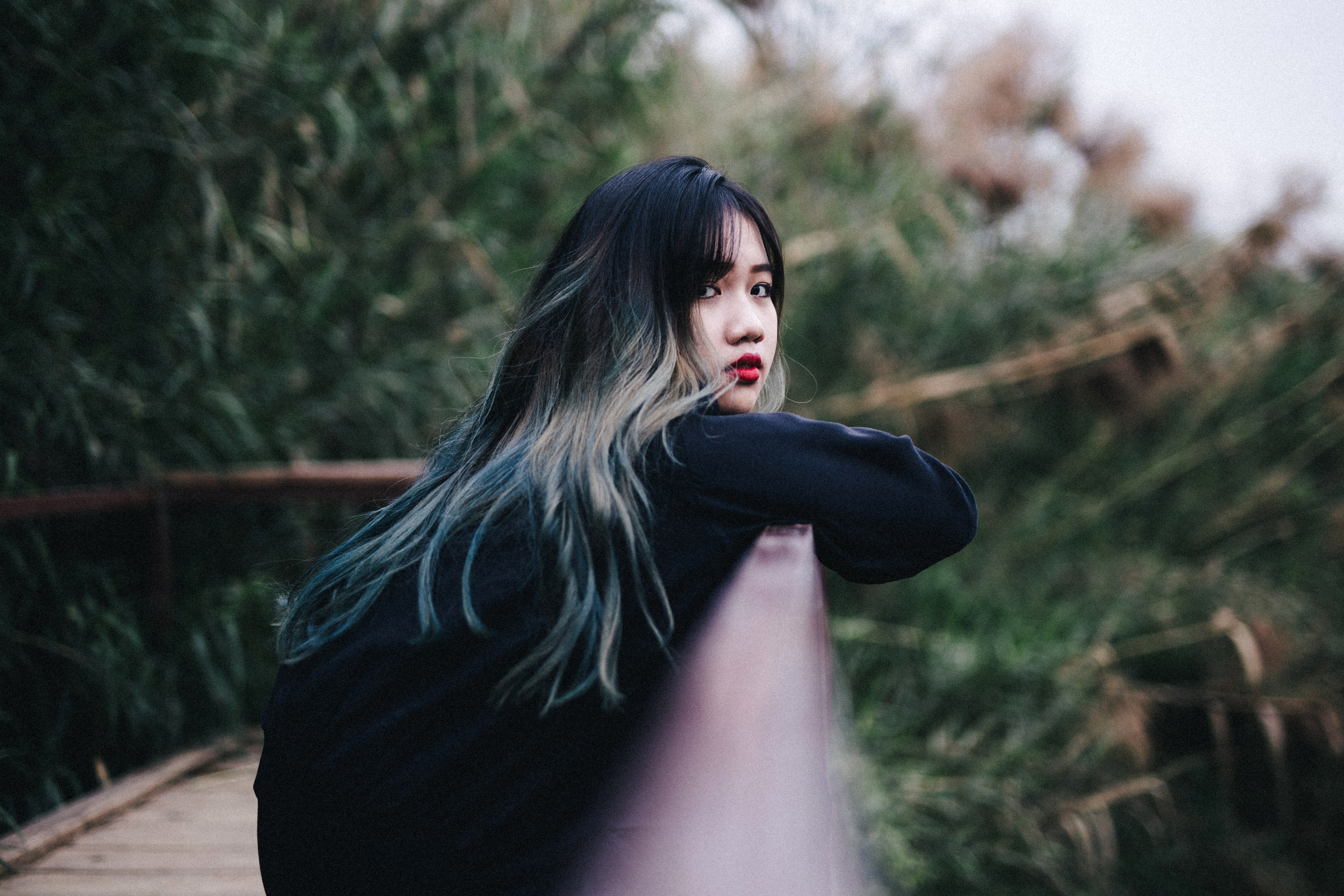
Woman with ombré hair, 2017, a coloring technique that remained popular throughout the decade.

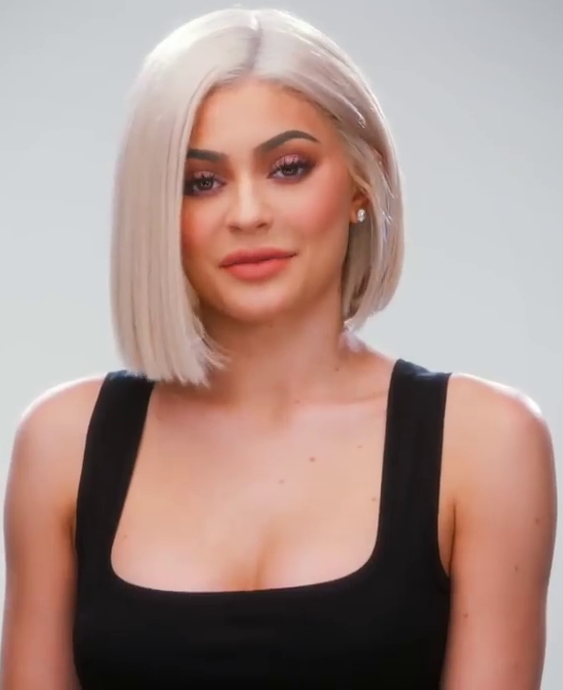
Influencer Kylie Jenner in 2017, whose makeup and fashion choices impacted trends social media.

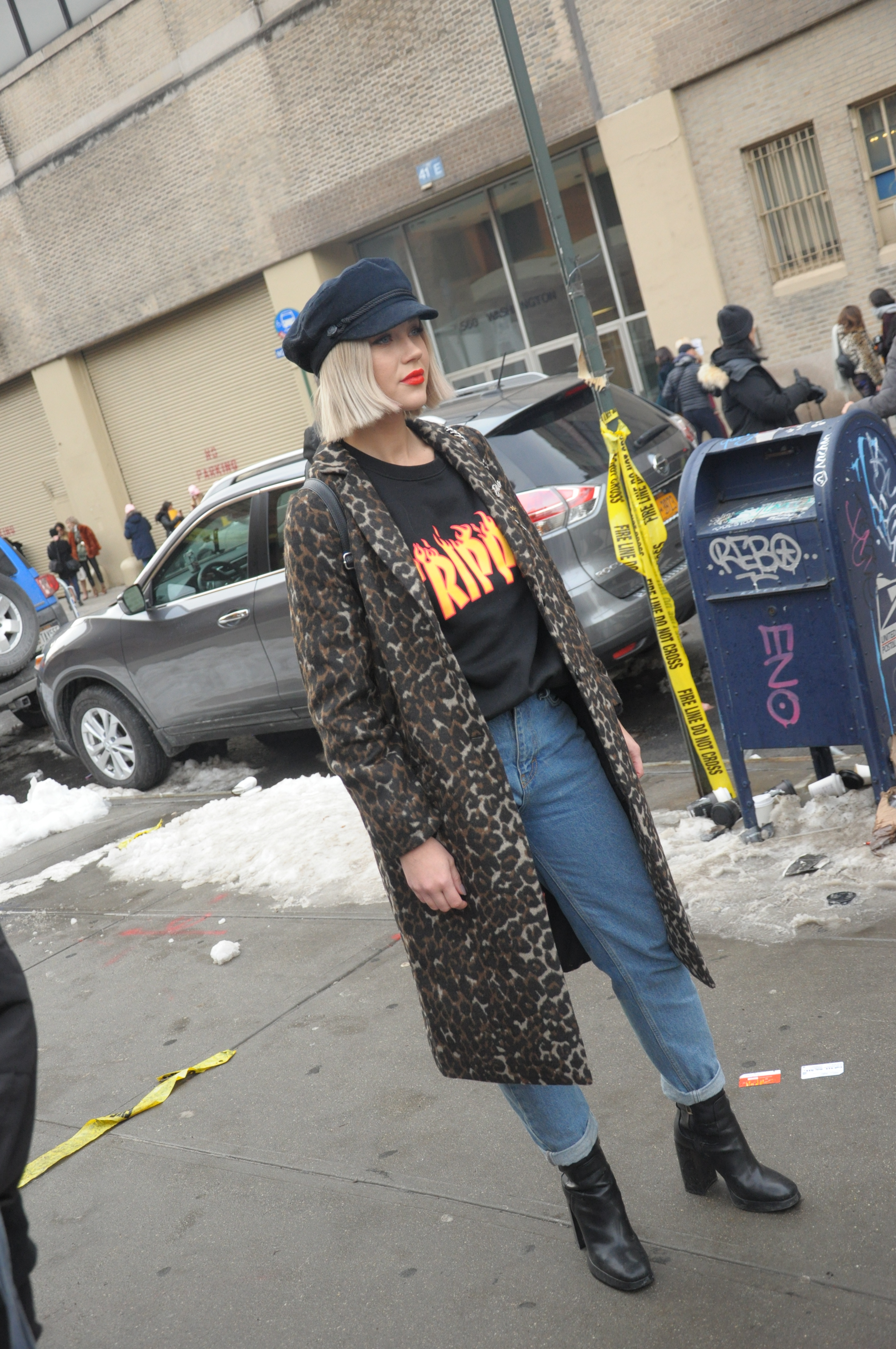
New York streetwear fashion showing off oversized layering and high-low styling in 2017.

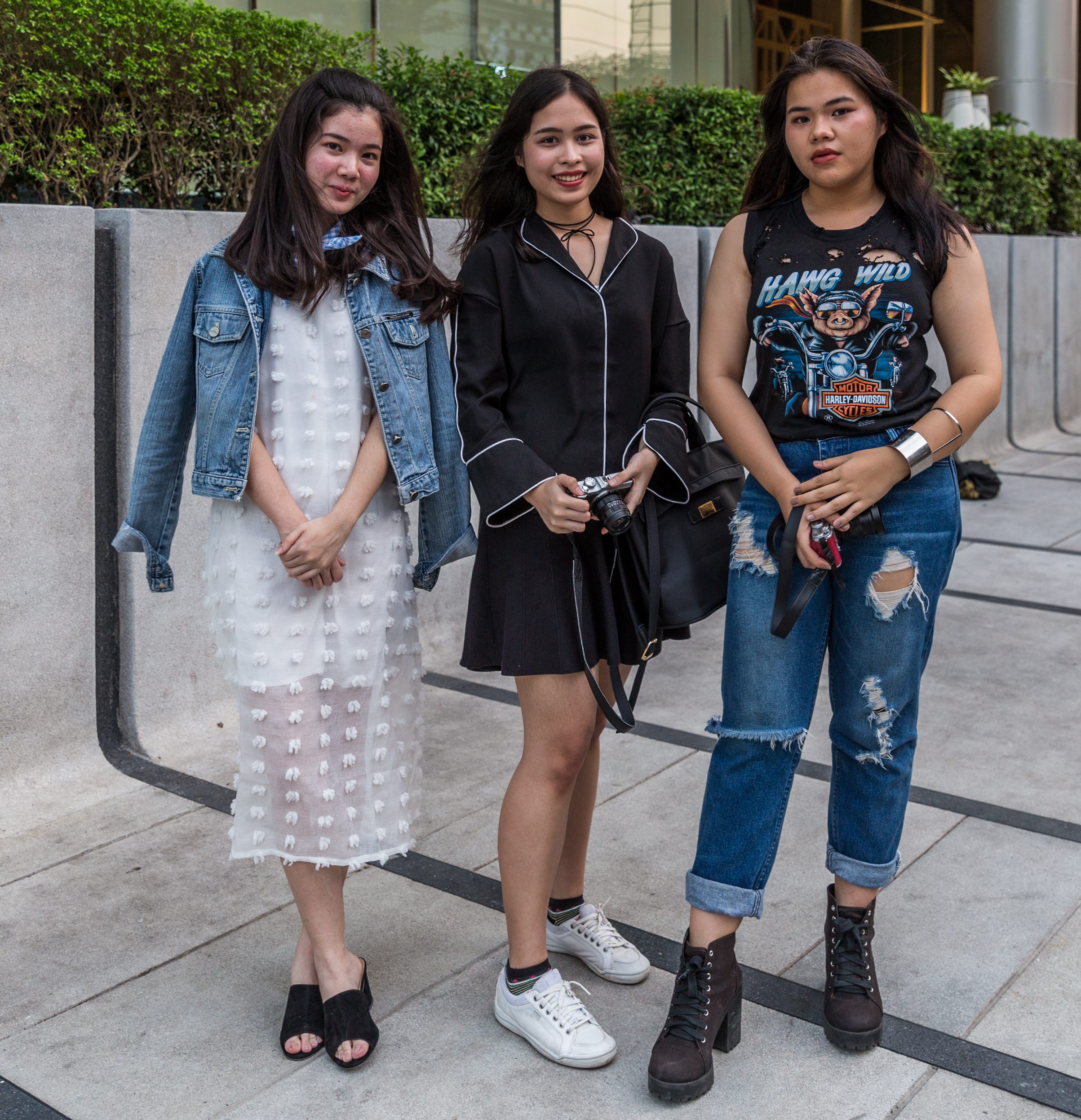
Bangkok streetwear in 2017, blending soft sheers with workwear inspired denim and ripped jeans.

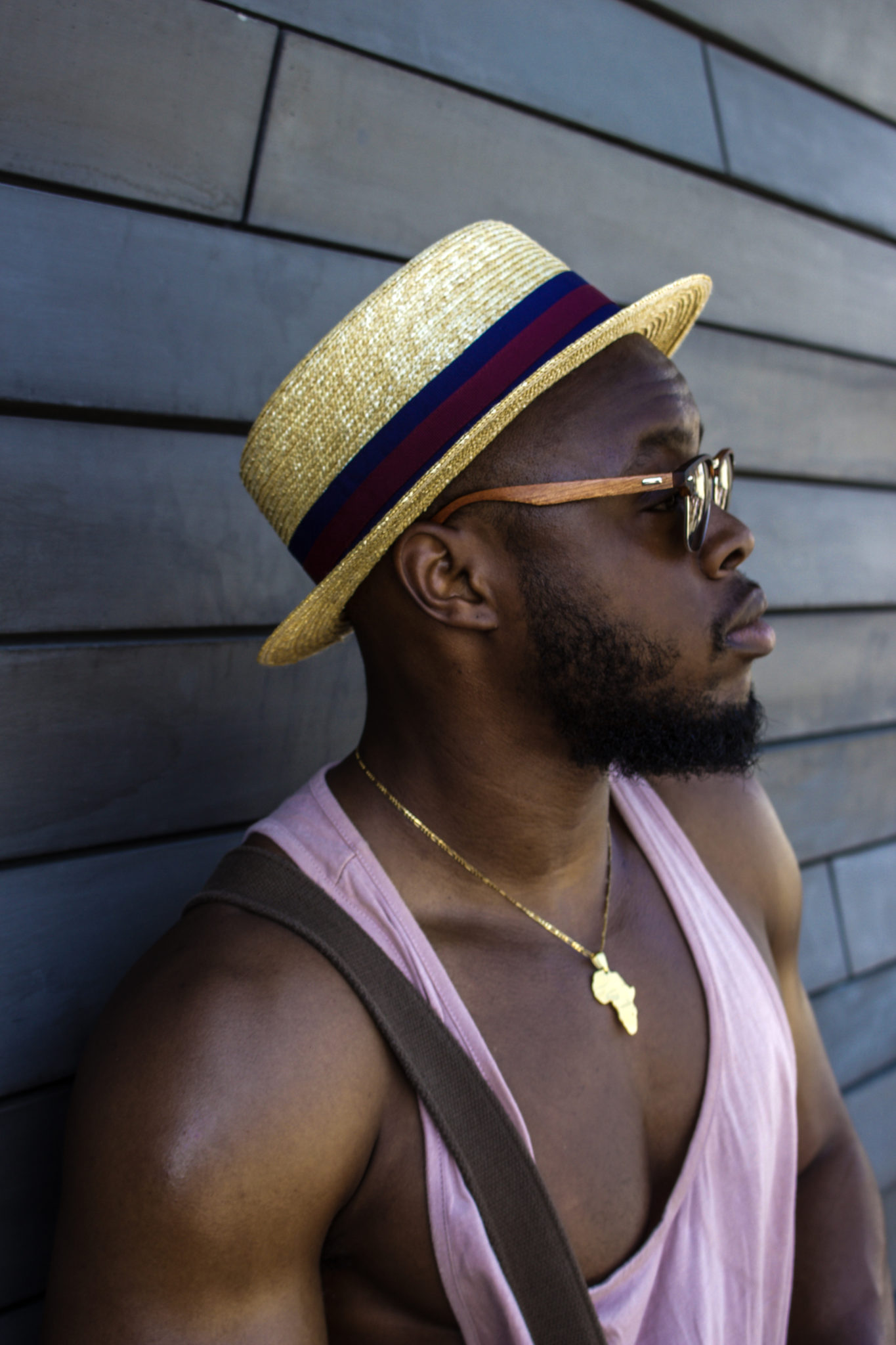
American man wearing a vintage style boater hat in 2017, showing the longevity of hipster style across the decade.

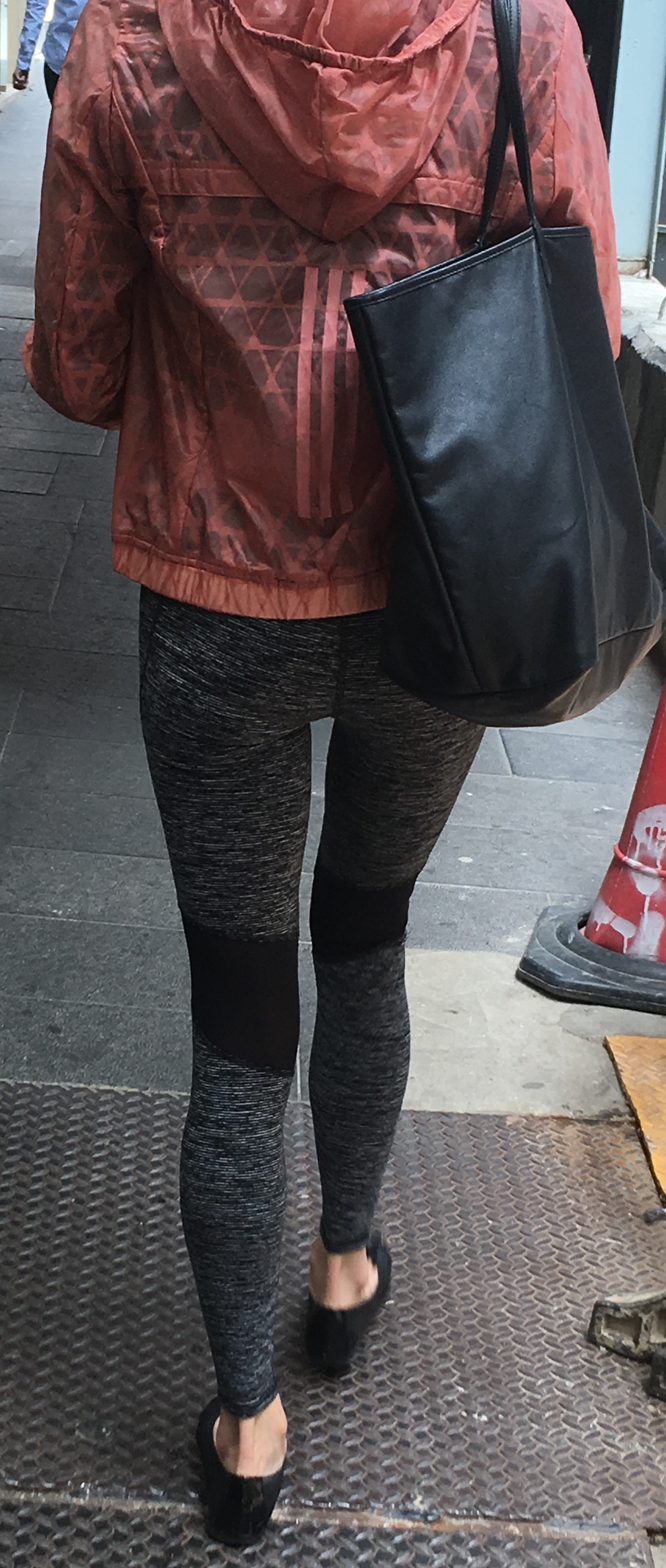
Athleisure fashion, 2017, with athletic bottoms and sneakers worn as casual streetwear by women and men alike.

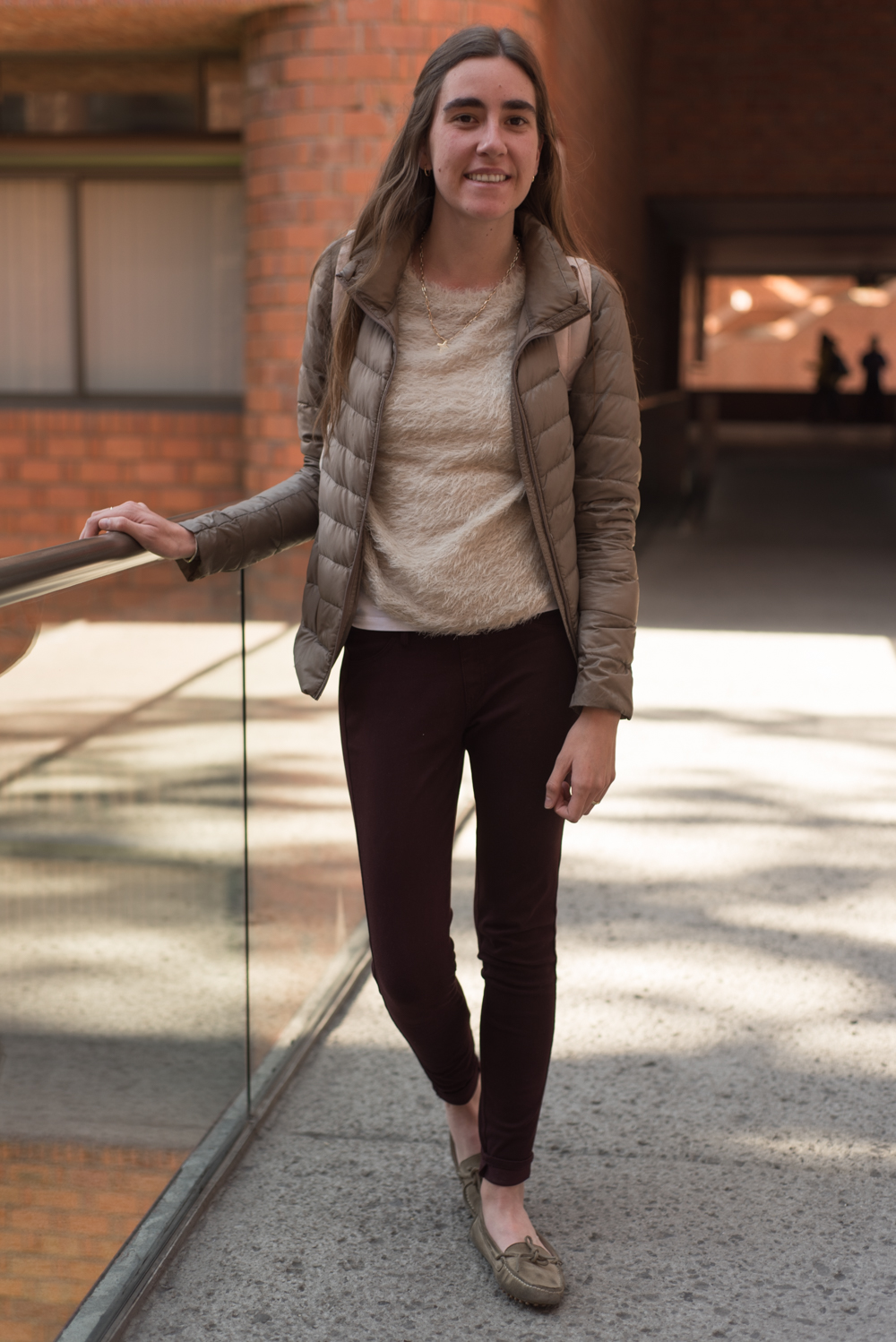
Mexican student wearing a casual outfit: a jacket, black jeans and loafers, 2017.

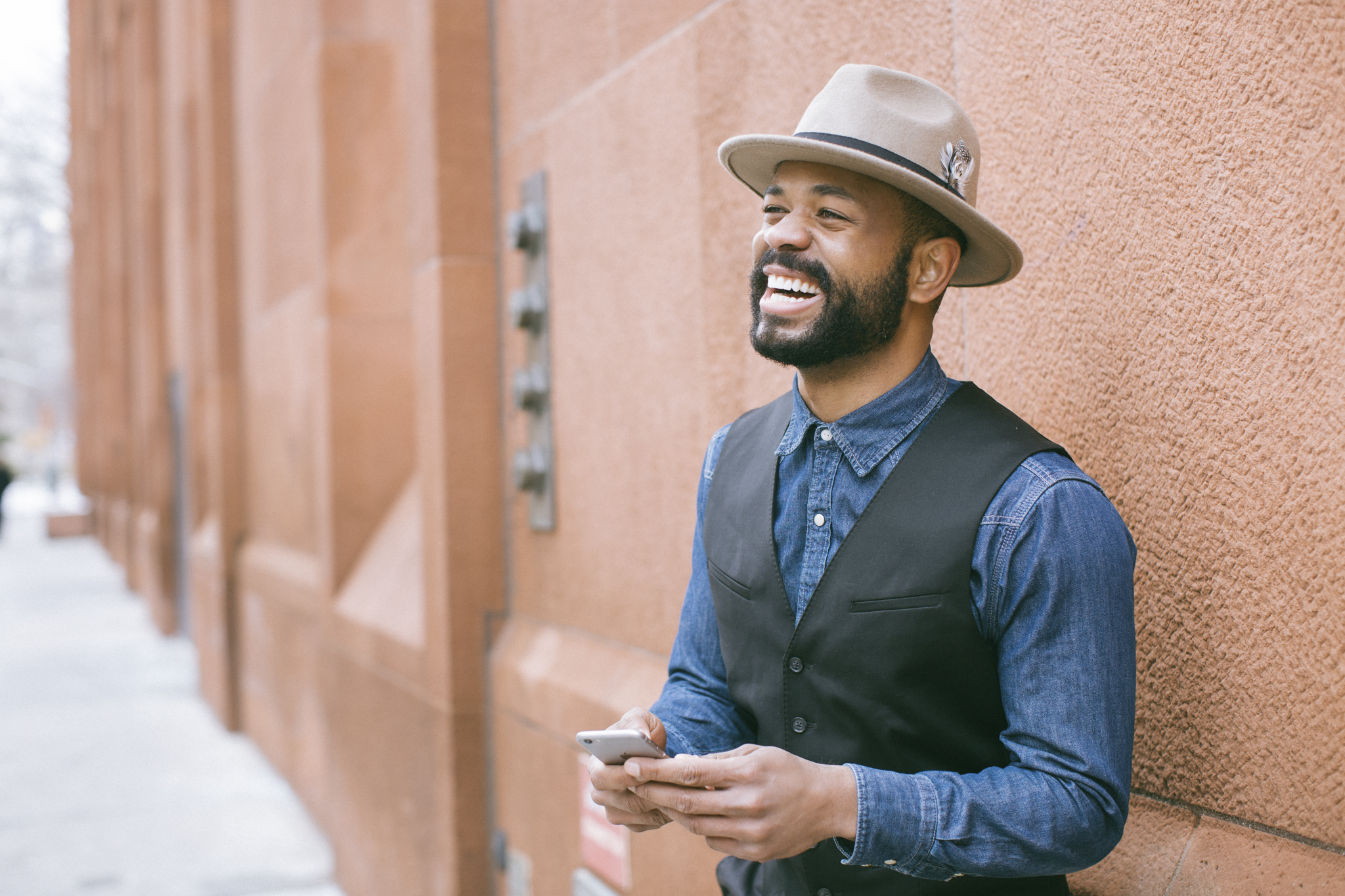
Man wearing a hipster fedora hat, 2017.

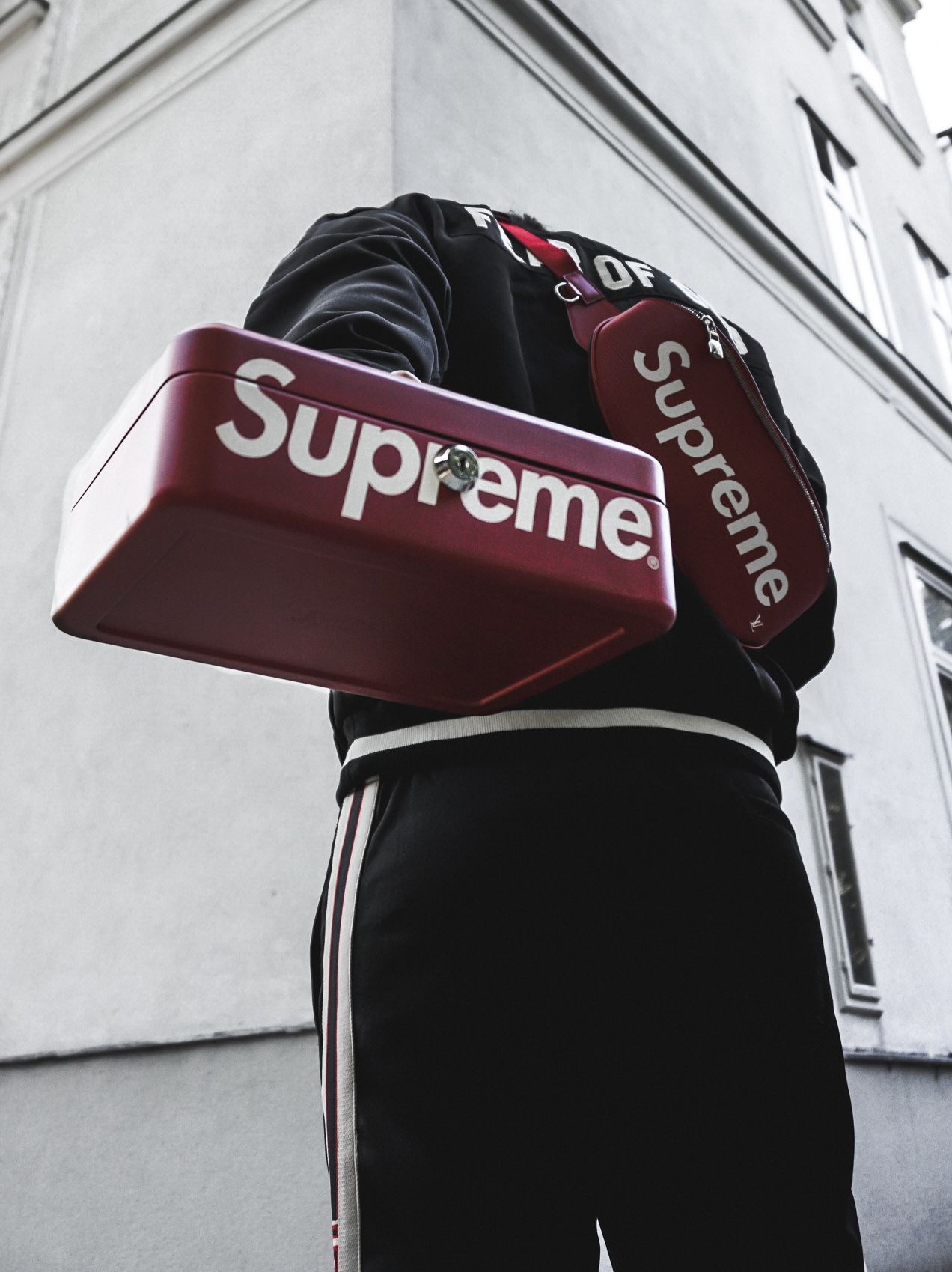
“Hypebeast” streetwear in Vienna, 2017, featuring Supreme-branded accessories and track pants, 2017

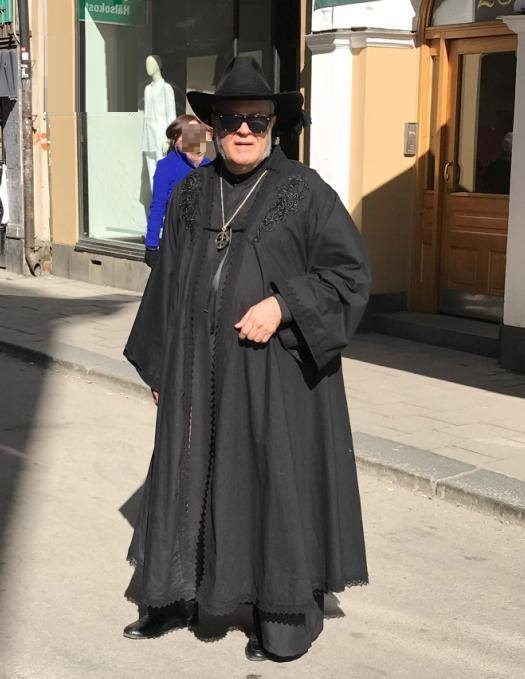
Robe and kaftan for slightly overweight gentleman in Götgatan of Stockholm, 2018

Egyptian man wearing a sports shirt and a hat as part of a globalized streetwear, 2019.

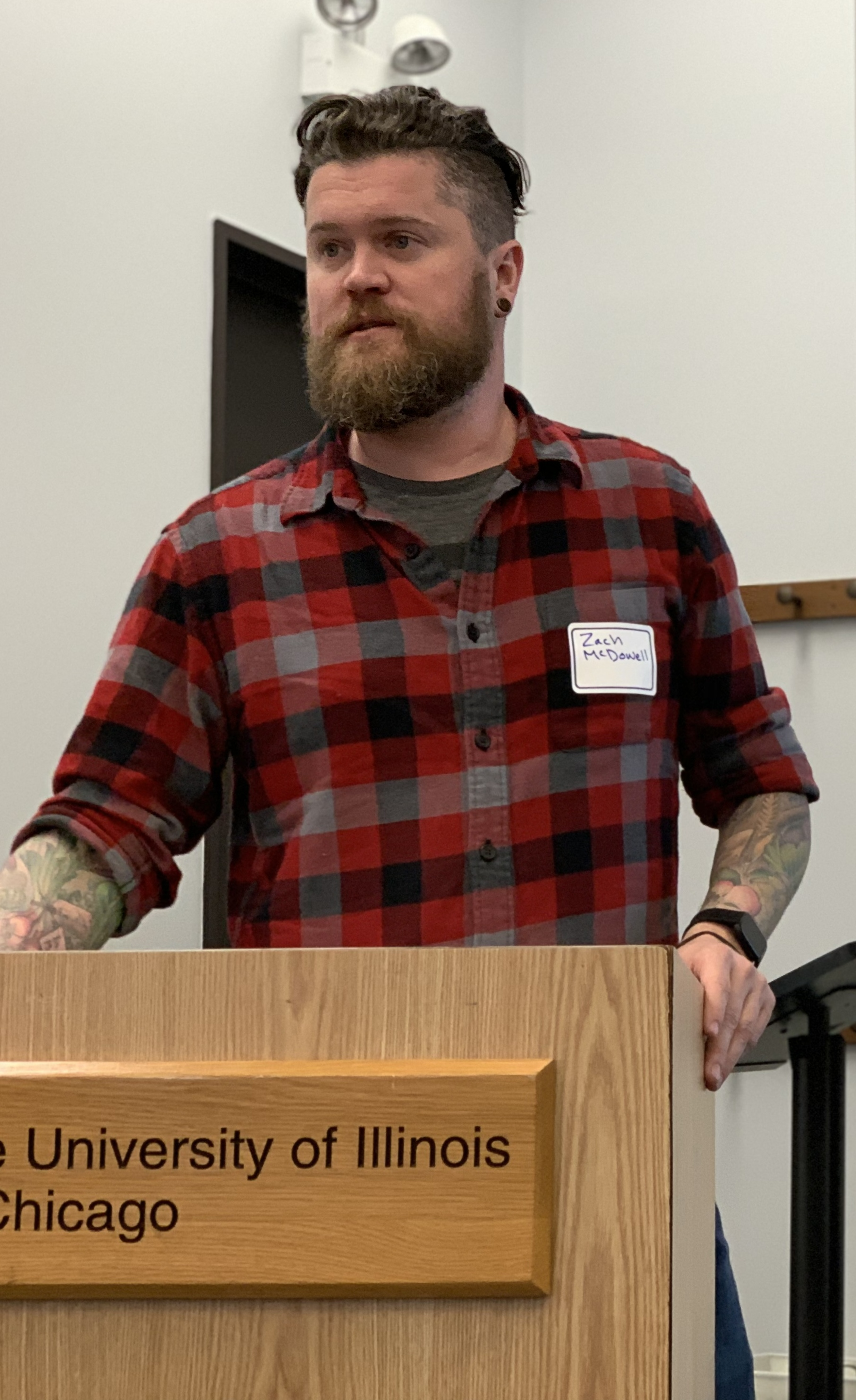
American man wearing a slim-fitting flannel shirt, a beard, and an undercut, 2019. Sleeve tattoos can be seen.

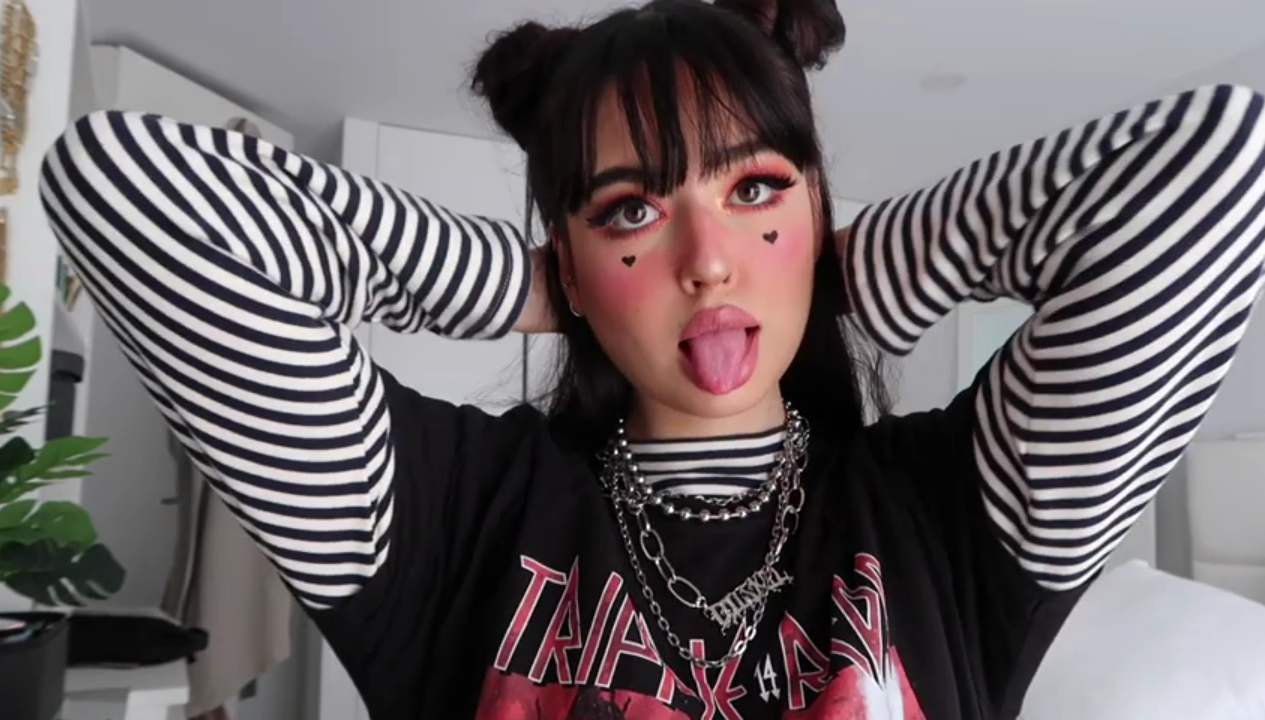
Stereotypical e-girl attire and makeup of 2019.

== See also ==
- 2000s in fashion
- 2010s
- 2020s in fashion
- Anti-fashion
- Fashion and clothing in the Philippines
- Fashion design
- Fashion in India
- History of Western fashion
- Indie culture
- Skate culture
- Vintage clothing
