= Braid (hairstyle) =

Hairstyle formed by interlacing three or more Strands

An Egyptian child with a "Lock of Youth" plait hairstyle

Braids (also referred to as plaits) are a hairstyle formed by interlacing three or more strands of hair. Braiding has been used to style and ornament human and animal hair for thousands of years world-wide in various cultures around the world. Braided hairstyles are used in many cultures as social signifiers for traits such as marital status, gender, social class, and age.

The simplest and most common version is a flat, solid, three-stranded structure. More complex patterns can be constructed from an arbitrary number of strands to create a wider range of structures. The structure is usually long and narrow with each component strand functionally equivalent in zigzagging forward through the overlapping mass of the others. Incorporating more hair as the braid progresses, either from the head or from separate wefts of hair, can create other styles such as knotless braids and French braids. Small items like beads and shells can also be incorporated into the braid.

== History ==
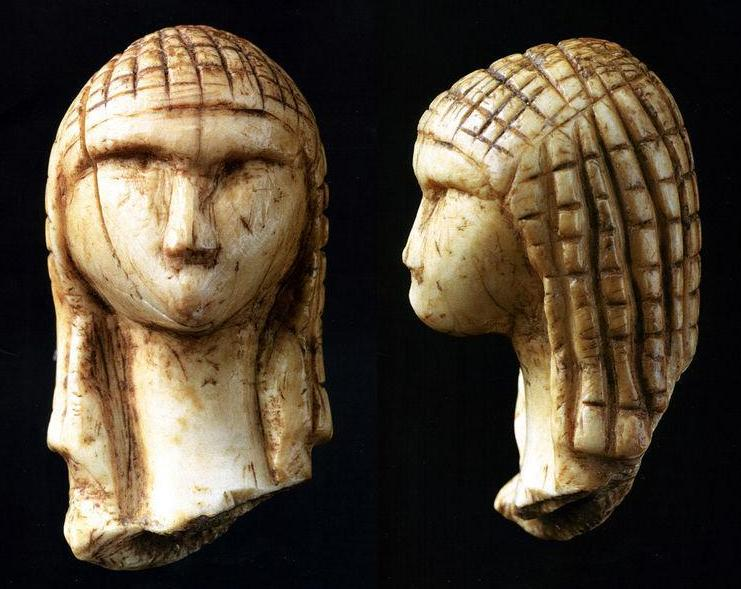
Front and side view of the Venus of Brassempouy, France (c. 23,000 BCE)

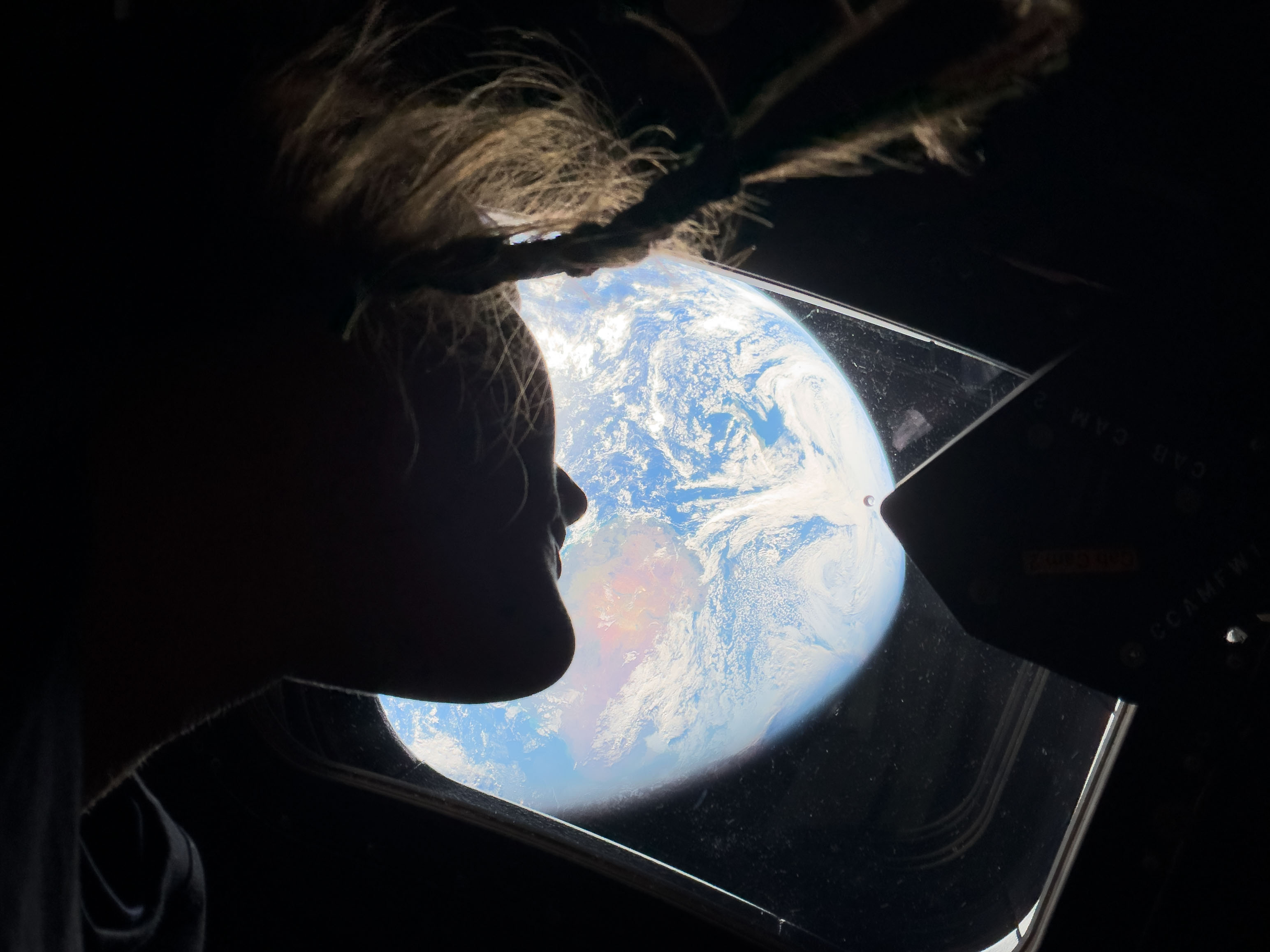
Christina Koch, astronaut of the 2026 Artemis II mission with a floating braid

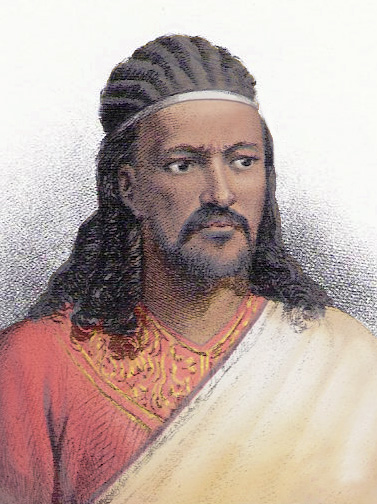
Tewodros II (c. 1818 – 1868 CE), Emperor of Ethiopia, depicted in Histoire de l'Ethiopie d'Axoum à la révolution (1998), wearing braided locks

The earliest known depiction of braiding may be the Venus of Willendorf, a female figurine unearthed in Austria which is estimated to have been made between about 28,000 and 25,000 BCE. It has been disputed whether the horizontal spiral ridges on the statue's head depict braided hair or some sort of a woven basket. The Venus of Brassempouy in France is estimated to be about 25,000 years old and ostensibly shows a braided hairstyle.

Various braided hairstyles have historically been common in cultures throughout the world. Braids of varying styles have been extant in Western Asia, the Indian sub-continent and China since the Bronze Age. Bog bodies in Northern Europe have been found wearing braided hairstyles from the Northern European Iron Age, and later still braided styles were found among the Celts, Iberians, Germanic peoples, Slavs and Vikings in northern, western, Eastern and southwestern Europe. The people of Ancient Egypt, Greece, and Rome all wore braids.

In some regions, a braid was a means of communication. At a glance, one individual could distinguish a wealth of information about another, whether they were married, mourning, or of age for courtship, simply by observing their hairstyle. Braids were a means of social stratification. Certain hairstyles were distinctive to particular ethnicities or nations. Other styles informed others of an individual's status in society. Braid patterns or hairstyles could indicate a person's community, age, marital status, wealth, power, social position, and religion.

Braiding is traditionally a social art. Because of the time it takes to braid hair, people have often taken time to socialize while braiding and having their hair braided. It begins with the elders making simple knots and braids for younger children. Older children watch and learn from them, start practicing on younger children, and eventually learn the traditional designs. This carries on a tradition of bonding between elders and the new generation.

There are a number of different types of braided hairstyles, including French braids, corn rows, and box braiding. Braided hairstyles may also be used in combination with or as an alternative to simpler bindings, such as ponytails or pigtails. Braiding may also be used to add ornamentation, such as beads or hair extensions, as in crochet braiding.

== Braiding by culture ==
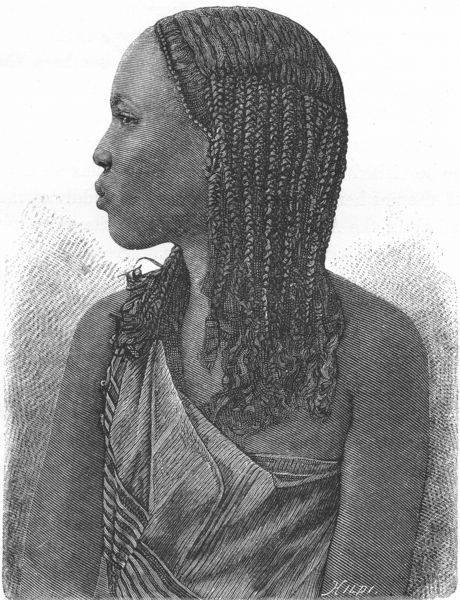
Traditional braided hairstyle of a Somali woman of the Ciise clan (c. 1878)

=== Africa ===
A number of braided styles originate from Africa, including cornrows, box braids, twists, and locs, with each ethnic group and region having distinct techniques and meanings. African people such as the Yoruba people of West Africa, Wolof people, Himba people of Namibia, Maasai people of Kenya have been braiding their hair for centuries. In many African ethnicities, hairstyles are unique and used to identify different ethnicities. There are a variety of African braiding styles. Braids were common in Ancient Egypt, and a variety of braid styles were popular for both men and women. The placement and style of braids served as an indicator of age and social status, and cutting said braids carried cultural significance. Braided hair was sometimes used as an offering at burial sites.

Braids are normally done tighter in black culture than in others, such as in cornrows or box braids. While this leads to the style staying in place for longer, it can also lead to initial discomfort. This is commonly accepted and managed through pain easing techniques. Some include pain killers, letting the braids hang low, and using leave-in-conditioner. Alternative braiding techniques like knotless braids, which incorporate more of a person's natural hair and place less tension on the scalp, can cause less discomfort. Braids are not usually worn year-round in Black culture; they are instead alternated with other hairstyles such as hair twists.

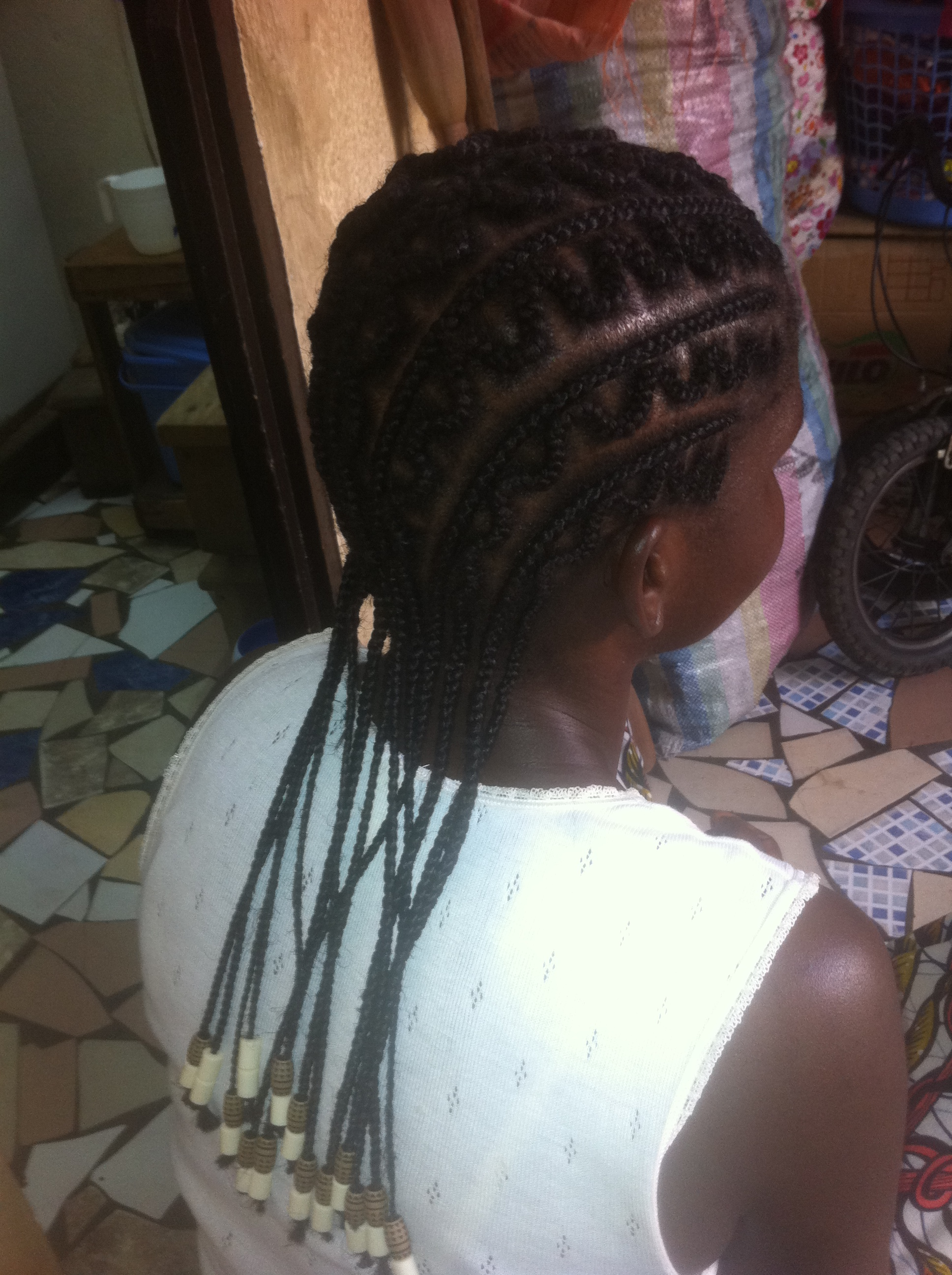
African braids style

Placement of braids can form a variety of specific styles and shapes such as mohawks, half updos, and side-swept cornrows. The use of different textures, lengths, and styles of extensions incorporated into the style can create variations like goddess braids, boho braids, and bora bora braids. Braids done with a person's own hair can be considered as part of the natural hair movement. Braids can also serve as the base for a sew-in, a style in which hair extensions are sewn onto close braids.

==== African diaspora ====
A number of braided hairstyles are closely associated with African Americans, who brought traditional African hairstyles with them to the Americas during the Atlantic slave trade. Cornrows, for example, originate from West Africa, but their English name refers to the fields of corn and sugarcane African slaves worked. Modern box braids resemble the chin-length braids of Ancient Egypt, but were popularized in a new, longer form by Black celebrities such as Janet Jackson in the 1993 film Poetic Justice and later by musicians like Beyoncé.

Black American hairstyles have been the subject of controversies around respectability, racism and cultural appropriation. On July 3, 2019, California became the first US state to prohibit discrimination over natural hair. Governor Gavin Newsom signed the CROWN Act into law, banning employers and schools from discriminating against Black hairstyles such as dreadlocks, braids, afros, and twists. Later in 2019, Assembly Bill 07797 became law in New York state; it "prohibits race discrimination based on natural hair or hairstyles."

=== The Americas ===
Braided hairstyles were widespread among many North American indigenous peoples, with traditions varying greatly from tribe to tribe. Pigtail braids date back to the fifth century among Native Americans. For example, among the Quapaw, young girls adorned themselves with spiral braids, while married women wore their hair loose. Among the Lenape, women wore their hair very long and often braided it. Among the Blackfoot, men wore braids, often on both sides behind the ear. The men of the Kiowa tribe often wrapped pieces of fur around their braids, called a hair drop. Among the Lakota, both men and women wore their hair in 2 braids with men's being typically longer than women's. Some had their hair wrapped in furs, typically bison, called a hair drop, some native groups of the Great Plains also had this hairstyle. During times of war, warriors would often have their hair unbraided as a sign of fearlessness.

Among the Maya, women had intricate hairstyles with two braids, while men had a single large braid that encircled the head.

=== Asia ===
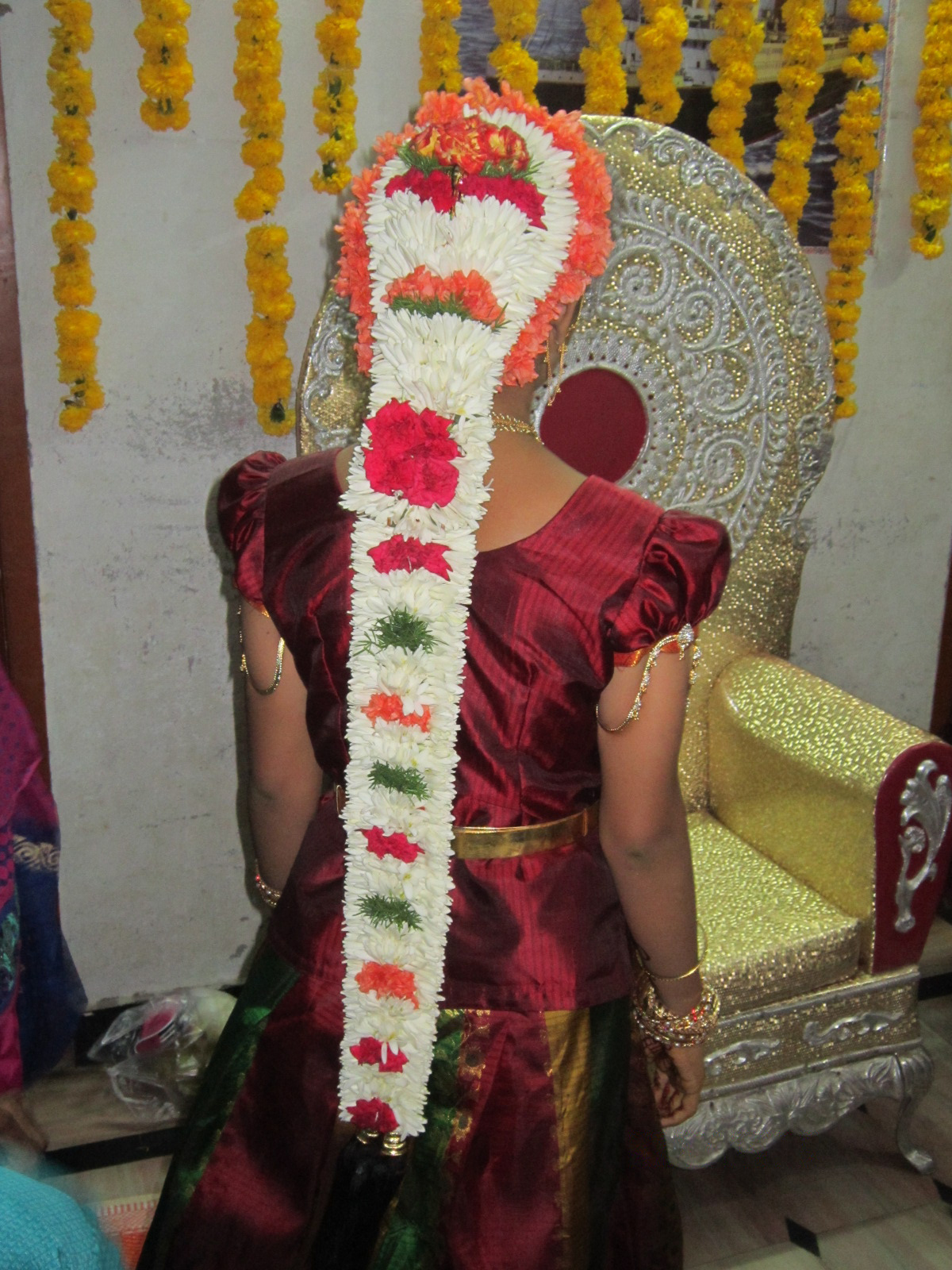
Traditional floral arrangement on braid in India

In India, young girls and women often wear long braided hair at the back of their neck. In the Upanishads, braided hair is mentioned as one of the primary charms of female seduction. Today, braiding is common in both rural and urban areas. Girls are seen in twin braids especially in schools, though now it is becoming less common. Young girls usually have one long braid. Married women have a bun or a braided bun.

A significant tradition of braiding existed in Mongolia, where it was traditionally believed that the human soul resided in the hair. Hair was only unbraided when death was imminent.

In Japan, the Samurai sported a high-bound ponytail (Chonmage), a hairstyle that is still common among Sumo wrestlers today. Japanese women wore various types of braids (三つ編み mitsuami) until the late 20th century because school regulations prohibited other hairstyles, leaving braids and the bob hairstyle as the main options for girls.

In China, girls traditionally had straight-cut bangs and also wore braids (辮子 biànzi). The Manchu men have historically braided their hair in the queue hairstyle, which involved shaving the forehead and sides and leaving a long braid at the back (剃髮易服 tìfà yìfú). After conquering Beijing in 1644 and establishing the Qing Dynasty, they forced the men of the subjugated Han Chinese to adopt this hairstyle as an expression of loyalty. The Han Chinese considered this a humiliation as they had never traditionally cut their hair due to Confucian customs. Anti-Qing rebels cut their queues to symbolize their resistance, including Mao Zedong. The last Qing emperor, Puyi, cut off his queue in 1922, 10 years after the dynasty fell, marking the end of this male hairstyle in China.

=== Europe ===
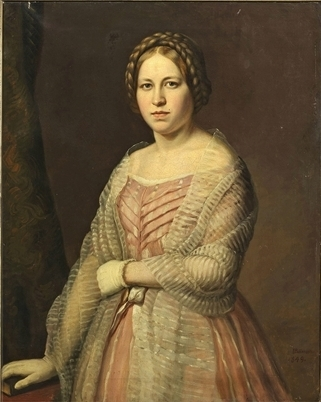
Portrait of a young lady by German artist Heinrich Pommerencke, showing the crown braid hairstyle

European braids have been a cultural phenomenon for thousands of years. In Ancient Greece, unmarried women wore their hair loose, and married women arranged their hair in a variety of elaborate styles incorporating braiding. Until the 5th century BCE, Greek men also wore long hair which was sometimes braided. The Caryatids are depicted with two-stranded braids.

Ancient Roman women wore their hair up, with lower class women wearing simple bun styles and higher-class women incorporating braids into intricate styles. Some statues depict a variety of braid styles including a traditional three-stranded braid and French braids.

Germanic cultures have also been known to have braids for centuries. The Psalter of Stuttgart in 820AD shows women with braided hair. The crown braid or halo braid hairstyle originates from Europe in the 11th century, though some sources indicate that it may date back to ancient Mesopotamia. Known in German as Gretchenfrisur (for Gretchen, Faust's love interest from the writing of Goethe) or Bauernkrone ("farmer crown"), the style is associated with German folk clothing. In the early 2000s, the hairdo gained some attention when the Ukrainian politician Yulia Tymoshenko wore it.

Hairwork is the art of crafting ornamental patterns from human hair, which was used as jewelry or sometimes home decoration. The braided hair served as a memento of the person from which it grew, such as in mourning jewelry.

== Braid-cutting ==
The cutting of braids is a powerful symbol in many cultures. The forced cutting of braids has also been used as a form of punishment.

In Qing Dynasty China, cutting the braided queue was a symbol of resistance against Manchu rule. Under the Republic of China, men were required to cut their braids.

In many Native American tribes, one's braided hair is cut when mourning the loss of a loved one. Under the Canadian Indian residential school system, Indigenous children's braids were often cut to erase their cultural origins. Cutting braids has been used as a form of protest against the appropriation of Native and First Nations land.

In 2017, a spate of braid-cutting attacks occurred in Northern India. No explanation has emerged for the attacks.

=== Sexuality and psychoanalysis ===
In older psychiatric literature, there are occasional references to fetishists who, in order to possess the desired object, would cut off female braids. For example, Swiss psychiatrist Auguste Forel described the case of a braid-cutter in Berlin in 1906, who was found in possession of 31 braids. Richard von Krafft-Ebing had previously explored a deeper understanding of hair fetishism in the late 19th century.

In psychoanalytic literary interpretation, authors have continued to explore braid-cutters. Notably, an episode in Ernest Hemingway's novel For Whom the Bell Tolls has aroused considerable interest. Sigmund Freud had interpreted hair-cutting as a symbolic castration in Totem and Taboo (1913). Some authors later followed him in seeing the braid as a phallic symbol. Others have interpreted braids as a symbol of virginity and the unbraiding or cutting of the braid as a symbol of defloration.

== In animals ==
Braiding is also used to prepare horses' manes and tails for showing, often for show jumping, polo and dressage. Braiding horse hair can sometimes be beneficial since it can protect manes and tails from damage.

== See also more braiding techniques ==
- African hair threading
- Box braids
- Braid
- Koroba
- List of hairstyles
- Shuku
