= Box braids =

Hair braids which are characterized by "boxy" or square-shaped hair divisions

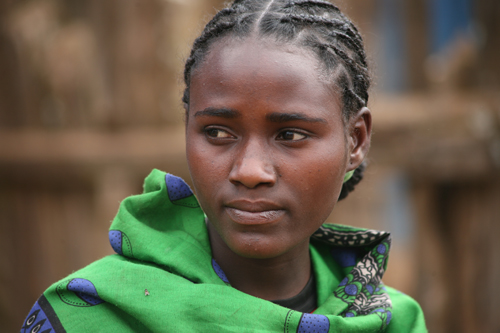
Box braids in Ethiopia

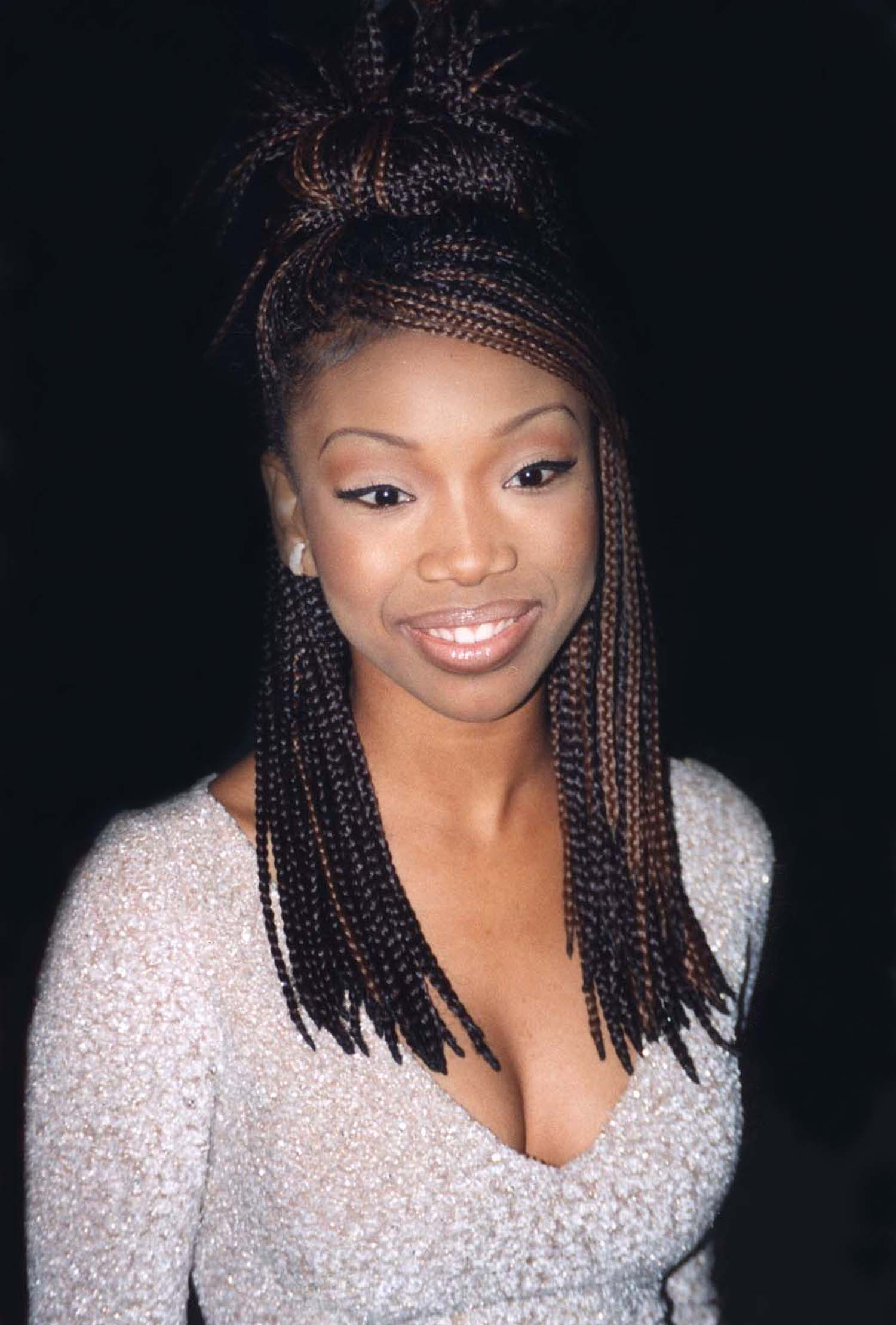
American singer/actress Brandy Norwood with box braids.

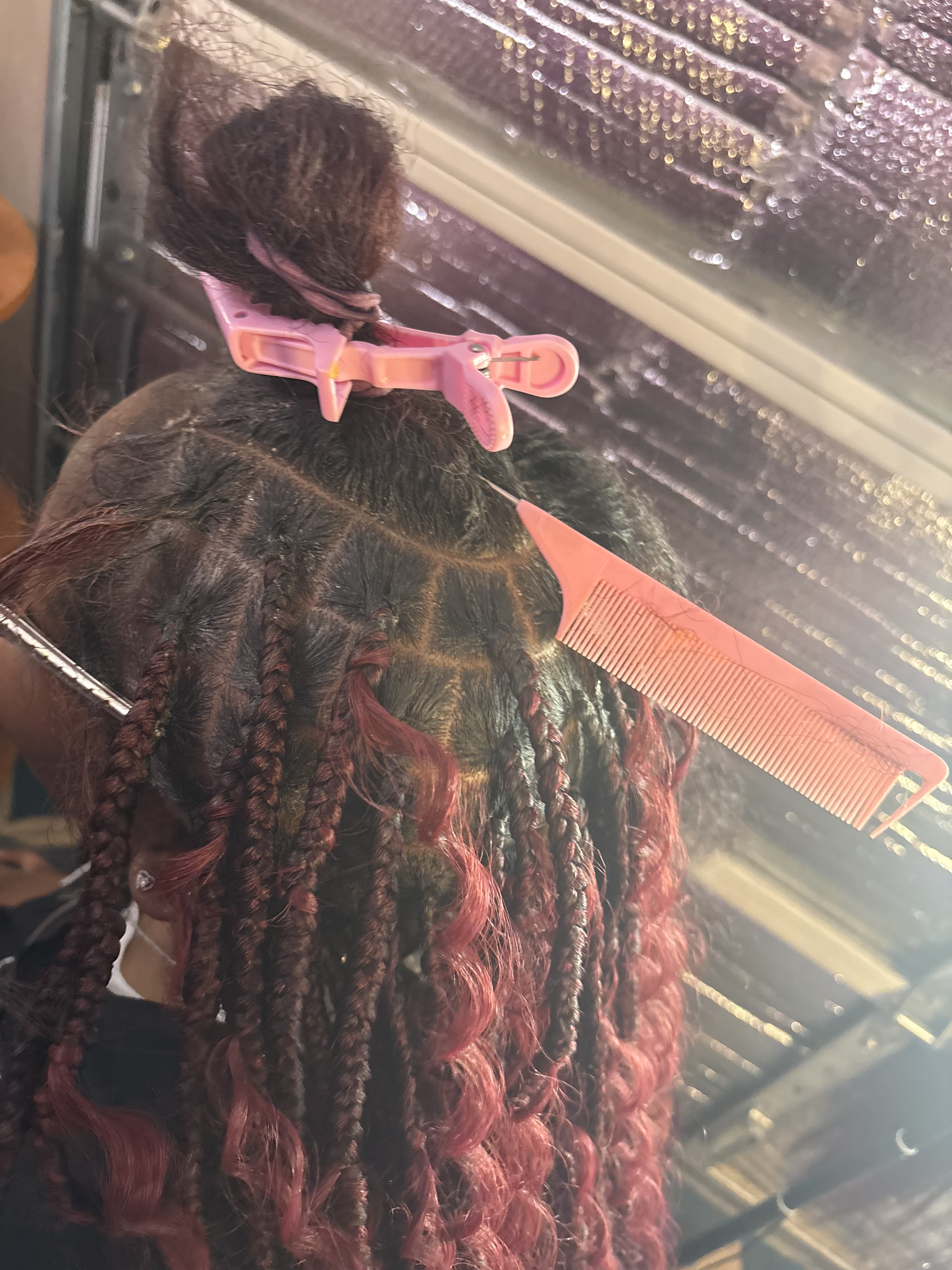
Box Braids where replaced with knotless braids for less tension

Box braids are a type of hair-braiding style that is predominantly popular among Black Africans and the African diaspora. This type of hairstyle is a "protective style" (a style which can be worn for a long period of time to let natural hair grow and protect the ends of the hair) and is "boxy", consisting of square-shaped hair divisions. Box braids are generally installed by using synthetic hair which helps to add thickness as well as helping the natural hair that is in the braid. Because they are not attached to the scalp like other similar styles such as cornrows, box braids can be styled in a number of different ways. The installation process of box braids can be lengthy, but once installed they can last for six to eight weeks. They are known for being easy to maintain.

== History ==
Hair-braiding styles were used to help differentiate tribes, locations, and also possibly a symbol of wealth and power due to the amount of effort that went into styling braids. Box braids were not given a specific name until the 1990s when popularized by R&B musician Janet Jackson, but have been used for years. This style of braiding comes from the Eembuvi braids of Namibia or the chin-length bob braids of the women of the Nile Valley from over 3,000 years ago. In the Mbalantu tribe of Namibia, braiding was an important social practice. Older women would gather with their girls and teach them how to braid. Box braids are also commonly worn by the Khoisan people of South Africa and the Afar people in the horn of Africa. In Africa, braid styles and patterns have been used to distinguish tribal membership, marital status, age, wealth, religion and social ranking. In some countries of Africa, the braids were used for communication. In some Caribbean islands, braid patterns were used to map routes to escape slavery. Layers of finely chopped tree bark and oils can be used to support the hairstyle. Human hair was at one point wefted into fiber wig caps made of durable materials like wool and felt for reuse in traditional clothing as well as different rituals. Cowry shells, jewels, beads and other material items adorned box braids of older women alluding to their readiness to have daughters, emulation of wealth, high priesthood and any other classifications.

== Cultural association and value ==
Hair was and is a very important and symbolic part of different African communities. Africans believed that hair could help with divine communication as it was the elevated part of one's body. Hair styling was entrusted only to close relatives, as it was explained that if a strand fell into the hands of an enemy, harm could come to the hair's owner. Members of royalty would often wear elaborate hairstyles as a symbol of their stature, and those in mourning, usually women, would pay some attention to their hair during the period of grieving. Hair was seen as a symbol of fertility, as thick, long tresses and neat, clean hair symbolised ability to bear healthy children. Elaborate patterns were done for special occasions like weddings, social ceremonies or war preparations. People belonging to a tribe could easily be identified by another tribe member with the help of a braid pattern or style.

== Box braids in the US military ==
The U.S. Army has strong regulations and restrictions on hairstyles for both men and women. In 2014, the army updated its policies because the old regulations were too restrictive for African-American women. Army policy originally considered African American women's natural hair "not neat" and deemed protective hairstyles "unprofessional". In the newer regulations, "twists, cornrows and braids can be up to 1/2 inch [13 mm] in diameter. The previous maximum was a diameter of approximately 1/4 inch [6 mm]". This gives more opportunity to wear protective styles.

Box braids can be worn by members of the US Army as long as they show no more than 3/8 of the scalp. The parting must be square or rectangular shape. The ends of the braids must be secured. Once the newly grown natural hair outside of the braid, also known as new growth, reaches 1/2 inch [13 mm], the style must be redone.

Similar regulations apply for styles like dreadlocks, flat twists, and braids with natural hair. The hairstyles must not interfere with the wear of uniform or covers (uniform hats). Though synthetic hair for box braids exists in multiple colors, the military dictates that enlisted women must have box braids in natural hair colors without any additional jewelry like hairclips or beads.

== Medium box braids ==
Medium box braids are a popular hairstyle within the African and African American communities. They involve parting the hair into individual square-shaped sections, and then each section is braided from the scalp to the ends. These braids are termed 'medium' due to their thickness, which is typically about the width of a pencil to that of a felt tip marker.

=== Characteristics ===
The medium size of these braids strikes a balance between the delicate appearance of smaller braids and the more pronounced look of jumbo braids. They are versatile in length, often extending just beyond the wearer's natural hair length, and can be styled in various ways including buns, ponytails, and more.

=== Styling and maintenance ===
As a protective hairstyle, medium box braids can safeguard the hair from environmental factors and styling stress. They require routine maintenance, including scalp hydration and proper cleansing, to maintain the health of the hair and scalp. These braids can be kept in for several weeks before they need to be redone.

== Difficulties ==
Tight or heavy hairstyles, such as long box braids, can also cause an external-traction headache, previously called a ponytail headache. Overly tight braids may cause traction alopecia. Looser braids have a lower risk than tight braids or other styles, such as cornrows and dreadlocks.

== See also ==
- African hair threading
- Braid (hairstyle)
- Cornrows
- Shuku
- koroba
- Dreadlocks
- French braid
- List of hairstyles
