= Protective hairstyle =

Hairstyle that tucks the hair away and keeps it free from manipulation

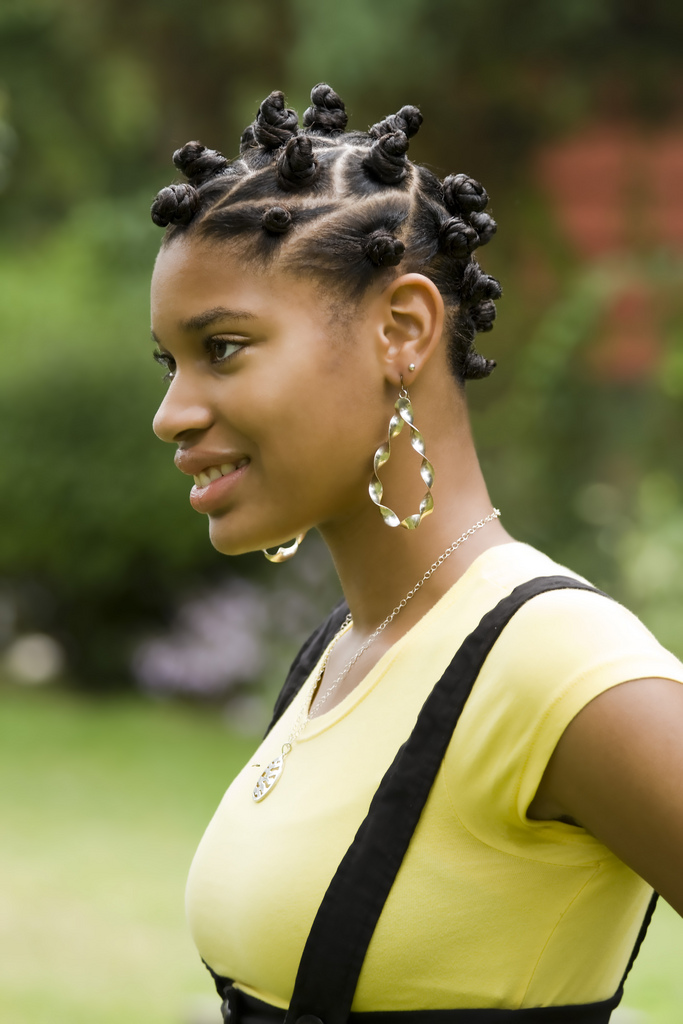
Woman with Bantu knots hairstyle, a type of protective hairstyle

A protective hairstyle is a term predominantly used to describe hairstyles suitable for Afro-textured hair whose purpose is to reduce the risk of hairs breaking off short. These hairstyles are designed to minimize manipulation and exposure of the hair to environmental elements. Factors such as extreme temperatures, humidity, and precipitation can adversely affect hair health. Protective hairstyles are beneficial in mitigating these effects by keeping the hair tucked away and reducing its exposure to potentially damaging conditions.

Common types of protective hairstyles include braids, wigs, locs, and twists. These styles not only are functional in protecting the hair from weather-related damage but also aid in retaining hair length and promoting growth. The adoption of protective hairstyles can lead to a reduction in hair tangles and knots. Additionally, these styles can offer respite to the hair from constant styling, pulling, and combing, thus contributing to overall hair health.

Protective hairstyles have also been recognized for their cultural and social significance. They play a role in the expression of cultural identity and can be seen as a form of artistic and personal expression. The versatility and diversity of these hairstyles reflect the rich cultural heritage associated with Afro-textured hair.

Afro-textured hair is often prone to breakage or damage from the elements; protective hairstyles aim to guard against this. However protective hairstyles sometimes involve tension at the scalp, like braids with weaves and wigs, and can cause thinning of the hairline. They may also prevent hair from growing, which, if prolonged, may lead to traction alopecia. This happens mainly in cases of untreated hair that is not properly maintained with the necessary oils and products.

Protective styles require styling hair for a few days and using the correct styles and products. Depending on the hairstyle and how well it is taken care of, protective hairstyles can last between two weeks and two months.

In the United States, some jurisdictions have banned discrimination based on hairstyles associated with African Americans, including protective hairstyles. In 2007, radio host Don Imus caused an outrage when he called the Rutgers University women's basketball team "nappy-headed hoes." This led to cancellations of his future show. In 2020, Noah Cyrus made a comment about "nappy hair," which led to many controversies. She later on apologized through social media, saying she didn't know the context and history behind the terms she had used. A federal bill called the Crown Act of 2022 (Creating a Respectful and Open World for Natural Hair Act of 2022) was passed in the House of Representatives with the intention to prohibit race-based discrimination based on hairstyles and hair texture. In present time Black women have created blogs and YouTube channels to embrace their hairstyles in positive ways.

== History ==
=== Culture ===
Protective hairstyles, including various forms of braids, hold significant cultural importance in African history, with their origins tracing back thousands of years. These hairstyles are not only a reflection of aesthetic preferences but also carry deep cultural symbolism. Intricate patterns and styles in braiding often symbolize strength and creativity within African tribes and communities. Historically, braids served as distinguishing markers of tribal affiliation and were indicative of an individual's wealth, religious beliefs, age, marital status, and ethnicity.

In contemporary contexts, braids and similar hairstyles continue to be significant, often viewed as rites of passage and modes of self-expression, particularly among women of color. However, issues of hair discrimination and bias present challenges. Globally, women often feel compelled to alter their natural hairstyles to conform to societal norms, especially in professional settings. This includes changing hair from its natural state to styles perceived as more acceptable, such as straightening curly hair for job interviews.

=== Slavery ===
At the wake of slavery, many women and men from Africa were forced to shave their heads, stripping them of not only their hair but also their culture and humanity. Before that, many slaves used their braiding hairstyles as maps of the land and storage for small grains and nuts. With this, many laws were created to prohibit braids and other cultural and protective hairstyles. These laws were not overturned until the Black Power Movement in the 60s and 70s. Even after the laws were overturned, many still faced discrimination due to their hair type and hairstyles. This had stripped many people of the use of their braids as a form of culture to the use of braids as function; to keep hair manageable. Many styles were simplified and sometimes they were a struggle to maintain, not having proper access to products and tools. This led to many people using substances like kerosene to moisturize their hair. Later, cultural movements would bring back this sense of culture in wearing these protective hairstyles. The word nappy has been used to reference the "frizzy texture" of African American hair since the 1880s.

Braids and cornrows were also used to escape slavery. Since slaves were not allowed to learn how to read or write, another method of communication was necessary. Thus, came the use of cornrows to draw out maps and pass messages to escape slavery. This method was even used within the Underground Railroad. Additionally, rice and seeds would be woven into the braids in order to grow food after they had escaped.

== Preparation and maintenance ==
=== Preparation ===
Before adopting a protective hairstyle, the hair and scalp are thoroughly washed. Most protective styles are left in for weeks at a time, and cleansing rids hair of product, dirt and oil buildup. (The hair and head are also washed while the hairstyle is in place.) A sulfate-free shampoo and gentle motions while shampooing are recommended because rough washing can cause friction and lead to breakage. To prevent water damage and restore oils and moisture into the hair after washing, the next necessary step is to use a deep conditioner and sometimes a leave-in conditioner. These conditioners can be paired with additional oils to ensure healthy hair and minimize breakage before, during and after using protective hairstyles to manage hair.

=== Maintenance ===
After the hair is installed, there are many ways to maintain the health of the hair and the style. One of these ways is to wrap hair before sleeping in satin or silk to minimize friction and frizz created from bedding. A lightweight hair gel can also be added while wrapping hair to further reduce the creation of frizz and flyaways. With the scalp being exposed, it is very important to clean it periodically with shampoo diluted with water. After this and throughout wearing the hairstyles, it is necessary to moisturize the scalp after washing and moisturize the hair regularly. This can be done with many types of oils and leave-in conditioners.

=== Protective hairstyles and travel ===
The adaptability of protective hairstyles becomes particularly relevant for travelers transitioning between diverse climates. Changing weather conditions can pose various challenges to hair health. In colder climates, dry and frigid air increases the risk of hair breakage and dryness, while warm and humid conditions can lead to frizz and discomfort. Protective styles such as wigs, braids, twists, and updos with scarves offer practical solutions for these challenges, combining adaptability, ease of maintenance, and style. Wigs provide versatility, braids like box braids and cornrows protect natural hair from the elements, twists offer chic styling options, and scarves in updos add both protection and fashion flair in varying climates.

Maintenance and care of hair also vary depending on the climate. In colder regions, focus on hydration and protecting the ends from breakage is essential, whereas in warmer climates, using products to combat humidity and keep the scalp clean becomes a priority. These considerations are vital for travelers who wish to maintain healthy and stylish hair while adapting to different environmental conditions.

== Limitations ==
Protective hairstyles are specifically intended to reduce hair breakage, but, if placed inappropriately, they can result in traction alopecia (hairs pulled out from the root, rather than broken off midway) and external-traction headaches (pain from overly tight or heavy styles).

Missouri congresswoman Cori Bush described in an NPR interview her hair decisions for her first days in Congress: "I was thinking, you know, I needed a protective style but something that would be easy because also I didn't have a hair stylist in D.C.", she said.

== See also ==
- African hair threading
- Box braids
