= Cornrows =

Style of hair braiding

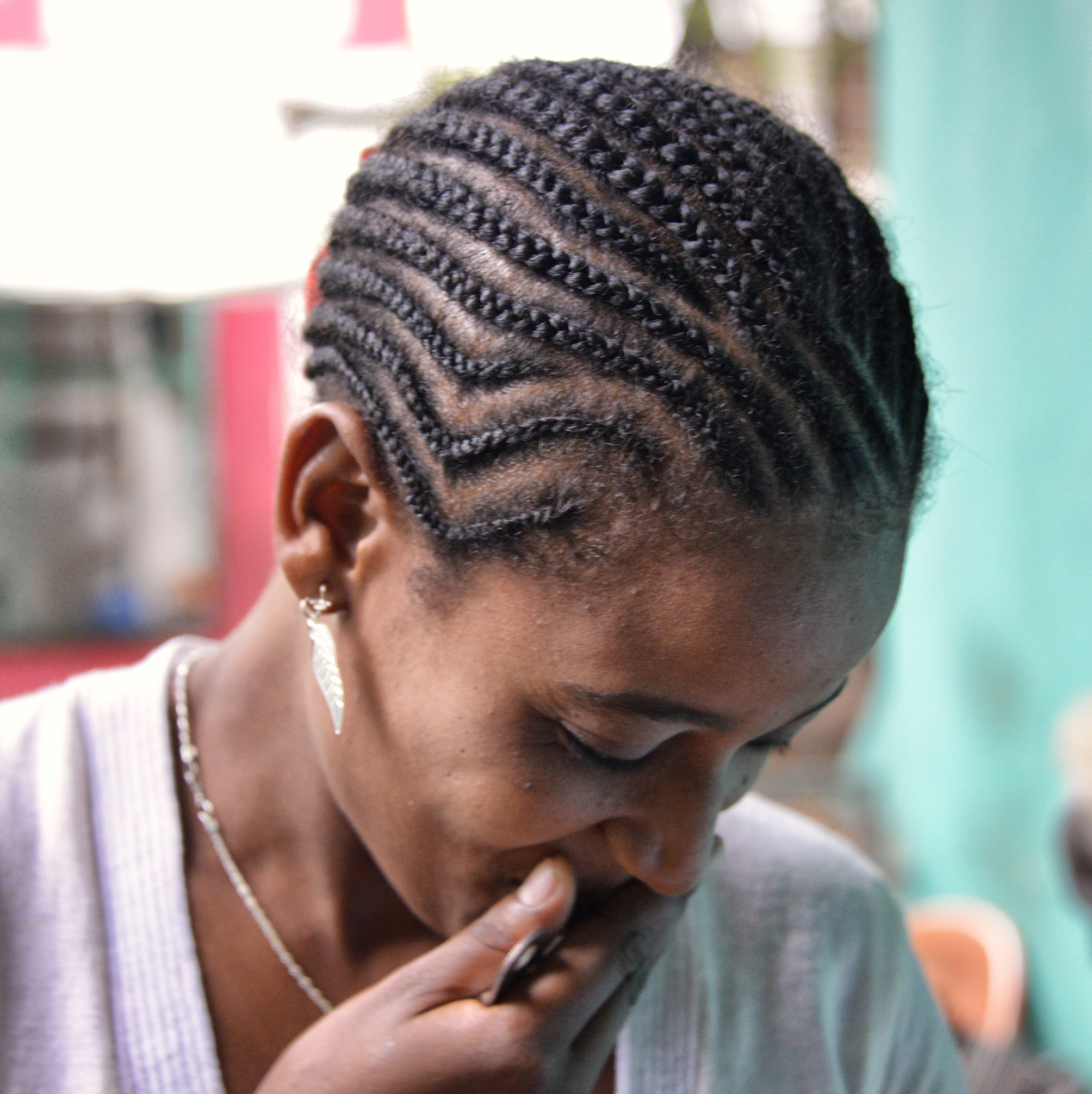
A woman with cornrows

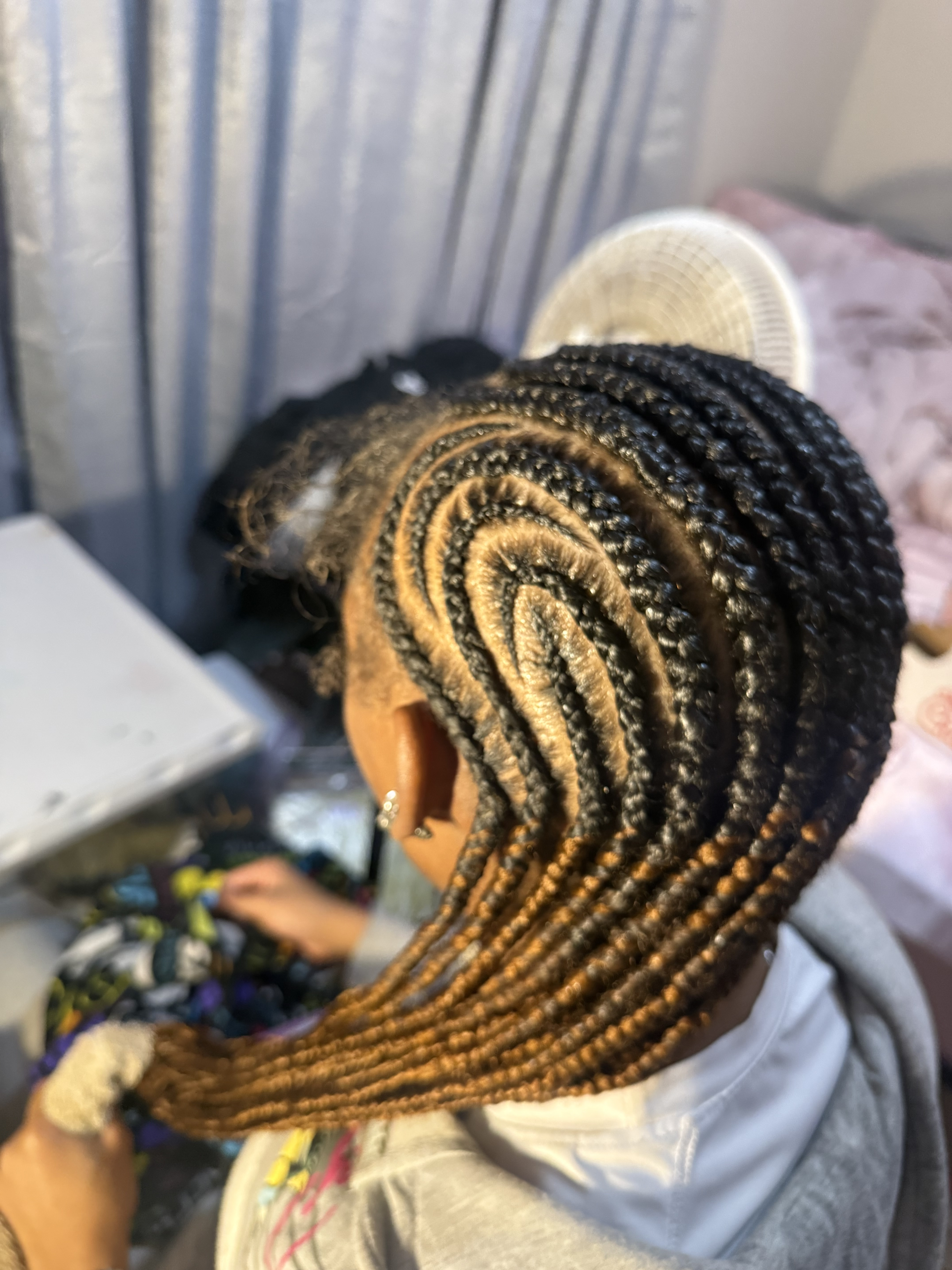
A woman with cornrows

Cornrows (also called canerows in the Caribbean) are a style of three-strand braids in which the hair is braided very close to the scalp, using an underhand, upward motion to make a continuous, raised row. Cornrows are often done in simple, straight lines, as the term implies, but they can also be styled in elaborate geometric or curvilinear designs. They are considered a traditional hairstyle of African braiding practice in many African cultures, as well as in the African diaspora. They are distinct from, but may resemble, box braids, Dutch braids, melon coiffures, and other forms of plaited hair, and are typically tighter than braids used in other cultures.

The name cornrows or canerows refers to the layout of crops in corn and sugarcane fields in the Americas and Caribbean, where enslaved Africans were displaced during the Atlantic slave trade. According to Black folklore, cornrows were often used to communicate on the Underground Railroad and by Benkos Biohó during his time as a slave in Colombia. They often serve as a form of Black self-expression, especially among African Americans, but have been stigmatized in some cultures. Cornrows are traditionally called "kolese" or "irun didi" in Yoruba, and are often nicknamed "didi braids" in the Nigerian diaspora.

Cornrows are worn by both sexes and are sometimes adorned with beads, shells or hair cuffs. Braiding cornrows takes up to five hours, depending on the quantity and width. Often favored for their easy maintenance, cornrows can be left in for weeks at a time if maintained through careful washing of the hair and natural oiling of the scalp. Braids are considered a protective styling on African kinky hair as they allow for easy and restorative growth; braids pulled too tightly or worn for longer periods and on different hair types can cause a type of hair loss known as traction alopecia.

== History ==
=== Africa ===
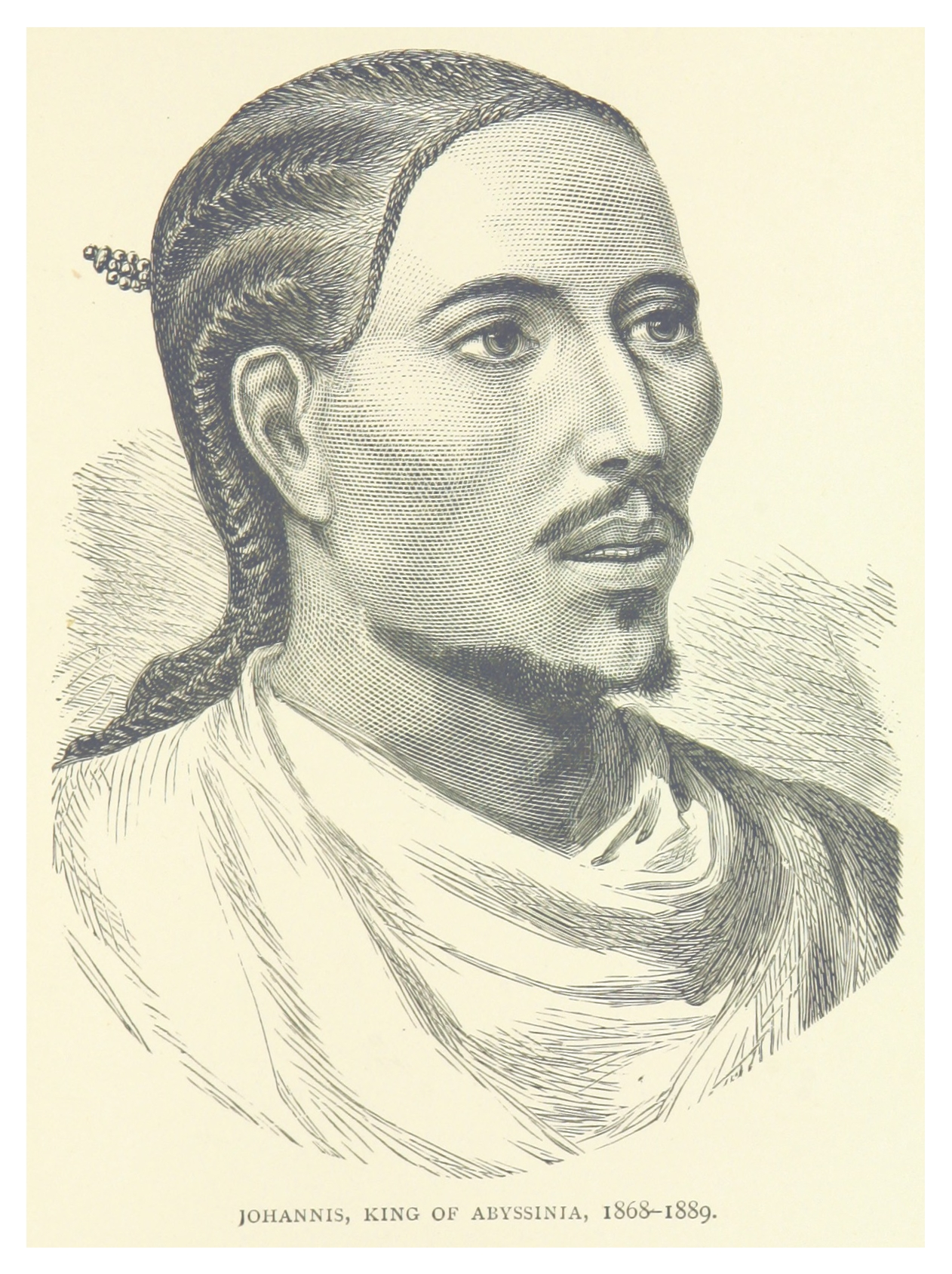
Portrait of Emperor Yohannes IV wearing traditional Ethiopian braids.

Cornrows originated in Africa, where they likely developed in response to the unique textures of African hair, and have held significance for different cultures throughout recorded history. Early depictions of women with what appear to be cornrows have been found in Stone Age paintings in the Tassili Plateau of the Sahara, and have been dated as far back as 3000 B.C. A similar style is also seen in depictions of the ancient Cushitic people of the Horn of Africa, who appear to be wearing this style of braids as far back as 2000 B.C. In Nubia, the remains of a young girl wearing cornrows has been dated to 550–750 A.D. Cornrows have also been documented in the ancient Nok civilization in Nigeria, in the Mende culture of Sierra Leone, and the Dan culture of the Côte d'Ivoire.

Women in West Africa have been attested wearing complex hairstyles of threaded or wrapped braids since at least the 18th century. These practices likely influenced the use of cornrows and headwraps (such as durags) among enslaved Africans taken to the Americas. In Ethiopia and Eritrea, there are many braided hairstyles which may include cornrows or "shuruba", such as Habesha or Albaso braids, and Tigray shuriba. Though such hairstyles have always been popular with women, Ethiopian men have also worn such hairstyles. In 19th century Ethiopia, male warriors and kings such as Tewodros II and Yohannes IV were depicted wearing braided hairstyles, including the shuruba.

Cornrow hairstyles in Africa also cover a wide social terrain: religion, kinship, status, age, racial diversity, and other attributes of identity can all be expressed in hairstyle. Just as important is the act of braiding, which passes on cultural values between generations, expresses bonds between friends, and establishes the role of professional practitioner. Braiding is traditionally a social ritual in many African cultures—as is hairstyling in general—and is often performed communally, as White and White explain:

In African cultures, the grooming and styling of hair have long been important social rituals. Elaborate hair designs, reflecting tribal affiliation, status, sex, age, occupation, and the like, were common, and the cutting, shaving, wrapping, and braiding of hair were centuries-old arts. In part, it was the texture of African hair that allowed these cultural practices to develop; as the historian John Thornton has observed, "the tightly spiraled hair of Africans makes it possible to design and shape it in many ways impossible for the straighter hair of Europeans."

=== Europe ===
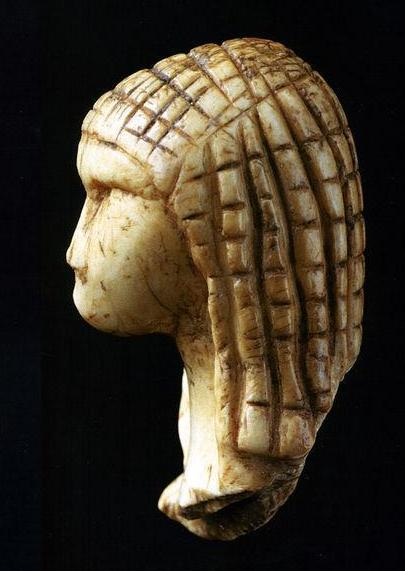
The Venus of Brassempouy is often thought to be wearing a wig or patterned hood, but not cornrows.

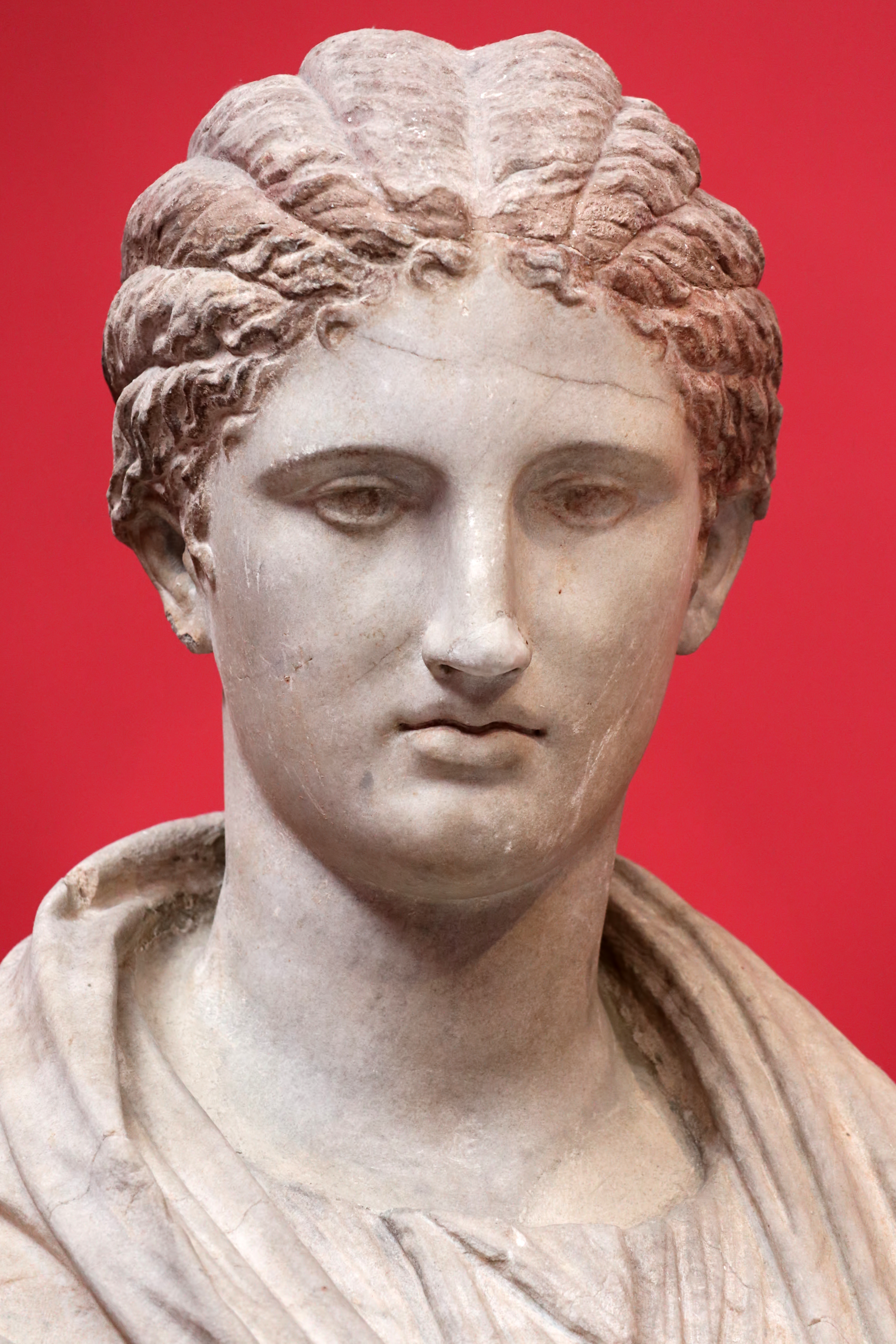
Small Herculaneum woman (c. 2nd century) with melon coiffure, which has been described as similar to modern cornrows

There have been a number of examples of European art and sculpture described as similar to modern cornrows, such as plaits, the melon coiffure and sini crenes.

The oldest of these depictions are the statues known as the Venus of Brassempouy and the Venus of Willendorf, which date between 23,000 and 29,000 years ago and were found in modern day France and Austria. Whether these statues feature cornrows, another type of braids, headdresses, or some other styling has been a matter of vigorous debate — most historians rule out cornrows, however. The Venus of Brassempouy is often said to wear a wig or a patterned hood, while the Venus of Willendorf is said to be wearing plaited hair or a fibrous cap.

Since the early 5th century B.C., Ancient Greek and Roman art shows men and women with a characteristic melon coiffure, especially in the "Oriental Aphrodite" tradition, which may be confused with cornrows. The traditional hairstyle of Roman Vestal Virgins, the sini crenes, also incorporates two braids that resemble cornrows.

=== Americas ===
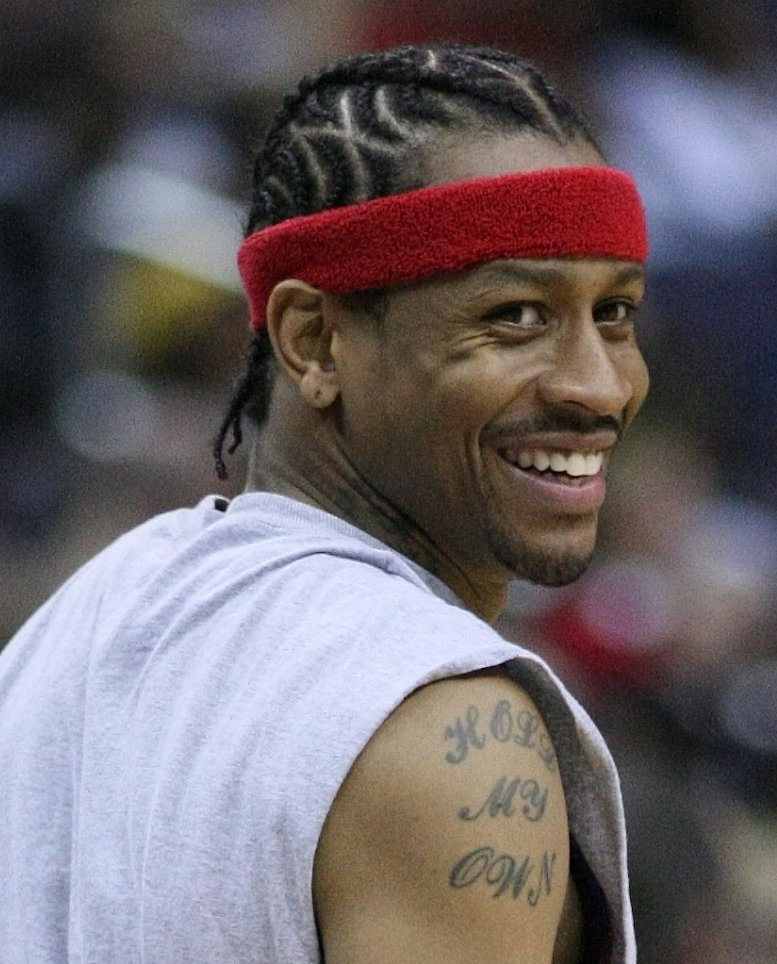
Philadelphia 76ers Hall of Famer Allen Iverson wearing his signature cornrows in 2008

The first recorded use of the word "cornrow" was in America in 1769, referring to the corn fields of the Americas. The earliest recorded use of the term "cornrows" to refer a hairstyle was in 1902. (Note: "Alice hunted up faithful old nurse Calline at once, sure of overflowing black motherly sympathy. She found her perched on the railing of the back gallery, combing her hair in long 'corn-rows'." Century Magazine, October 1902, 966/1.) The name "canerows" may be more common in parts of the Caribbean due to the historic role of sugar plantations in the region.

As in Africa, grooming was a social activity for Black people on the American plantations; the enslaved Africans were reported helping each other style their hair into a wide variety of appearances. On his visit to a plantation in Natchez, Mississippi, New Englander Joseph lngraham wrote, "No scene can be livelier or more interesting to a Northerner, than that which the negro quarters of a well regulated plantation present, on a Sabbath morning, just before church hour." Hairstyles were so characteristic of a person, even when their appearance and behaviour was otherwise heavily regulated, that they were often used to identify runaways, and enslaved Africans sometimes had their hair shaved as a form of punishment. Generally, however, slaveholders in the British colonies gave their Black slaves a degree of latitude in how they wore their hair. Thus, wearing traditional hairstyles offered a way to assert their bodily autonomy when they otherwise had none.

Enslaved Black people may have chosen to wear cornrows to keep their hair neat and flat to their scalp while working; the other styles they developed alongside cornrows blended African, European and Native American trends and traditions. African-American, Afro-Latino and Caribbean folklore also relates multiple stories of cornrows being used to communicate or provide maps for slaves across the "New World". Today, such styles retain their link with Black self-expression and creativity, and may also serve as a form of political expression.

Cornrows gained in popularity in the United States in the 1960s and 1970s, and again during the 1990s and 2000s. In the 2000s, some athletes wore cornrows, including NBA basketball players Allen Iverson, Rasheed Wallace, and Latrell Sprewell. Some female mixed martial artists have chosen to wear cornrows for their fights as it prevents their hair from obscuring their vision as they move.

== Attitudes to cornrows ==
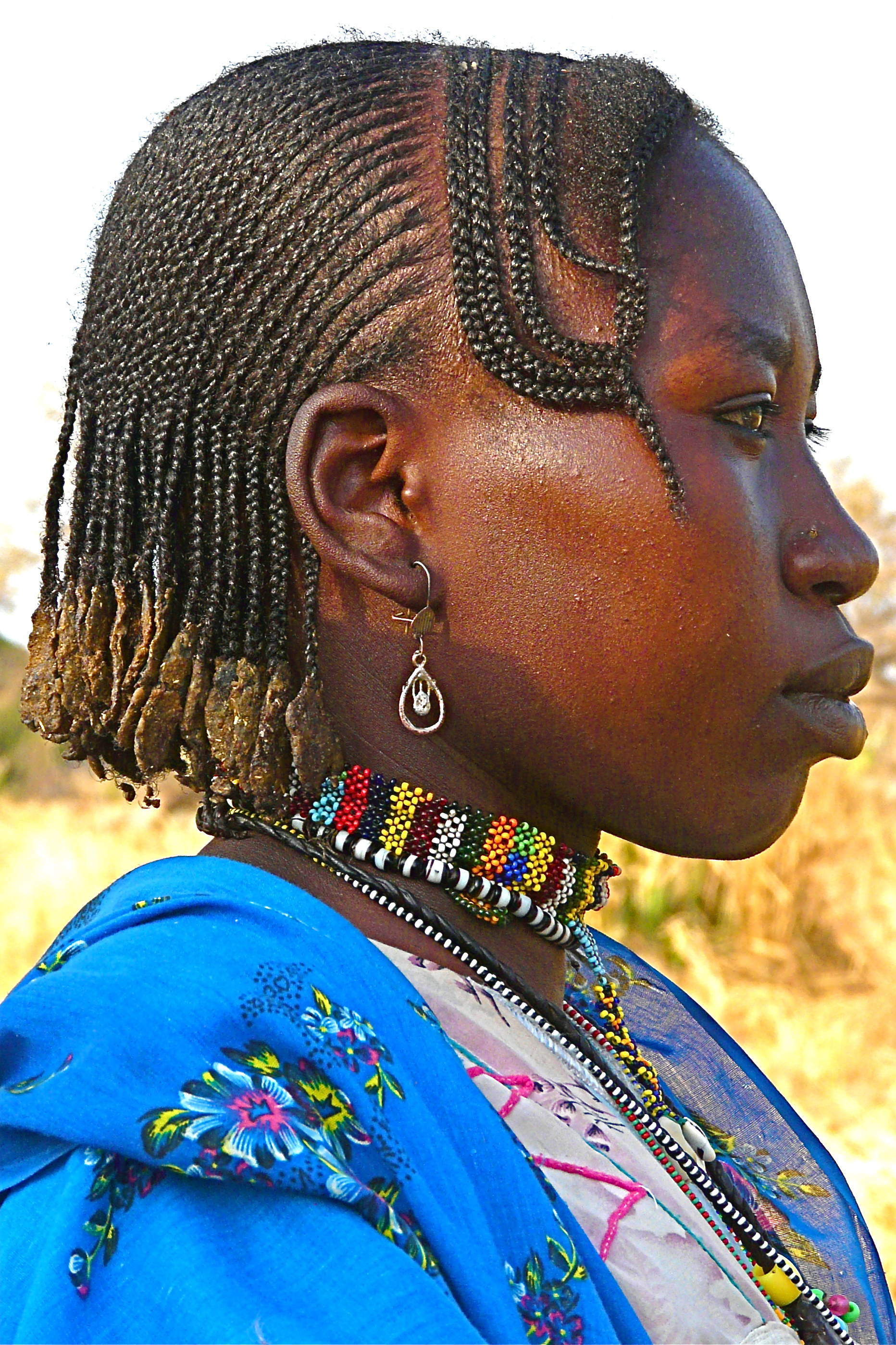
A Nuba woman wearing cornrows in a traditional styling

Colonial attitudes and practices towards Black hairstyles reinforced racism, exclusion and inequality. For example, during the 18th century, slaves would sometimes have their hair shaved as a lesser form of punishment. Eurocentric beauty standards, which often denigrate Black hairstyles, can lead to internalized racism, colorism, and marginalization, which negatively affect Black people—and Black women in particular. Related valuations of hair texture—which portray straighter hair as "good hair" and curlier hair as "bad hair"—are emphasized through the media, advertising, and popular culture. These attitudes to hair can devalue African heritage and lead to discrimination. The unique type of discrimination that arises from prejudice towards Black women's hair is called natural hair discrimination. Despite these challenges, cornrows have gained popularity among Black people as a way to express their Blackness, creativity and individuality.

Cornrows, alongside dreadlocks, have been the subject of several disputes in U.S. workplaces, as well as universities and schools. Some employers and educational institutions have considered cornrows unsuitable or "unprofessional", and have banned them. Employees and civil rights groups have countered that such attitudes evidence cultural bias or racism, and some disputes have resulted in litigation. In 1981, Renee Rogers sued American Airlines for their policy which banned cornrows and other braided hairstyles. Other cases, such as Mitchell vs Marriott Hotel and Pitts vs. Wild Adventures, soon followed. Since other traditional Black hairstyles are also often banned, Black women may be forced to straighten their hair or emulate European hairstyles at significant additional cost. The intersection of racialized and gendered discrimination against Black women is often called misogynoir. In California, the CROWN Act was passed in 2019 to prohibit discrimination based on hair style and hair texture.

In 2011, the High Court of the United Kingdom, in a decision reported as a test case, ruled against a school's decision to refuse entry to a student with cornrows. The school claimed this was part of its policy mandating "short back and sides" haircuts, and banning styles that might be worn as indicators of gang membership. However, the court ruled that the student was expressing a tradition and that such policies, while possibly justifiable in certain cases (e.g. skinhead gangs), had to accommodate reasonable racial diversities and cultural practices.

In some African nations, regularly changing hairstyles can be seen as a sign of social status for a woman, while advertising continues to promote straighter hairstyles as fashionable. Braids provide a way for women to maintain their hair, and are sometimes used with Chinese or Indian wigs to rotate hairstyles.

== Gallery ==
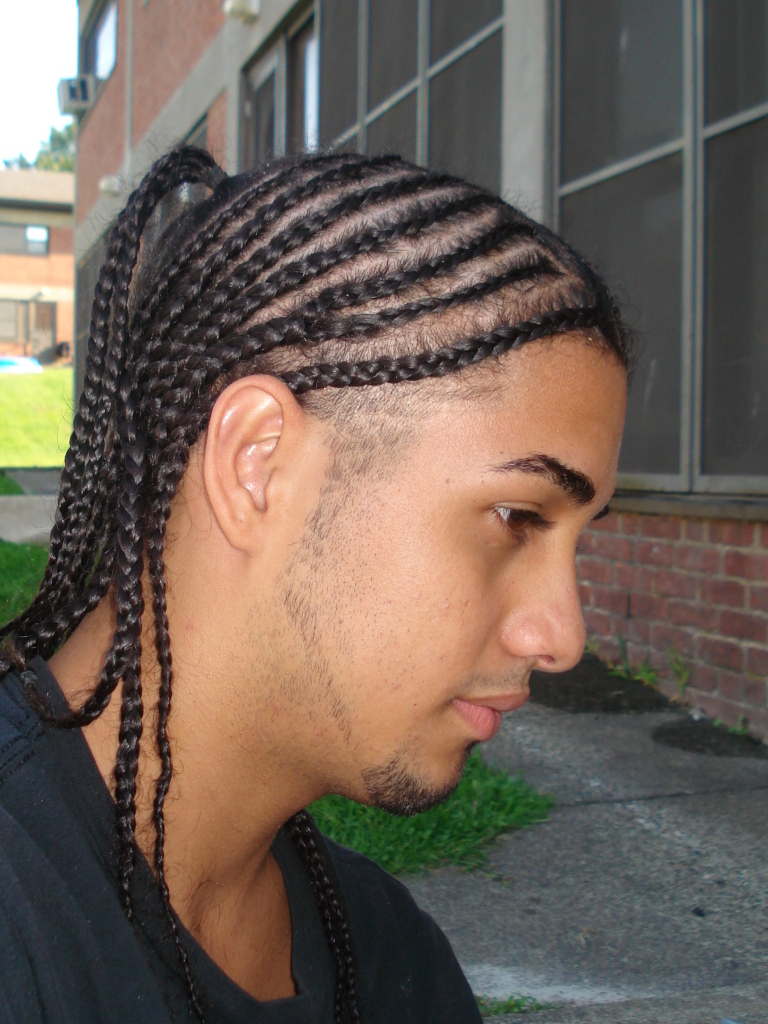
Styled cornrows

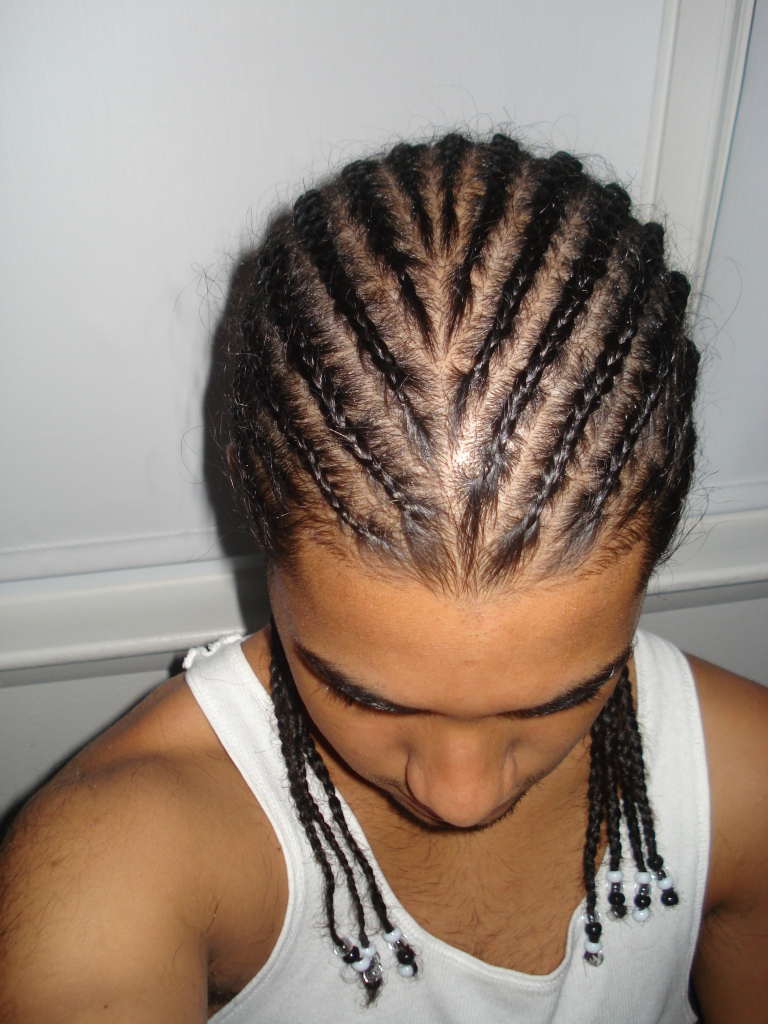
Cornrows

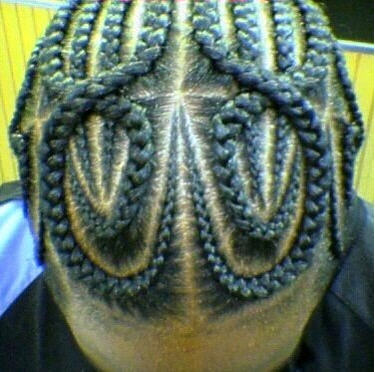
Artistic braiding

== See also ==
- List of hairstyles
- Shuku
- Koroba
- Crochet braids
- Waves (hairstyle)
