= Pigtail =

Hairstyle gathering hair at the sides of the head

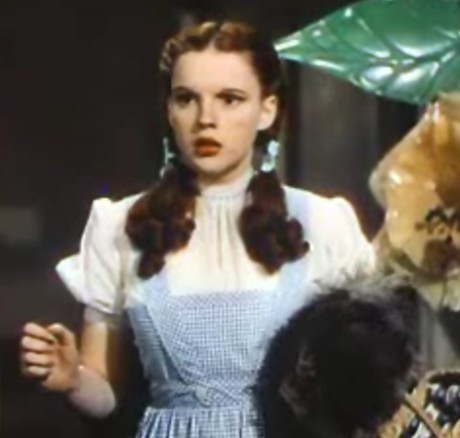
Judy Garland appears in The Wizard of Oz trailer with pigtails, 1939

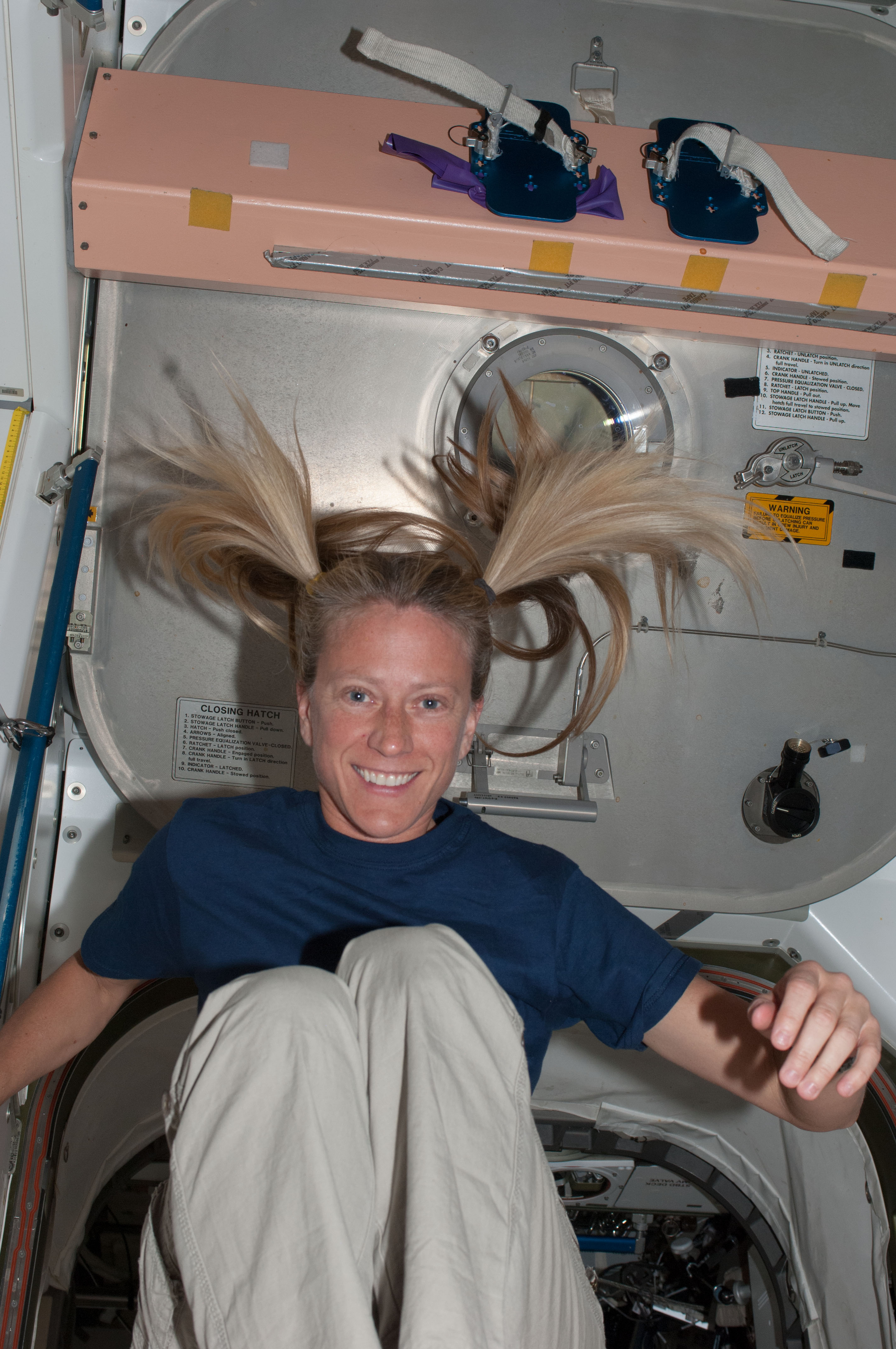
Karen Nyberg appears with her hair in pigtails in the Unity node aboard the International Space Station, 2013

Pigtails (or twin tail or twintail) are a hairstyle of twin ponytails or braids on opposite sides of the head. Sometimes unbraided pigtails are called doggie ears or bunches, and usage of the term "pigtails" varies.

== Word origin and usage ==
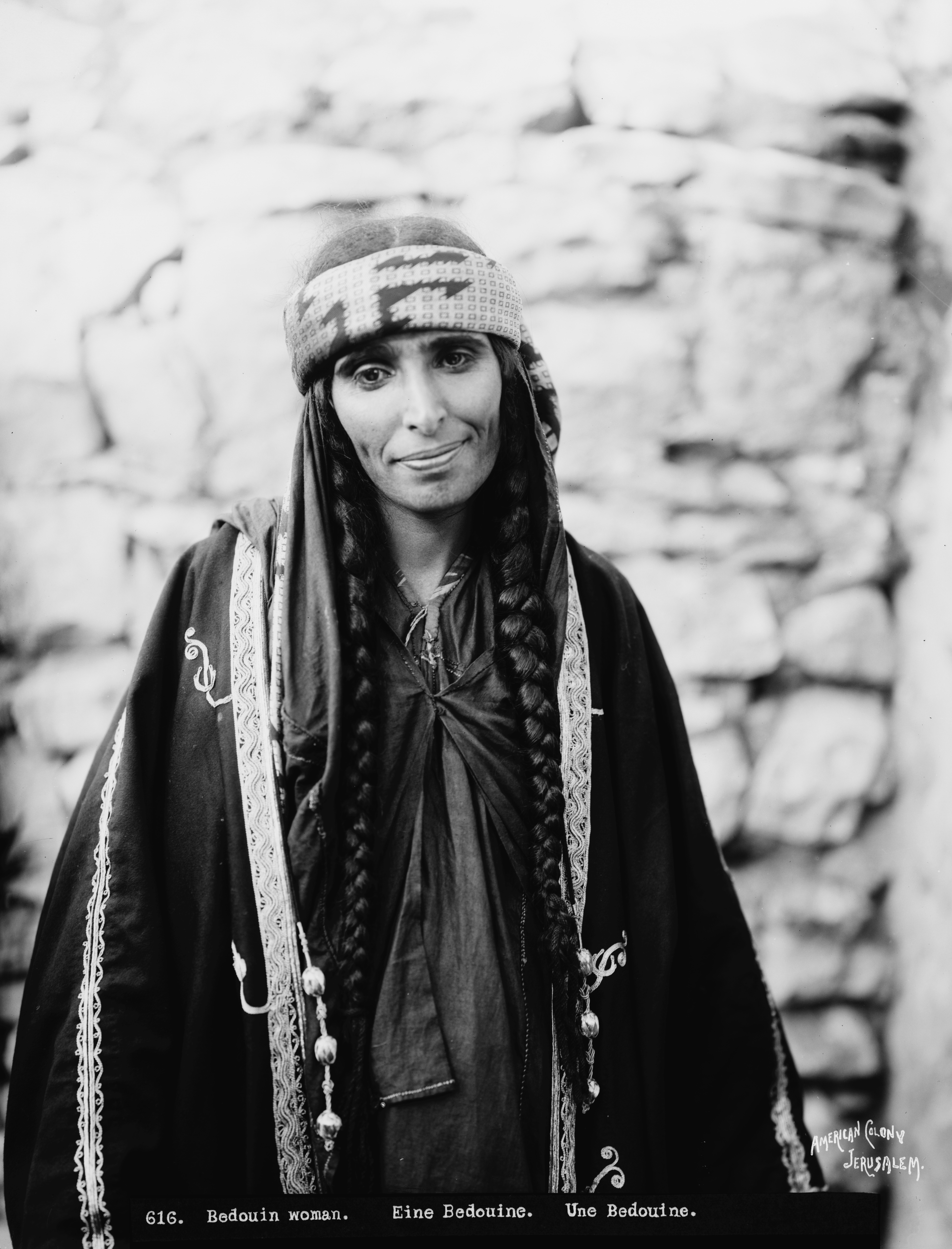
Bedouin woman with braided pigtails, between 1898 and 1914.

The term pigtail appears in English in the American colonies in the 17th century to describe a twist of chewing tobacco. One of the steps in processing the tobacco was to twist a handful of leaves together to form a compact bunch that would then be cured (dried, either with or without smoking). The term "pigtail" was applied to the bunch based on its resemblance to a twisted pig's tail.

From the later 17th century through the 19th century, the term came to be applied to any braided ("plaited", in British parlance) hairstyle. The British army also adopted a single pigtail or "queue" as its standard dress for long hair. British barristers continue to wear a wig with pigtails as a way to hide the hairline in an attempt to provide basic anonymity.

Robert Louis Stevenson mentions "pigtail" referring to hair and then to "pigtail tobacco" in the first and fourth chapters of Treasure Island, respectively.

Most modern dictionaries still define "pigtail" as a single tight braid. However, many speakers use the term to describe two symmetrical bunches of hair on either side of the head, braided or not.

== Styles ==
There are numerous styles of pigtails in which a person may wear their hair. They may be braided, straightened, beaded, ribboned, in buns, fishtailed, and even French braided. Pigtails can be placed on different parts of a person's head: high, low, or to the side.

In some regions of China, traditional culture related the wearing of pigtails to a girl's marital status. A young, unmarried, Chinese girl would often wear two buns, or bundles of hair on either side of the head to display her availability to prospective husbands. This style of pigtails is sometimes referred to as "ox horns." However, when this girl would marry, the two pigtails, or buns, would be replaced with just one, thus indicating her marriage.

The Manchu and later Qing dynasty men's coiffe called the "queue" is sometimes described incorrectly as a pigtail.

Notable pigtails in pop culture include Baby Spice of the Spice Girls and Britney Spears in the ... Baby One More Time music video. Fictional characters known for pigtails include Harley Quinn, Angelica Pickles in Rugrats, Sailor Moon, Louise Lasser as Mary Hartman in Mary Hartman, Mary Hartman, and Boo from Monsters Inc..

=== Bunches ===
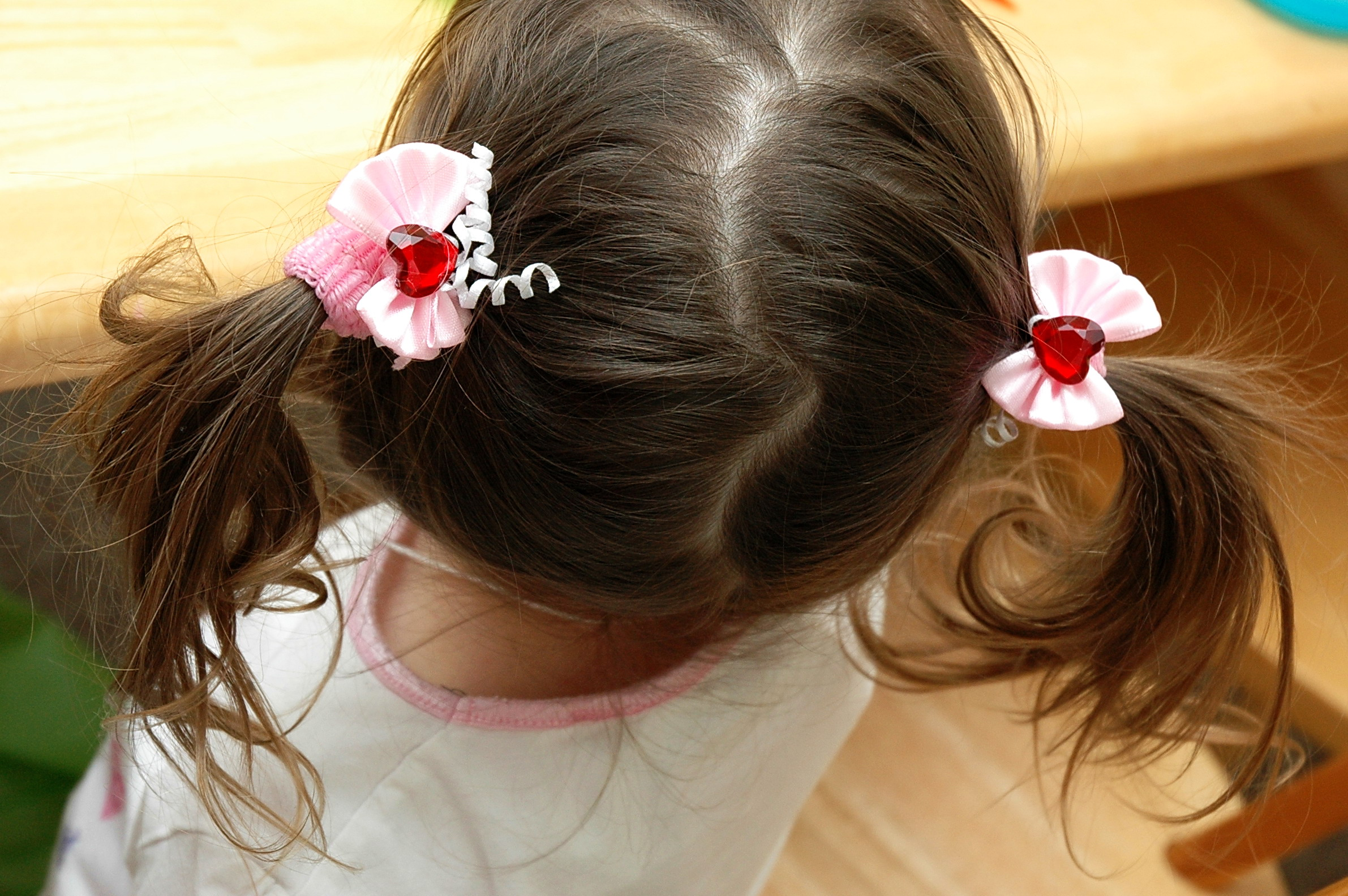
Sometimes the portrayed hairstyle is referred to as "pigtails" in general, while "bunches" is more specific as they are unplaited.

Bunches (also called pigtails, bunchies, twintails or angel wings) are a hairstyle in which the hair is parted down the middle and gathered into two symmetrical bundles, like ponytails, secured near the scalp. Sometimes this hairstyle is referred to as "pigtails", but in other cases the term "pigtails" applies only if the hair is braided.

=== In Japan ===
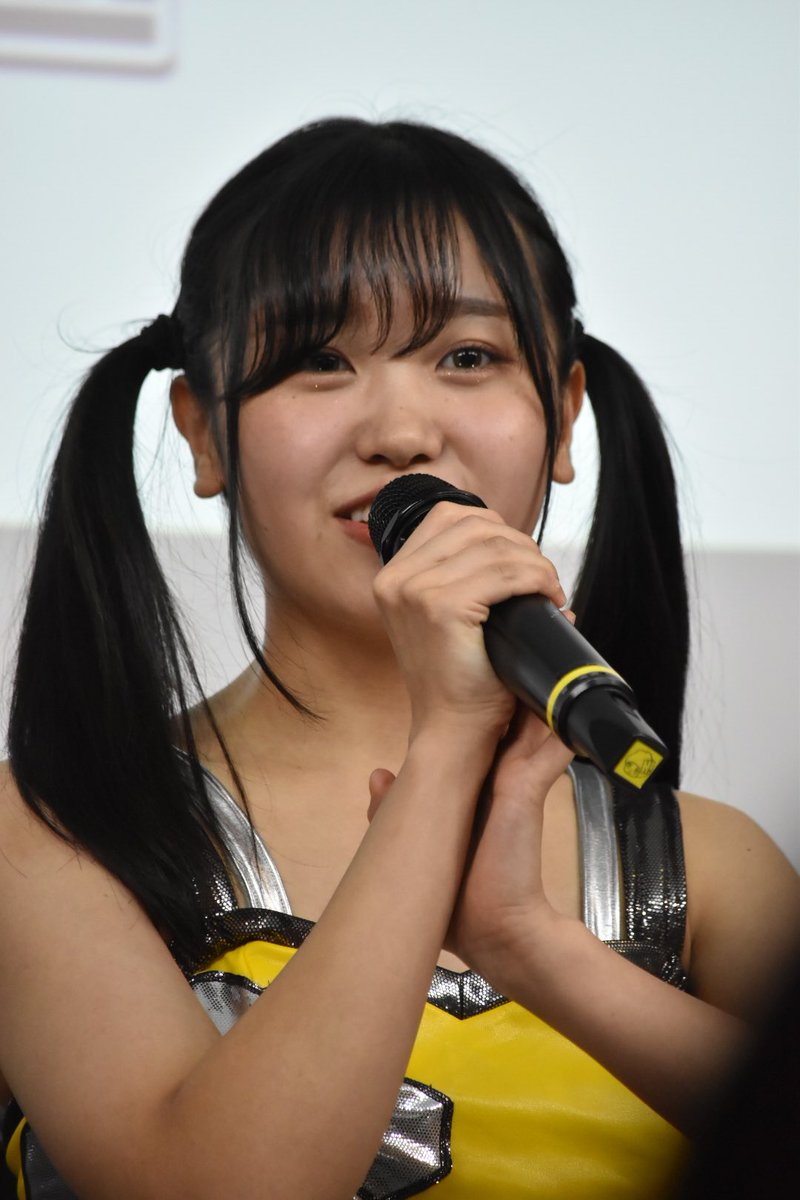
Suzume

Unbraided pigtails are extremely popular in Japan, especially in anime and manga fandom and Japanese otaku culture. Traditionally a hairstyle worn by young girls, it has come to represent innocence, and is also known as the "twintail" or futatsu-yui (二つ結い). Anime and manga characters sporting twintails have been prevalent since the 1960s, and the hairstyle has since entered mainstream culture, in part due to Vocaloid Hatsune Miku embracing the look. This includes the creation of a "Japan Twintail Association" to promote and celebrate the hairstyle, as well as running photo spreads of models sporting the dual tails. "Twin Tail Day" is officially recognized by the Japan Anniversary Association and falls on February 2, when women post images of themselves with the hairstyle onto Twitter.

- In Japan, hair bunches are called 'twin tails' (ツインテール, tsuin teeru). A popular variation is the odango hairstyle, in which each ponytail is partially coiled around its base to form a small bun from which the remaining length hangs free.

== See also ==
- Pigtail Ordinance
- French braid
- List of hairstyles
