= Heinrich Pommerencke =

German artist

Heinrich Pommerencke (1821–1873) was a successful portrait painter of Mecklenburg-Schwerin.

== Life ==
Pommerencke was born on 21 June 1821 in Plate near Schwerin and brought up in poverty. He pursued his studies in art in Berlin from 1848 to 1851. After returning to Schwerin, he returned to Berlin to further studies under Carl Joseph Begas with a scholarship from Frederick Francis II, Grand Duke of Mecklenburg-Schwerin. He also went to Paris between 1851 and 1854 in the studio of the historian Ary Scheffer. He painted the portrait of Helena, Duchess of Orleans, by which he gained the protection of the reigning royal family. After a trip to Rome, he returned to Schwerin in 1854, where he painted many pictures for the Grand Duke. His portraits were also popular with the bourgeoisie of North Germany. He died on 21 February 1873 in Schwerin.

The Staatliches Museum Schwerin has 28 paintings from Pommerencke, 25 of which are portraits; More are at Kulturhistorisches Museum in Rostock (Museum of Cultural History).

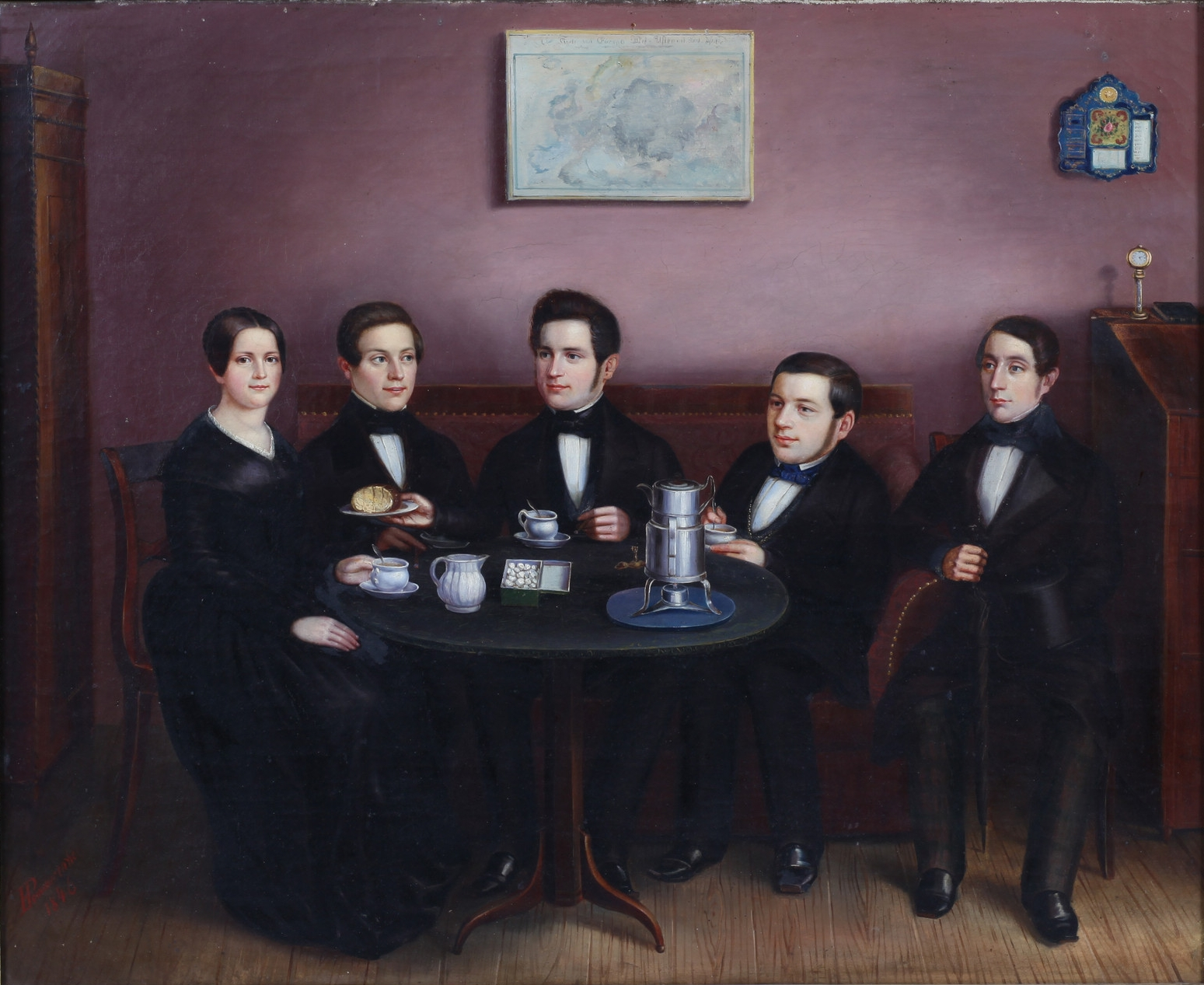
Die Teegesellschaft — the tea party, 1846
