= Crochet braids =

Synthetic hair extensions

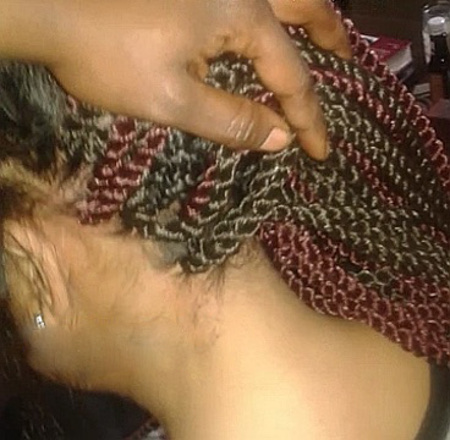
Crochet twists

Crochet braids, also known as latch hook braids, are techniques for braiding hair that involve crocheting synthetic hair extensions to a person's natural hair with a latch hook or crochet hook. While crochet braids are a hybrid of traditional braids, they're considered to be more similar to weaves. This method is associated with African hair styles. Known as a protective style, the technique can assist with hair growth if cared for properly. Crochet braids can be worn straight, curly, twisted, or braided.

== Description ==
=== Installation ===
The natural hair can be twisted or braided, but is most commonly styled into cornrows before affixing the synthetic hair. Using a latch hook or crochet hook, the synthetic hair (in the form of loose bulk or braiding hair) is then attached. Parts of the hair extensions are grabbed by the hook and pulled through the underside of each cornrow, working from the front of the hair to the back at a 90 degree angle. This process can take up to 4-6 hours. Popular methods include traditional, individuals, and invisible knot method.

=== Maintenance ===
Moisturizing hair and scalp with oils or leave-in-conditioner is a matter of preference. A light oil spray, such as Argan Oil, works well with crochet braids, since it is light and deep moisturizing. However, over-moisturization can lead to product build up. The protective style is typically preserved during sleep by covering with a satin bonnet or scarf.

=== Removal ===
To remove, pull loop over pre-braided or twisted synthetic hair end reversing installation. Take down may require scissors for loose or wavy crochet hair. Cutting as close to knots as possible.

Post removal treatment such as deep conditioning, helps prevent hair breakage by restoring moisture.

== See also ==
- List of hairstyles
