= Koroba (hairstyle) =

African hairstyle

Koroba is a type of Yoruba braid hairstyle. Koroba means basket in the Yoruba language. The name comes from the shape and design of the hairstyle. It is shaped like a basket upside down. The braids come from the middle of the head, downwards and spread to other parts of the head. It is a rounded circular hairstyle that comes straight or curled at the ends. Koroba is one of the indigenous Yoruba braids and represents one of the many traditional African braids.
