= Braid =

Structure of strands of flexible material

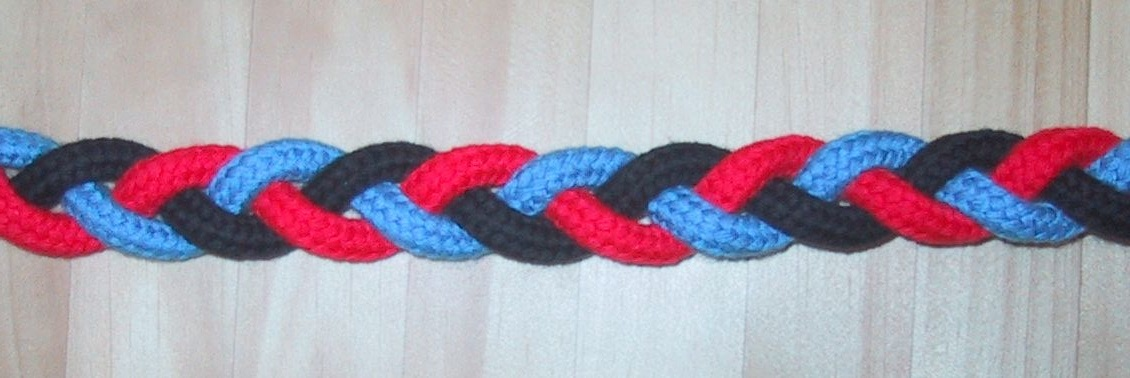
A braid

A braid (also referred to as a plait; /plæt/) is a complex structure or pattern formed by interlacing three or more strands of flexible material such as textile yarns, wire, or hair. The simplest and most common version is a flat, solid, three-stranded structure. More complex patterns can be constructed from an arbitrary number of strands to create a wider range of structures (such as a fishtail braid, a five-stranded braid, rope braid, a French braid and a waterfall braid). The structure is usually long and narrow with each component strand functionally equivalent in zigzagging forward through the overlapping mass of the others. It can be compared with the process of weaving, which usually involves two separate perpendicular groups of strands (warp and weft).

Historically, the materials used have depended on the French plants and animals available in the local area. During the Industrial Revolution, mechanized braiding equipment was invented to increase production. The braiding technique was used to make ropes with both natural and synthetic fibers as well as coaxial cables for radios using copper wire. In more recent times it has been used to create a covering for fuel pipes in jet aircraft and ships (first using glass fibre, then stainless steel and Kevlar). Hoses for domestic plumbing are often covered with stainless steel braid.

== Hair braiding ==
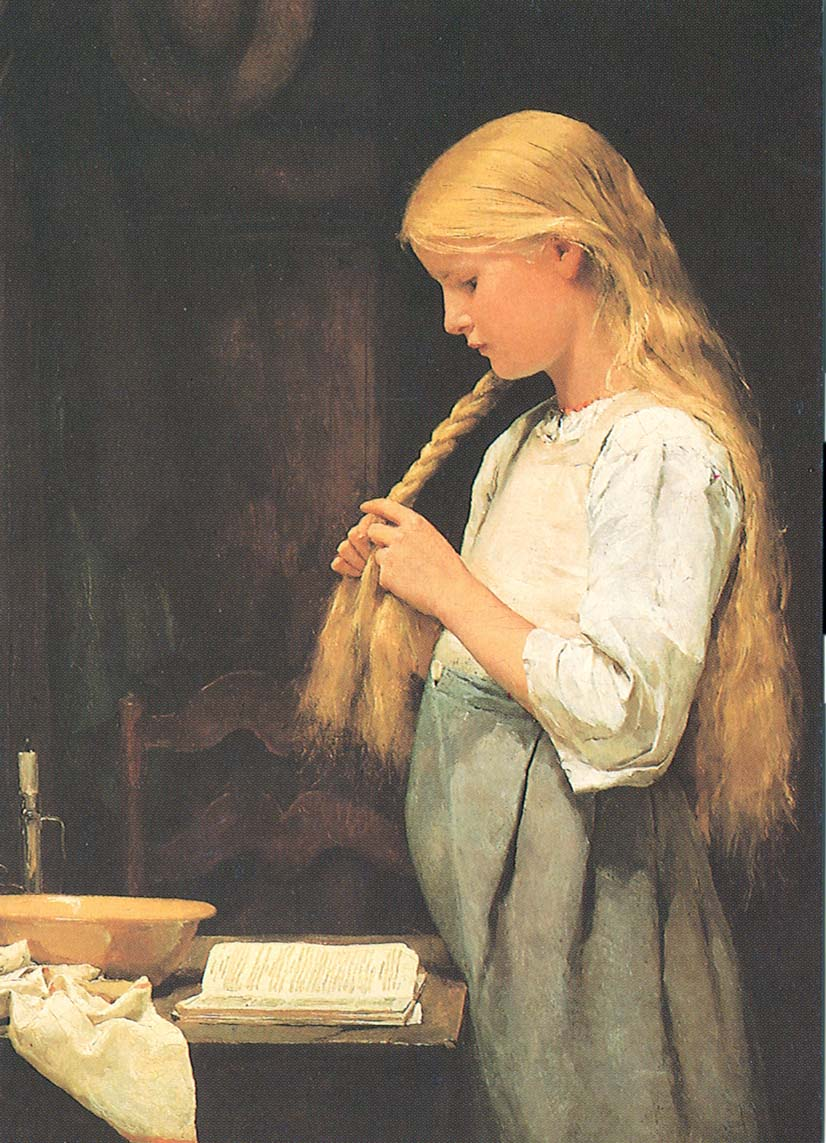
Mädchen, die Haare flechtend (1887), by Albert Anker.

The oldest known reproduction of hair braiding may go back about 30,000 years: the Venus of Willendorf, a female figurine estimated to have been made between about 28,000 and 25,000 BC in modern-day Austria. The Venus of Brassempouy from the southwest of France is estimated to be about 25,000 years old and shows a braided hairstyle.

In Africa, the earliest evidence of braided hair dates back to 3500 BCE, particularly among the Himba people of Namibia. This ancient practice, which is over 5,000 years old, held deep cultural, social, and religious significance, representing a person's tribe, age, marital status, and wealth. Like how different versions of Cinderella are traceable to nearly every culture, braids, too, are polygenetic. One early example of hair braiding takes place in 1279-1213 BCE as recorded in the story of Isis: "when some of the queen's maidens came to the well, she greeted them kindly and began to braid their hair."

During the Bronze Age and Iron Age, many peoples in the Near East, Asia Minor, Caucasus, East Mediterranean and North Africa are depicted in art with braided or plaited hair and beards. Similarly, the practice is recorded in Europe, Africa, India, China, Japan, Australasia and Central Asia.

Braiding is traditionally a social art. Because of the time it takes to braid hair, people have often taken time to socialize while braiding and having their hair braided. It begins with the elders making simple knots and braids for younger children. Older children watch and learn from them, start practicing on younger children, and eventually learn the traditional designs. This carries on a tradition of bonding between elders and the new generation.

== Industrial history and use ==
Early braids had many uses, such as costume decoration, animal regalia (like camel girths), sword decoration, bowls and hats (from palm leaves), locks (such as those made in Japan to secure precious tea supplies through the use of elaborate knots), and weapons (e.g. slings).

Materials that are used in braids can vary depending on local materials. For instance, South Americans used the very fine fibers from the wool of alpaca and llama, while North American people made use of bison fibers. Throughout the world, vegetable fibers such as grass, nettle, and hemp have been used to create braids. In China, Korea, and Japan silk still remains the main material used. In the Americas, the braiding of leather is also common. Plaiting with kangaroo leather has been a widely practiced tradition in rural Australia since pioneering times. It is used in the production of fine leather belts, hatbands, bridles, dog leads, bullwhips, stockwhips, etc. Other leathers are used for the plaiting of heavier products suitable for everyday use.

For nomadic peoples, braiding was a practical means of producing useful and decorative textiles. In other areas, such as the Pacific islands (where leaves and grasses are braided), and for many hill tribes, braids are made using minimal equipment. It was only when braiding became a popular occupation in the home or school, as it is in China and Japan, and when the Industrial Revolution came about, that specific tools were developed to increase production and make it easier to produce more complicated patterns of braids.

Braids are also very good for making rope and decorative objects. Complex braids have been used to create hanging fibre artworks.

Gold braids and silver braids are components or trims of many kinds of formal dress, including military uniform (in epaulettes, aiguillettes, on headgear).

=== Ropes and cables ===
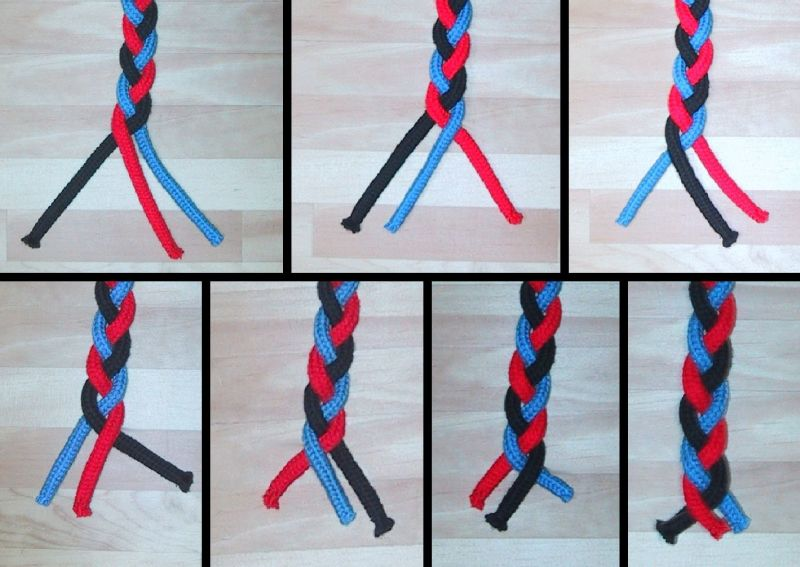
A step-by-step creation of a basic braid using three strings

Braiding creates a composite rope that is thicker than the non-interlaced strands of yarns. Braided ropes are preferred by arborists, rock climbers, and in sport sailing because they do not twist under load, as does an ordinary twisted-strand rope. These ropes consist of one or more concentric tubular braided jackets surrounding either several small twisted fibre cords, or a single untwisted yarn of straight fibres, and are known as Kernmantle ropes.

In electrical and electronic cables, braid is a tubular sheath made of braided strands of metal placed around a central cable for shielding against electromagnetic interference. The braid is grounded while the central conductor(s) carries the signal. The braid may be used in addition to a foil jacket to increase shielding and durability. Litz wire uses braids of thin insulated wires to carry high frequency signals with much lower losses from skin effect or to minimise proximity effect in transformers. Flat braids made of many copper wires can also be used for flexible electrical connections between large components. The numerous smaller wires comprising the braid are much more resistant to breaking under repeated motion and vibration than is a cable of larger wires.

Similar braiding is used on pressurized hoses, such as in plumbing and hydraulic brake systems in automobiles. Braiding is also used for fibres for composite reinforcements.

A property of the basic braid is that removing one strand unlinks the other two, as they are not twisted around each other. Mathematically, a braid with that property is called a Brunnian braid.

== Food ==
Onion and garlic stalks are often braided for storage after they are partially dried.

Challah is a braided type of bread in Jewish cuisine.

== Metaphors ==
Braids are often used figuratively to represent interweaving or combination, such as in, "He braided many different ideas into a new whole."

In some river and stream systems, small streams join and redivide in many places. Such stream systems are said to be braided. These are often found in alluvial fans at the outlet of canyons. This is a result of heavy sediment deposition at high flows followed by re-erosion at low flows.

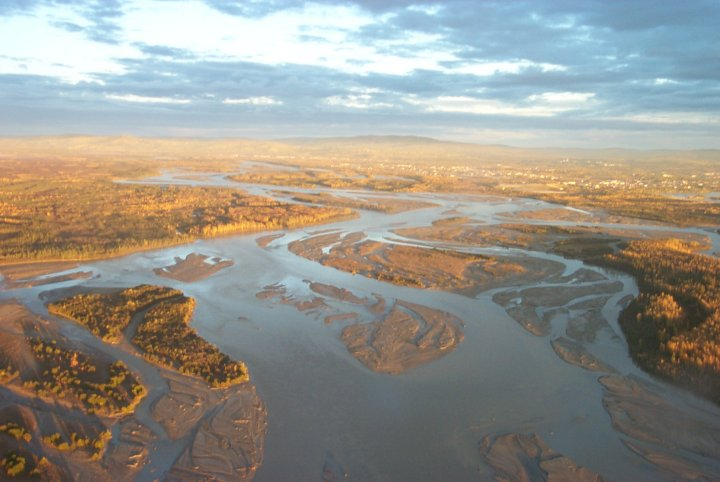
The braided streams of the Tanana River

== Gallery ==
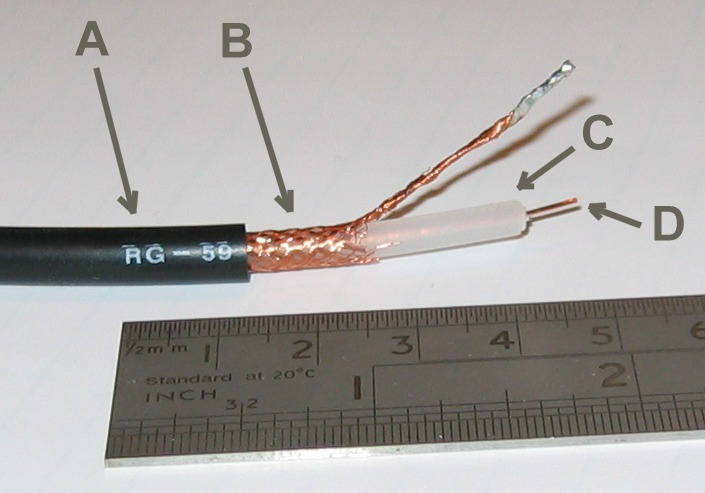
A coaxial cable with braided copper wire EMI shielding (B)

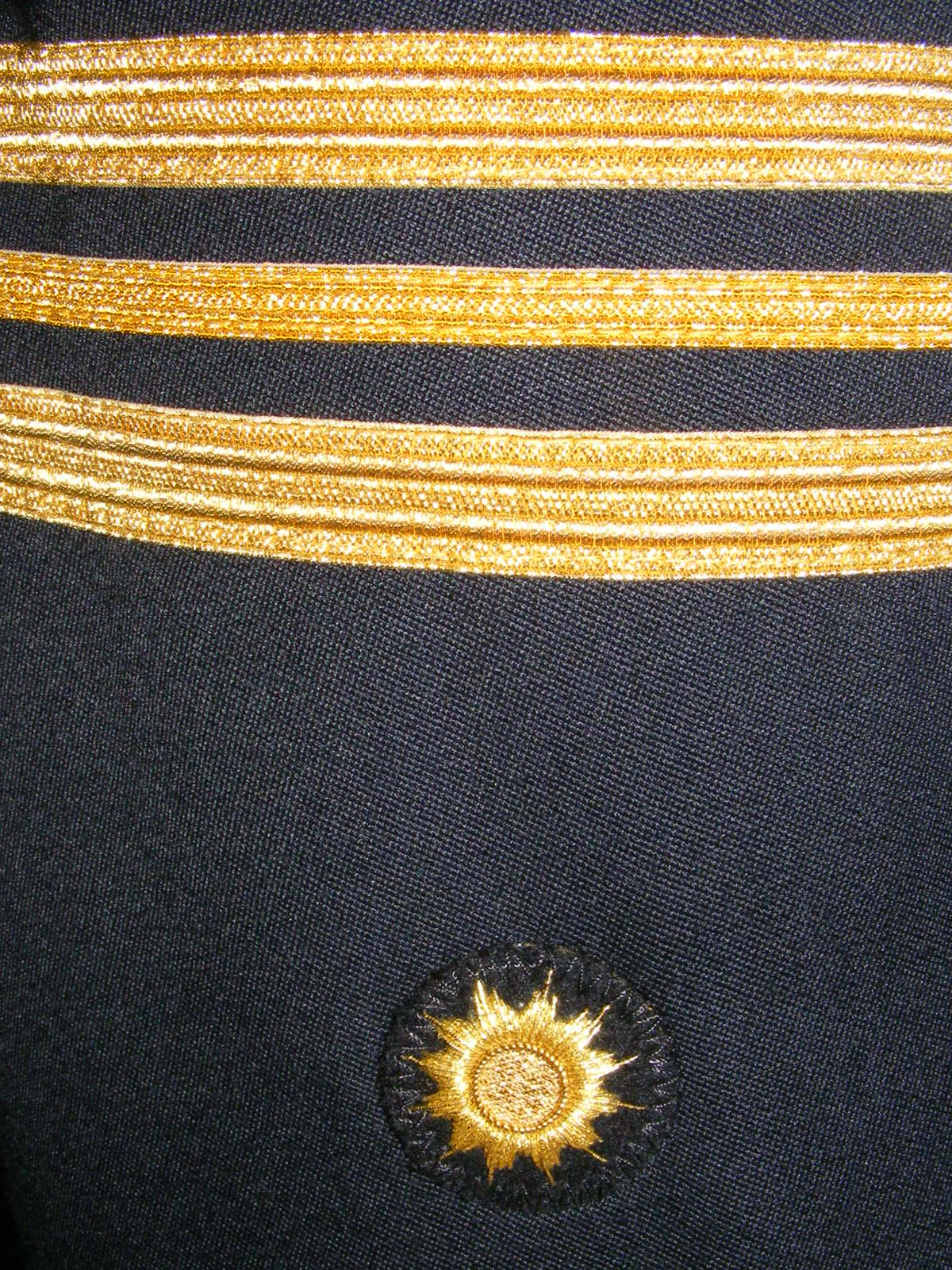
A gold braid on a police uniform

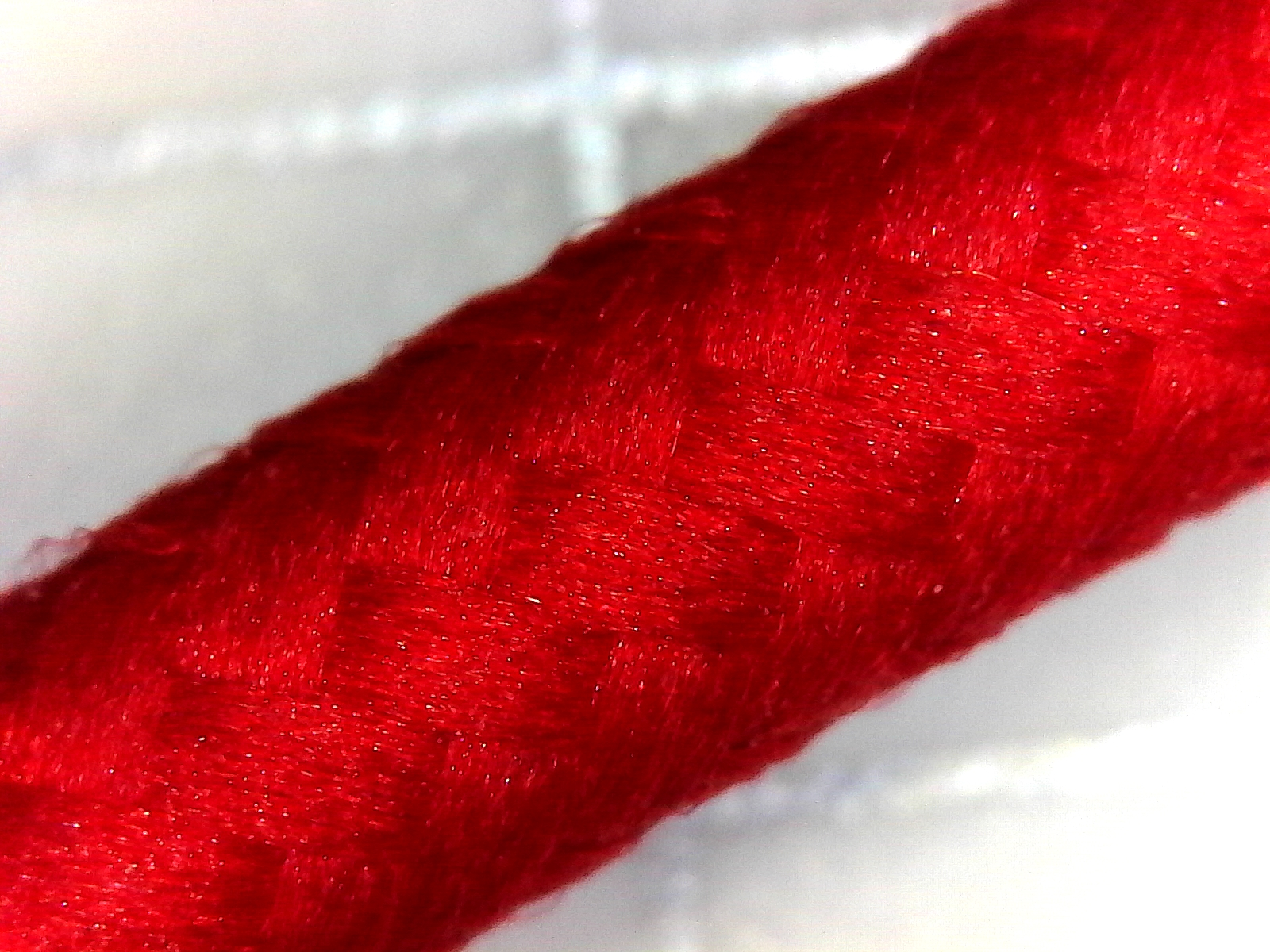
A close up of a red braided USB cable.

== See also ==
- African hair threading
- Braiding machines
- Braid theory
- Ceinture fléchée
- Kumihimo, Japanese braid
- List of hairstyles
- Lucet
- Ply-split braiding
- Sennit
