= Shuku =

Shuku (also spelled Suku and Sùkú) is a type of Yoruba braided hairstyle. It is a series of braids taken to the top of the head and mounted upwards to form a hump on top of the head. Shuku is primarily worn by women. Shuku can also be merged with other braiding styles.

Shuku is popular among all age groups from school girls to older women. Like other traditional Yoruba hairstyles and braids, it is used in traditional ceremonies and settings, as well as dances and events to showcase culture.
