= African hair threading =

Hairstyle created by tying threads around hair

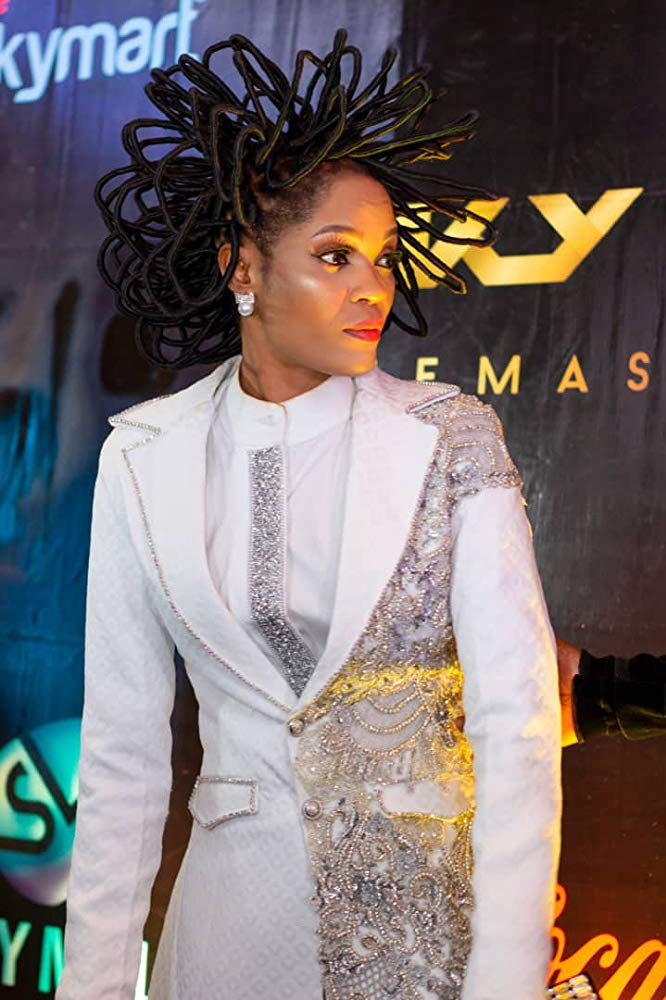
Chika Lann in threaded hairstyle

African hair threading (also known as hair threading/ threading) is a traditional hairstyling technique unique to sub-Saharan African culture. This practice involves intricately wrapping or braiding the natural hair with threads, often made of wool, cotton, or Nylon, to create elaborate patterns.

== Etymology and names ==
African hair threading has multiple names across Africa in the West African country of Nigeria for example different ethnic groups know African hair threading by their native names. The native name in the Igbo language is isi òwu or òwu isī. In Yoruba language, it is known as Irun Kiko. In Ghana in the Ga language it is known as Akweley Waabii, in East Africa it is known as Nywele in the Swahili language.

== Origins ==
Hair threading is a prevalent traditional hairstyle within many sub-Saharan African societies, particularly prevalent in the cultures of Western and Central Africa. The practice of African hair threading traces its origins back centuries as early as the 15th century.

== Process ==
The process begins by sectioning the hair, then wrapping each section with threads and tightly securing the hair in place. This technique serves as a protective style, safeguarding hair from breakage.

== Variations and styles ==
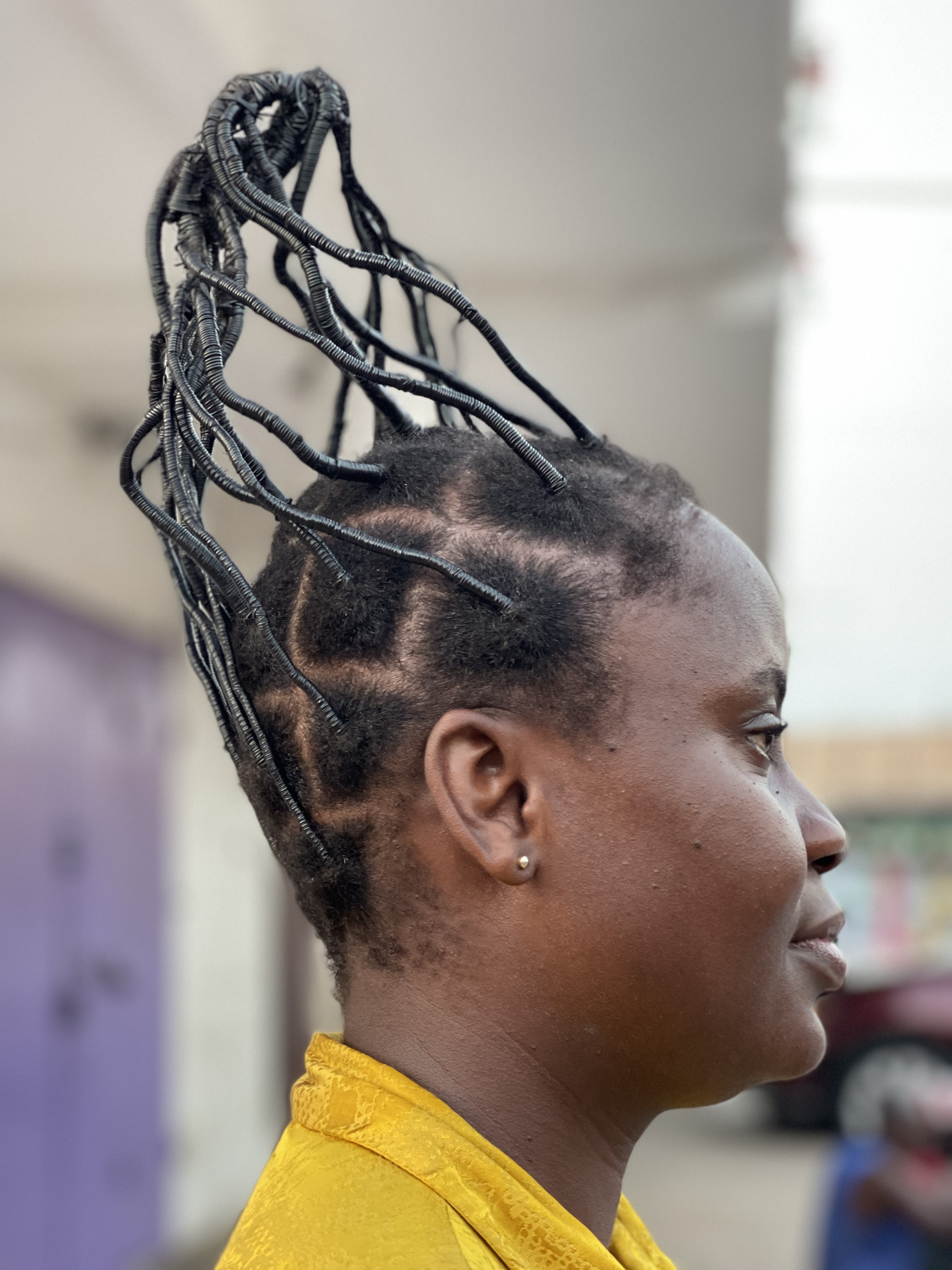
A Ghanaian woman in an african hair threading hairstyle known as 'Adonko Hair Style' or 'Watchman's Wife.'

There are many variations and styles in African hair threading, depending on the types and patterns as well as the shape, size, and direction of the sections of hair.

Some of the common styles include the corkscrew, this style involves wrapping the thread around the hair in a spiral motion, creating long, springy sections that resemble corkscrews. other styles include Flat twists Different colors of threads can be used in creating contrast or to highlight patterns in hair threading.

== See also ==
- List of hairstyles
- Crochet braids
- Waves (hairstyle)
- Box braids
