= French braid =

Type of braid

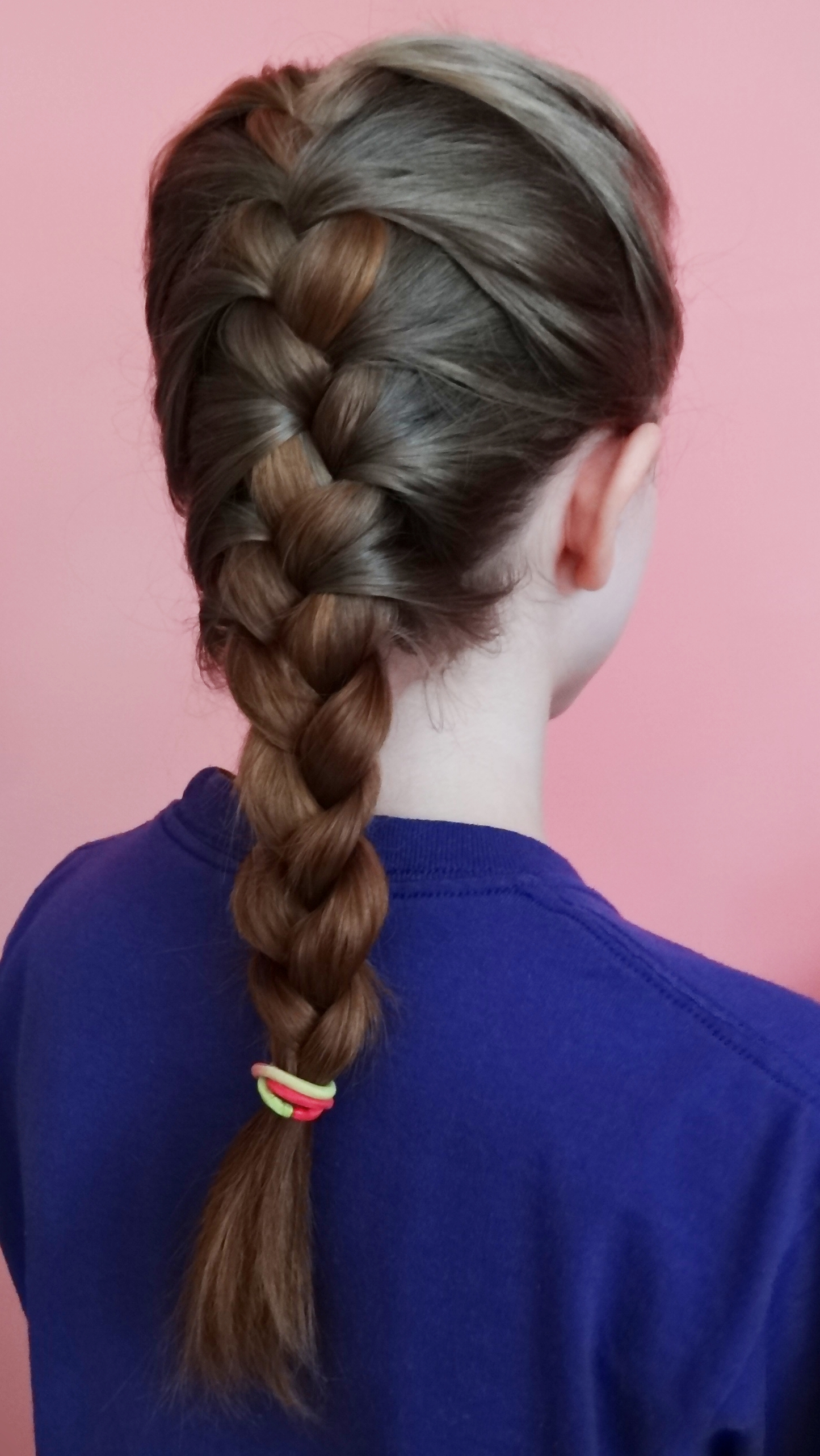

A French braid, also called a French plait, is a type of braided hairstyle. The three-strand gathered plait includes three sections of hair that are braided together from the crown of the head to the nape of the neck.

== Description ==
In the simplest form of three-strand braid, all the hair is initially divided into three sections, which are then simultaneously gathered together near the scalp. In contrast, a French braid starts with three small sections of hair near the crown of the head, which are then braided together toward the nape of the neck, gradually adding more hair to each section as it crosses in from the side into the center of the braid structure. The final result incorporates all of the hair into a smoothly woven pattern over the scalp.

If the main mass of hair is initially parted into two or more sections along the scalp that are kept separate from one another, multiple French braids may be created, each in its own section. The length of hair plays a role in the ability to braid; shorter hair can be more of a challenge. Bobby pins can be useful when braiding shorter hair or hair with many different layers to keep all of the hair in the French braid in place. There are many different ways of French braiding that make it unique; for example, a person can braid at a slant, braid into a bun, or only braid the bangs (fringe).

Compared to the simplest form of hair braid, a French braid has several practical advantages: it can restrain hair from the top of the head that is too short to reach the nape of the neck, and it spreads the weight and tension of the braid across a larger portion of the scalp. Its sleek appearance is often regarded as being elegant and sophisticated. A French braid is more difficult to construct than a simple braid because of its greater complexity. When performed on one's own hair, it also requires a more prolonged elevation of the hands above the back of the head, and leaves more tangled hair along the scalp when unbraiding.

In this style of braid, start on top of the head and braid it till the end of the hair. Braiding in this manner can be done with different braid types but the most popular are the classic braid and the fishtail braid. A sister braid to the French braid is the Spanish braid. The Spanish braid is like a French braid but in the beginning, instead of grabbing three sections of hair, only two are used.

== History ==
The phrase "French braid" appears in an 1871 issue of Arthur's Home Magazine, used in a piece of short fiction ("Our New Congressman" by March Westland) that describes it as a new hairstyle ("do up your hair in that new French braid"). However, no visual illustrations are provided for that context, making it impossible to tell whether it refers to the same hairstyle described above.

== Variations ==
Variations on this hairstyle include:

- Dutch braid: A Dutch braid (also called an inverted French braid or reverse French braid or pineapple braid) is created when the three hair sections are crossed under each other, instead of over. It results in the look of a braid standing up from the rest of the hair, instead of being under the hair.
- Fishtail braid: A fishtail braid resembles a French braid in its smoothly woven appearance, but divides the hair into only two sections instead of three. A small piece of each section is passed over to the other section over and over to form the braid. This style was called the "Grecian braid" in the 19th century.
- Variations of the French braid are also used to prepare horses' tails for showing polo and polocrosse.
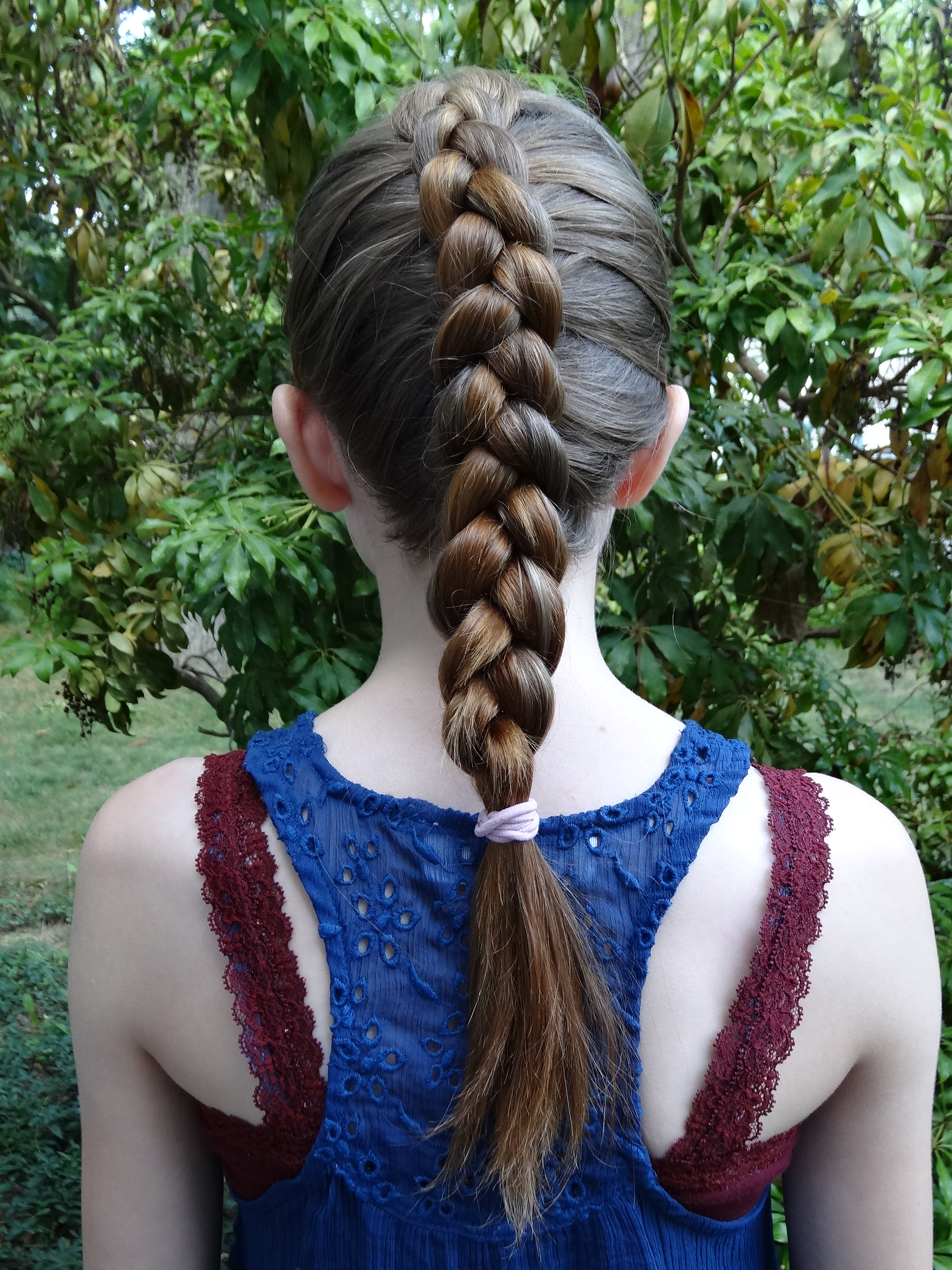
A Dutch braid, otherwise known as an inverted French braid. The braid is above the hair instead of beneath it like normal French braids.

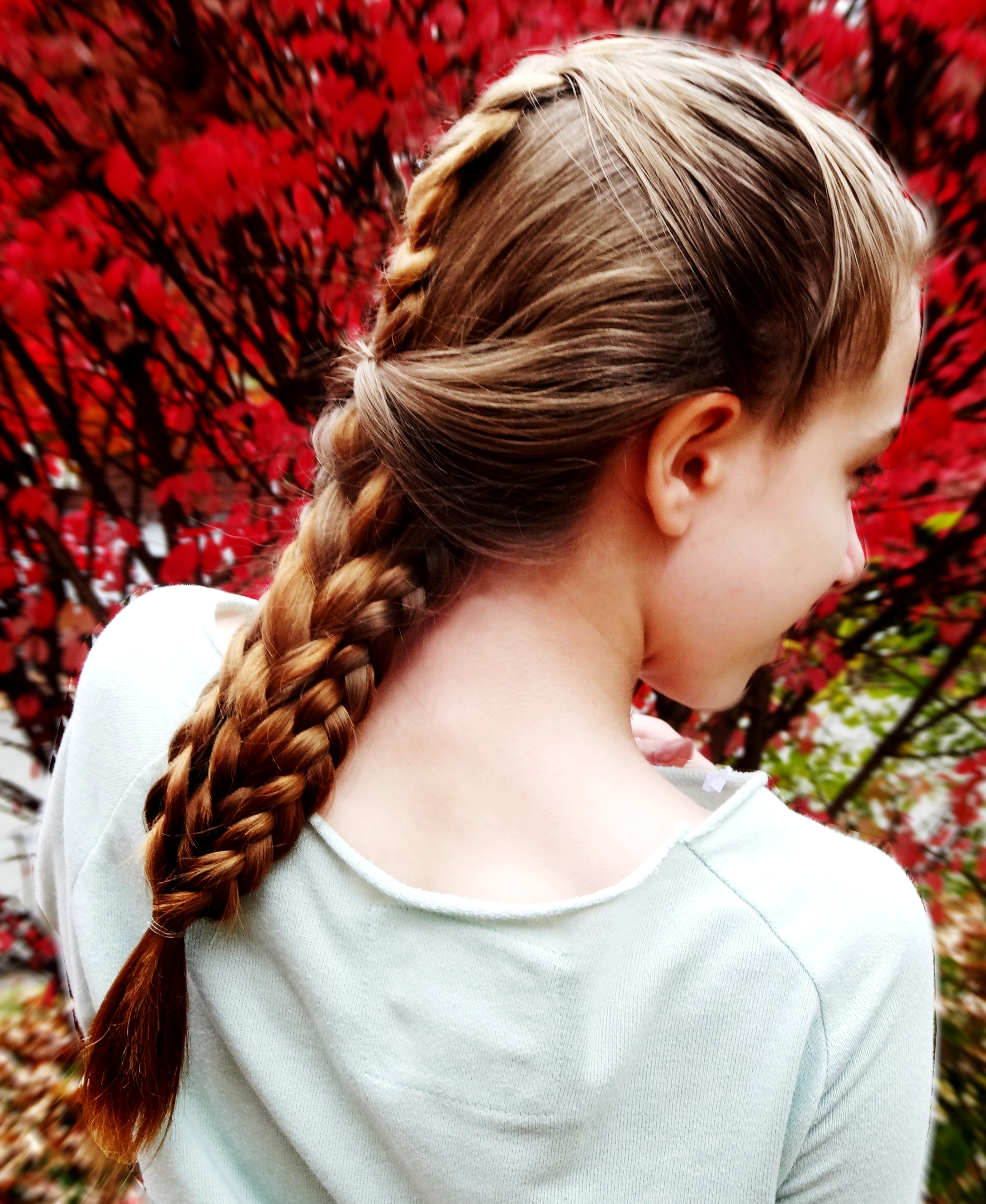
Various braids combined to look like a French and Dutch braid.

Video demonstrating Dutch braided cornrows

== See also ==
- French twist (hairstyle)
- List of hairstyles
- Ponytail
