= Kodai =

Kodai or Kōdai may refer to:

- Kōdai (given name), a masculine Japanese given name
- Kōdai or Takadai, a frame used for making kumihimo, a type of Japanese braid
- Kodaikanal, a hill station located in Dindigul district in the state of Tamil Nadu, India
- Kodai (2023), Indian Tamil-language film directed by Raajaselvam
