= Fingerloop braid =

Technique for making braided cords with loops of yarn

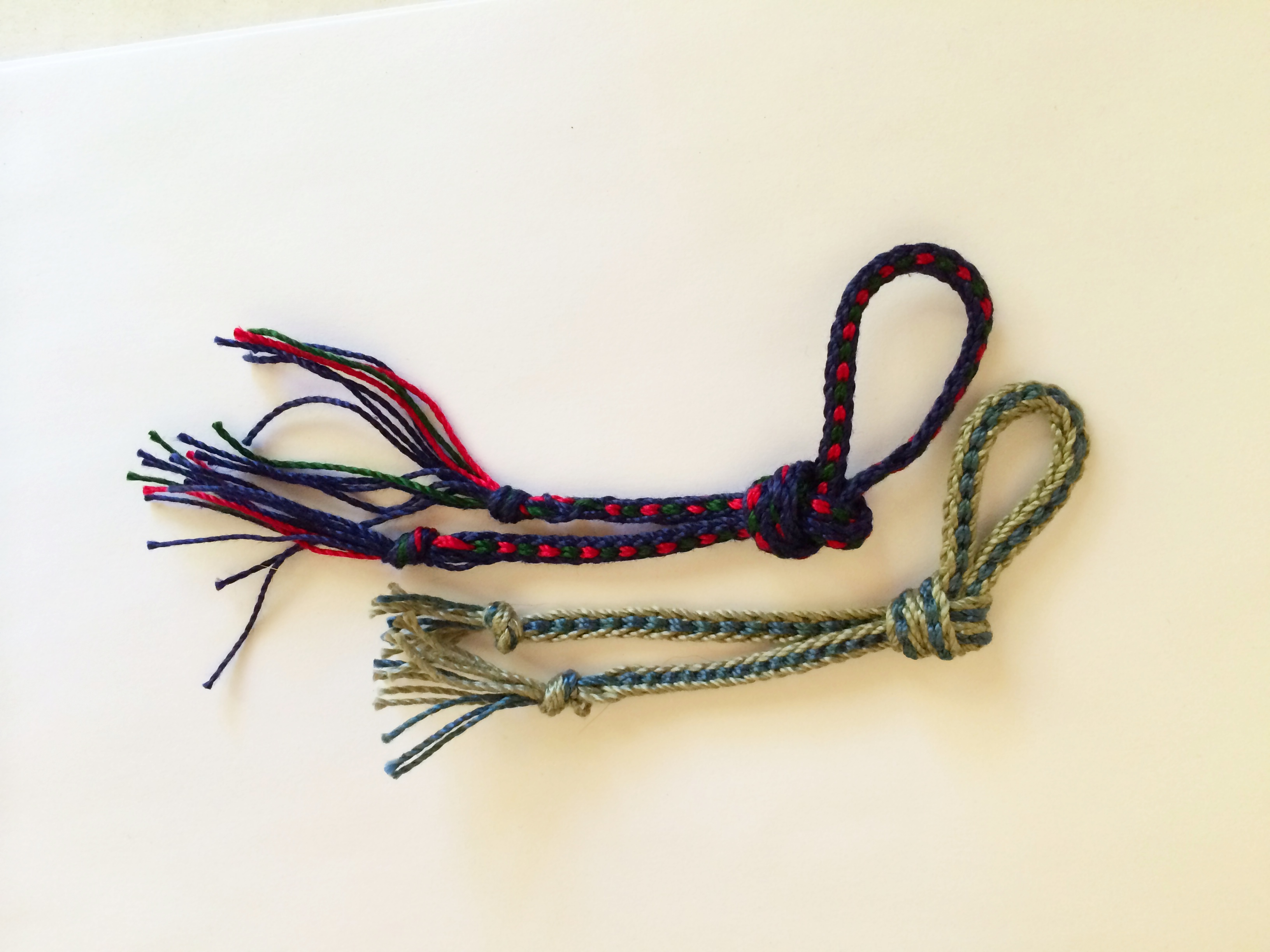
Fingerloop braids worked in the "graine d'orge" or barleycorn pattern.

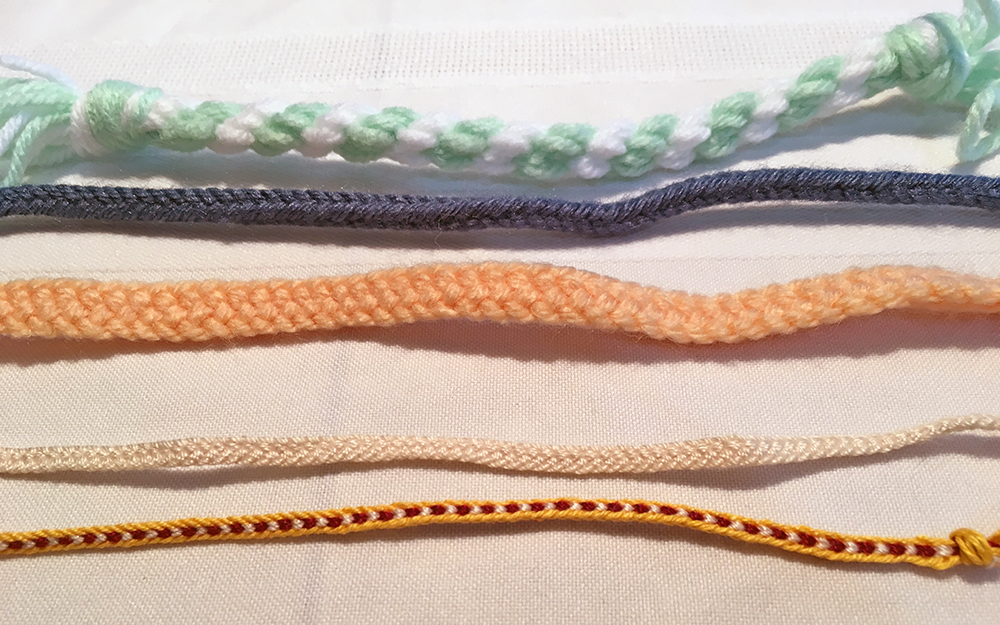
Examples of fingerloop braids. The top three are yarn. The bottom two are embroidery thread.

Fingerloop braiding is a technique of making sturdy and decorative cords from threads. It is a type of braiding known as loop manipulation. The braid is made from loops of thread, attached at a central point, and the loops placed over the fingers and interlaced in different ways.

In Europe it originated in the Middle Ages, and excavations from London have produced numerous examples in silk from between the second half of the 12th century and first half of the 15th. From the 15th century onwards, various directions and recipes for different fingerloop braid techniques began to appear in books and in print.

A related technique, which involved the loops being placed over the hand or fingers, is the Japanese kute-uchi style. This technique arose in the 7th Century, and were used through the Middle Ages to the 19th century, for uses such as tying armour.

== Uses ==
Fingerloop braids were a type of braided cord with many uses. Beginning in the 13th century, they were used for lacing up clothing for a tighter fit. They were used to hold up men's hose and to lace shoes. Braids were used to gather and tighten fabric at the neck and wrists of undergarments. Decorative cords were used to cinch purses in the same way.

Some wide and flat braids were made to be purely decorative and sewn on garments as trim.

== Materials ==
Silk was a popular choice for fingerloop braids, both for its strength and its ability to be dyed many different colors. Leather was another popular material, especially for lacing shoes and tying armor. There is evidence that wool was used. Linen and flax were likely used, but little of those materials has survived.

== See also ==
- Kumihimo
- Ply-split braiding
- Lucet
- Spool knitting
