= Lucet =

Tool for making cords or braids

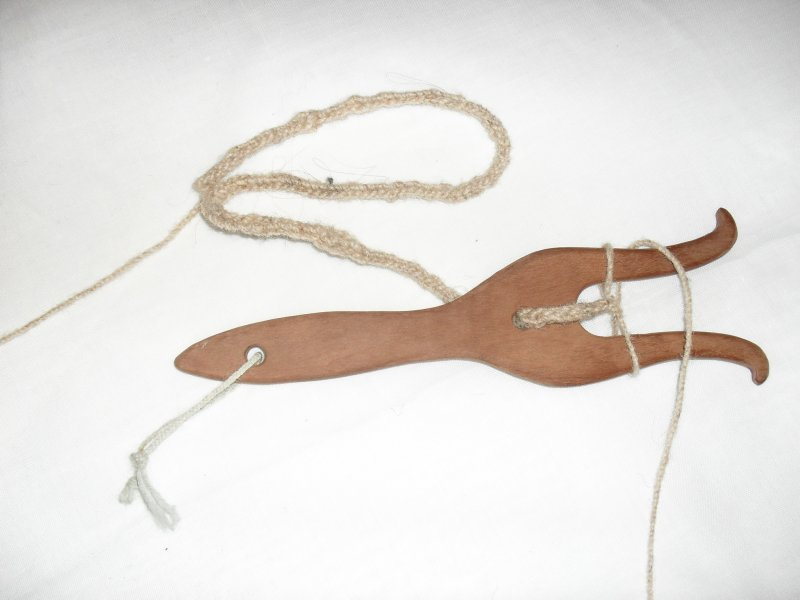
Wooden, lyre-shaped lucet, with in-progress square cord

A lucet is a tool used in cordmaking or braiding which is believed to date back to the Viking and Medieval periods, when it was used to create cords that were used on clothing, or to hang items from the belt. Lucet cord is square, strong, and slightly springy. It closely resembles knitted I-cord or the cord produced on a knitting spool. Lucet may unravel if cut, but is easily fixed with a small knot. Unlike other braiding techniques such as kumihimo, finger-loop braiding or plaiting, where the threads are of a finite length, lucetted (or knitted) (Note: The term lucet is used as a verb to describe the process of creating lucet cord, as in "to lucet", "lucetted" and "lucetting", as well as being a noun used to describe the resulting cord itself, and a noun used to describe the tool used in the cords' creation.) braids can be created without pre-measuring threads and so it is a technique suited for very long cords.

== Origins of the lucet ==
The supposed medieval lucets appear to be double-pronged hollow bones, left tubular, presumably so that the cord could be drawn through the centre hole. In contrast, a modern lucet fork is lyre-shaped, normally made of wood, with two prongs at one end and (optionally) a handle on the other. It may also have a hole through which the cord can be pulled.

The exact origins of the lucet are controversial. While it was previously suggested that its use declined after the 12th century, revived in the 17th century, then waned again in the early 19th century; the historical identification of lucets in archaeological digs is tricky. The biggest challenge in identifying ancient lucets is that their design is simple, making it difficult to distinguish from other two-pronged tools. Many presumed lucets were made from bones, branches, or antlers, and are often misidentified by archaeologists.

For example, a two-pronged 11th-century finding from Lund (Sweden) has been associated with lucetting due to its design and runic inscription. This artifact, despite having features that suggest its use in cordmaking, is debated among experts. In York, both bone and antler finds have been catalogued as lucets, although some, particularly the antler finds, are considered too impractical for weaving due to their divergent prongs and wear marks consistent with pendants.

The absence of a universally recognized shape for a lucet further complicates this identification. Findings range from hollow bones with two prongs, sometimes bearing a third larger prong, to small flat tools. Artifacts associated with medieval textile crafts, such as those found in Sigtuna (Sweden), Wandignies-Hamage (France), and other Northern European sites, have been re-examined through experimental archaeology, supporting their potential use as lucets, although doubts persist. Despite this, the term 'lucet' has been applied to similar objects, especially those found in textile-related contexts.

== Construction of lucet braid ==
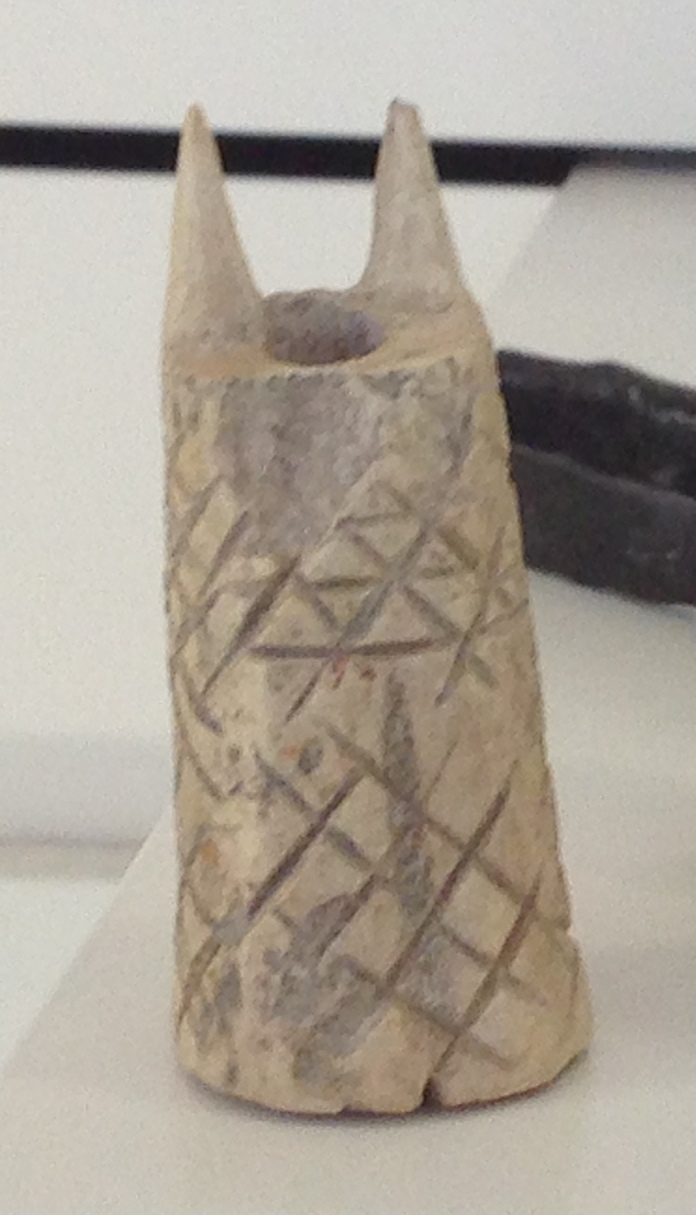
10th-century lucet spool from northern France

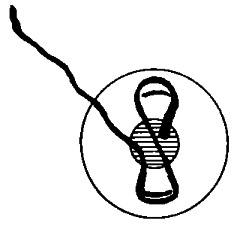

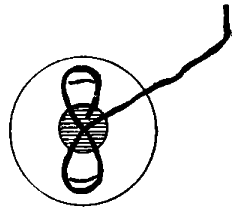

A number of techniques exist for the creation of lucet cord, all of which produce slightly different cords; it is possible to produce a two-coloured cord by using two strands of differently-coloured yarn. The only materials necessary to lucet are yarn and a lucet fork, also known as a chain fork or a lucet. Skewer-like sticks or knitting needles can be used to pull the yarn over as an additional tool. Lucets can be bought in shops as kits designed for children.

To cast on, the yarn is put through the hole in the lucet from the front, and the yarn in front of the lucet is wound around the prongs twice, in a figure-of-eight motion. The two lower loops are then lifted over the two upper loops, using either the fingers or a stick, until they are lifted over the 'horns' of the lucet fork, after which the thread behind the lucet is pulled to tighten the knot. The process is then repeated, this time (and every time after) winding the yarn just once around the prongs, as there is already a figure-of-eight of yarn on the fork.

When the desired length of lucet cord is reached, the lucet can be cast off by carefully lifting the loops off the prongs, passing the remaining thread through them, and pulling the knot tight. Any loose thread can be cut off with scissors, or tied together to form a closed circle. The cord can be wrapped around the lucet handle as it grows.

Lucet cord can be used for decorative edging, draw-strings, lacing, and any other use where a strong cord is needed.

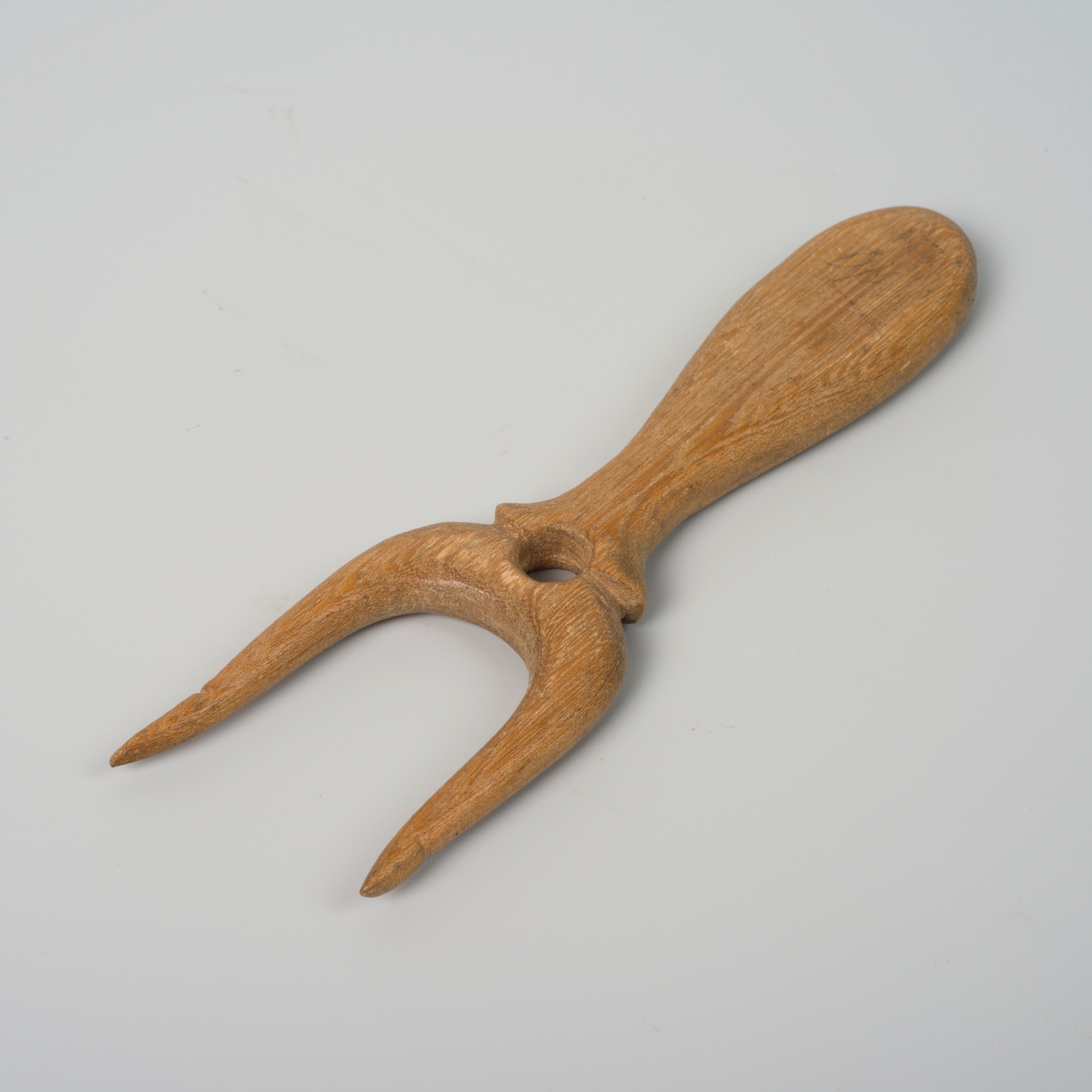

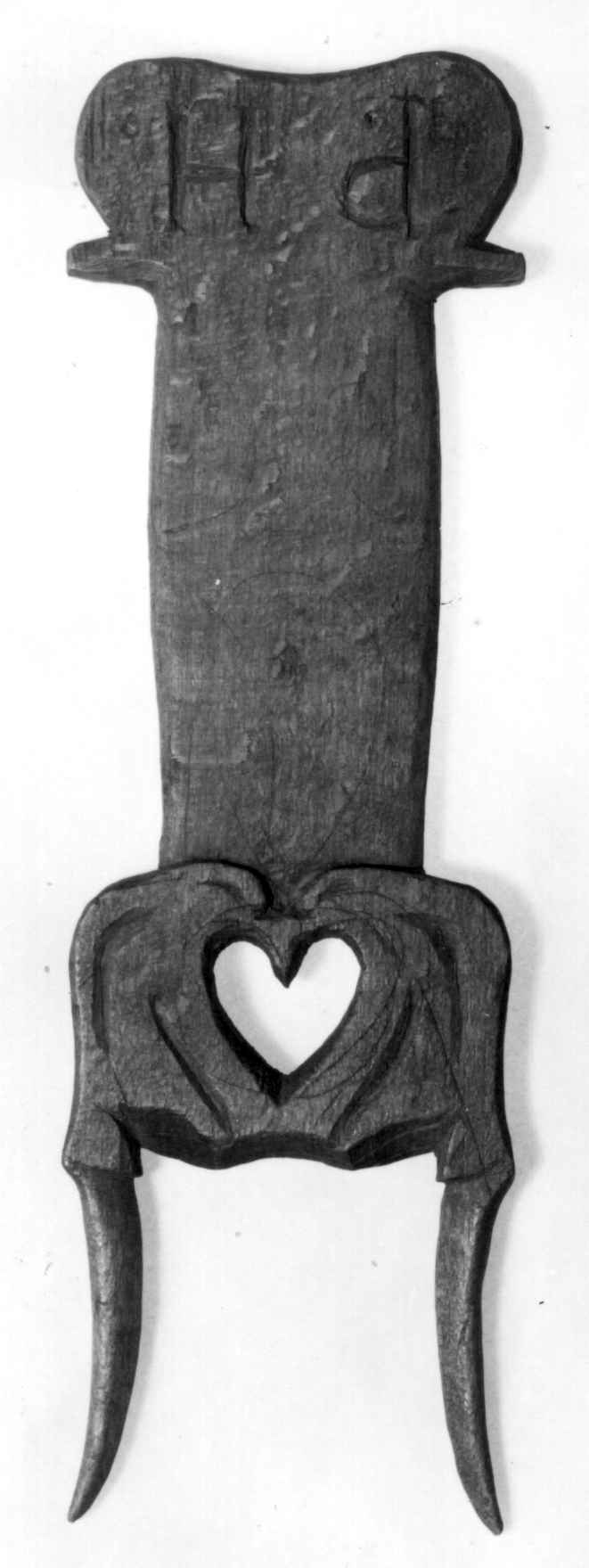

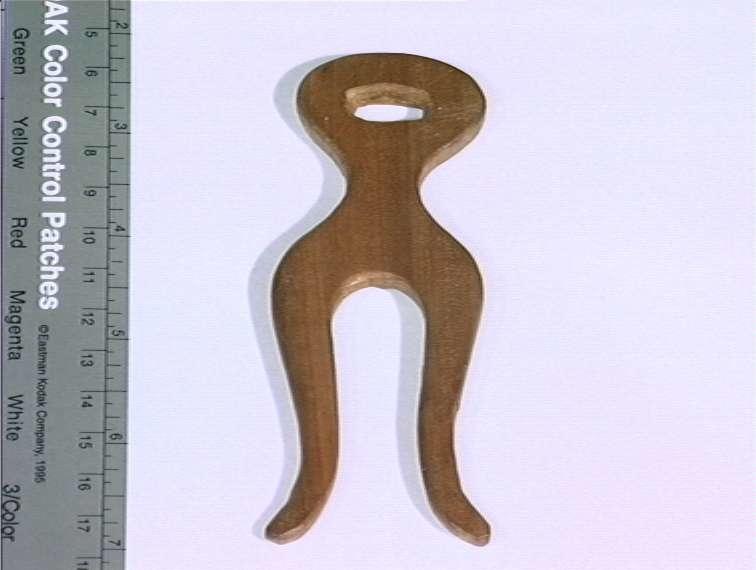

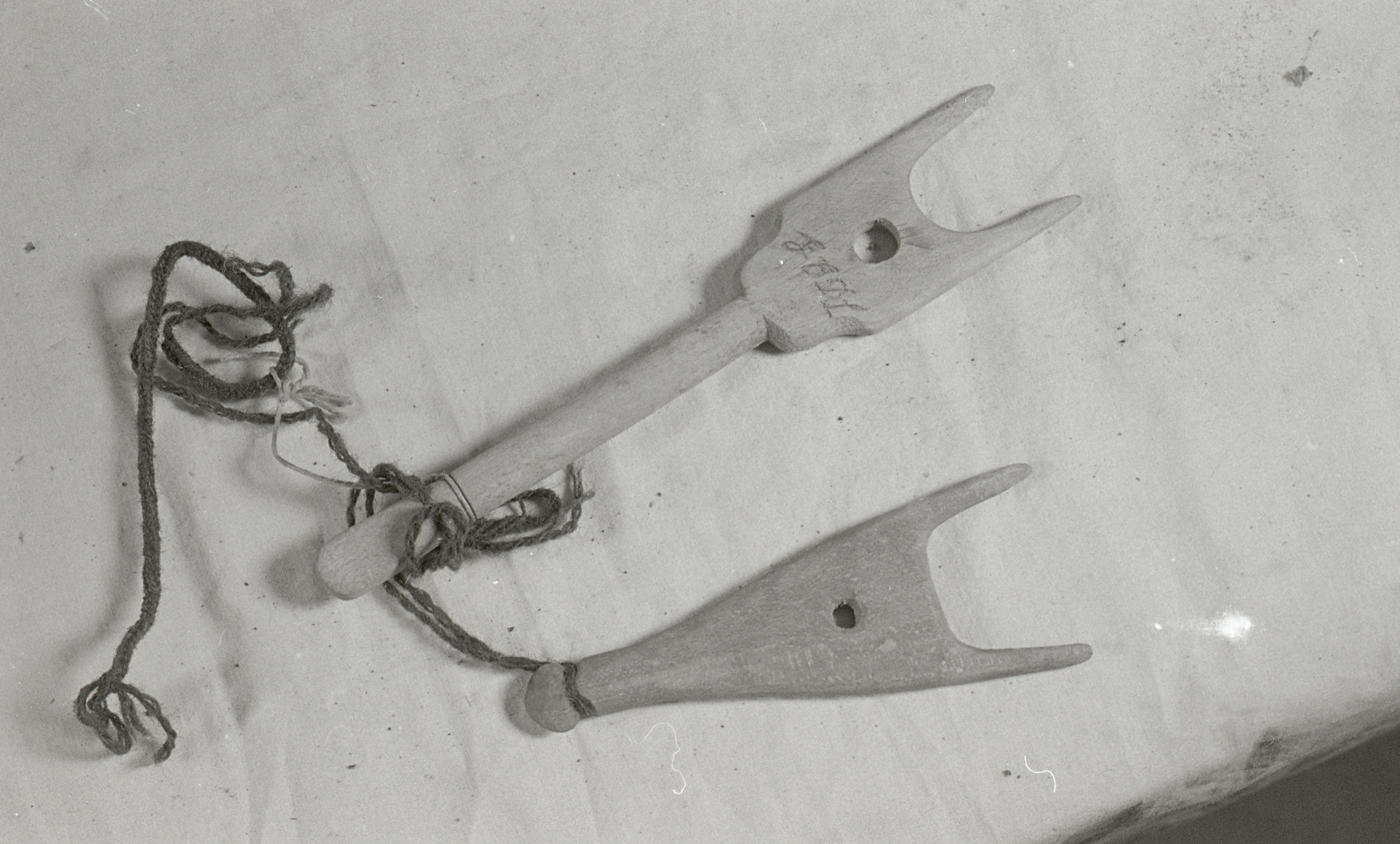

== See also ==
- Spool knitting, more general, with two or more horns.
