= Corking =

Corking may refer to:

- A physiological plant disorder in stone fruit
- Cork (material), a material harvested from the Cork oak tree
- Cork taint, a wine defect
- Spool knitting, a knitting technique
- The process of inserting a stopper into the opening of a bottle
- In baseball, the act of making a Corked bat
- A game in which a cork being dropped in a players drink results in the player being required to "skull" said drink.
- A game in which one uses a mallet to strike the underside of a small, 2'x4'x2' wooden table, resulting in a cork (on the top side of the table) to launch upward. The player that launches the cork the highest wins. Originated in East India.
- Corking, a tactic used during Critical Mass bicycling events to maintain group cohesion.
