= Marudai =

Tool used in kumihimo braiding

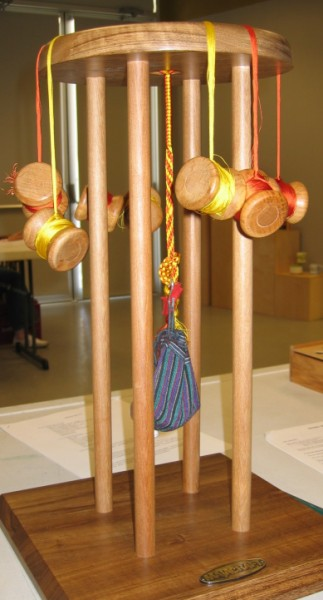

A marudai (丸台, lit. 'round stand') is the most common of the traditional frames used for making kumihimo, a type of Japanese braid.

== Etymology ==
The marudai is generally made of a close-grained wood and consists of a round disk (kagami or "mirror") with a hole in the center, supported by four legs set in a base. The Japanese style marudai is often about 16 in (41 cm) high and is used while kneeling or when placed on a table. The Western style 26 in (66 cm) marudai allows the braider to sit in a chair to braid.

The warp threads that form the braid are wound around weighted bobbins called tama (lit. 'egg'). Tama were once made of clay, but now are most commonly wood filled with lead. The weight of the tama maintains even tension on the warp threads, and is balanced by a bag of counterweights called omori that is attached to the base of the braid.

Modern braiders often replace the marudai with a foam disk with numbered slots that tightly grip the warp threads to maintain warp tension, so that weighted bobbins are not needed; instead, flexible plastic bobbins are used to prevent tangling of the threads. Unlike kumihimo disks, marudai have no indication of where the thread should be placed; it is done freehand.

== Related terms ==
- Kagami – "Mirror", the polished wooden top disk of the marudai.
- Kongō Gumi – a class of patterns for round cord all involving eight threads folded in half for a total of sixteen strands. In clockwise order, each bobbins is moved to the opposite side. When different combinations of thread color are used, many interesting patterns emerge, including diagonal stripes, diamonds on a background, triangles resembling hearts, and tiny six-petalled flowers. Kongō Gumi is named for the venerable Kongō Gumi company of Japan, the oldest known company in the world.
- Kumihimo or kumi himo – Japanese for "gathered threads".
- Obi – the broad cloth sash worn with kimono; kumihimo braids are often used as obijime, worn on top of the obi.
- Obijime – the cord used to fasten the obi securely in some obi styles. Usually one string of kumihimo is tied around the obi securely, and an accessory called the obidome is often added in front for decoration.
- Omori – Counterweights used in kumihimo braiding.
- Takadai – a rectangular or square frame for kumihimo.
- Tama – little spools. The thread is kept from unwinding by passing the thread under itself, forming a loop around the tama.
- True silk – a hollow fiber with a rough surface that resists slipping past the loop unless gently pulled. For synthetic fibers, a flexible plastic "clamshell" bobbin may be preferable.

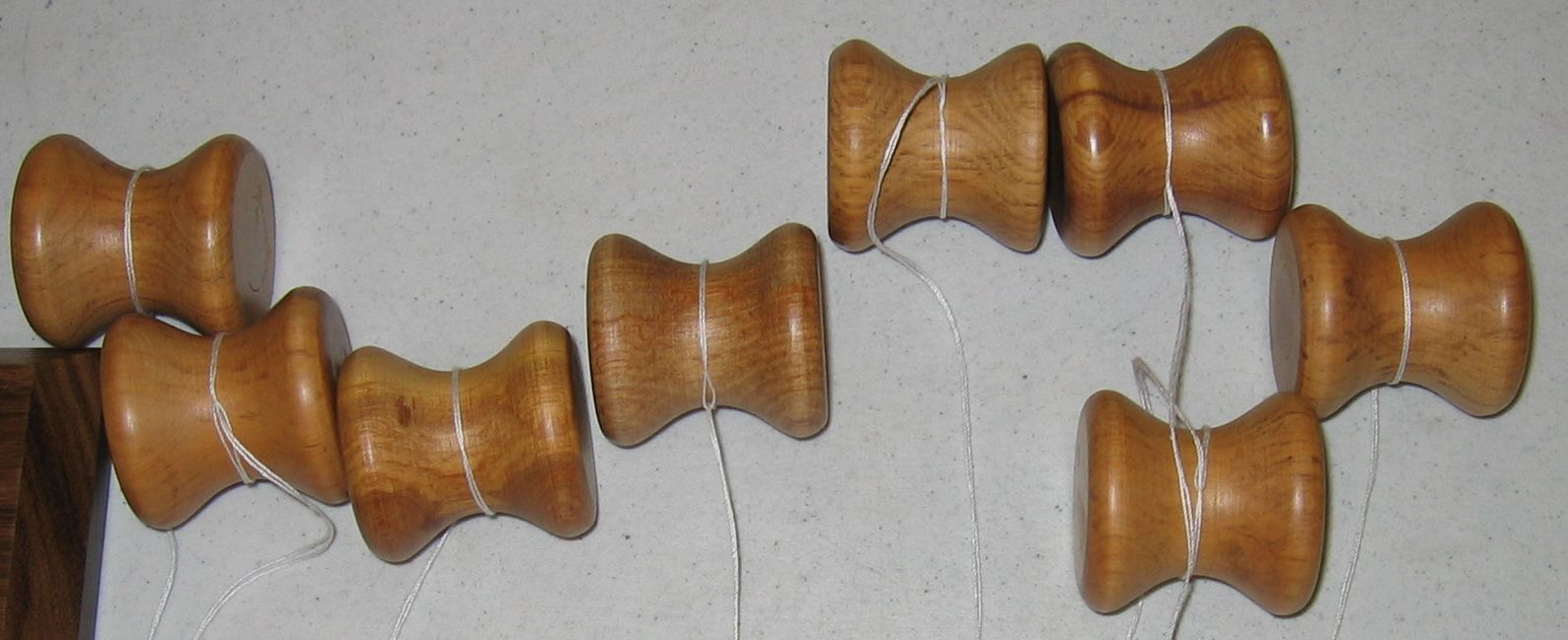
A number of tama in use.

Example kumihimo of several different styles.
