= Kōdai (given name) =

- Gender: Male

Origin
- Origin: Japanese
- Meaning: Different meanings depending on the kanji used

Kōdai, Kodai, Koudai or Kohdai (こうだい or コウダイ) is a masculine Japanese given name. Notable people with the name include:

== Written forms ==
Forms in kanji can include:

- 広大, "wide/broad/spacious, large/big"
- 弘大, "vast/broad/wide, large/big"
- 功大, "achievement/merits/success/honor/credit, large/big"
- 幸大, "happiness/blessing/fortune, large/big"
- 滉大, "deep and broad, large/big"
- 昴大, "The Pleiades, large/big"
- 晃大, "clear, large/big"
- 航大, "navigate/sail/cruise/fly, large/big"
- 廣大, "broad/wide/spacious, large/big"

== People ==
- Kodai Dohi (土肥 航大; born 2001), Japanese footballer
- Kodai Fujii (藤井 航大; born 1991), Japanese footballer
- Kodai Hagino (萩野 滉大; born 2000), Japanese footballer
- Kodai Hamaya (濱矢 廣大; born 1993), Japanese baseball player
- Kodai Ichihara (市原 弘大; born 1982), Japanese golfer
- Kodai Iida (飯田 昴大; born 1994), Japanese footballer
- Kodai Matsumoto (松本 幸大; born 1980), Japanese baseball player
- Kodai Naraoka (奈良岡 功大; born 2001), Japanese badminton player
- Kōdai Sakai (酒井広大; born 1989), Japanese voice actor
- Kodai Sakamoto (坂本 広大; born 1995), Japanese footballer
- Kodai Sakurai (桜井 広大; born 1983), Japanese baseball player
- Kodai Sato (佐藤 幸大; born 1985), Japanese footballer
- Kodai Senga (千賀 滉大; born 1993), Japanese baseball player
- Koudai Tsukakoshi (塚越 広大; born 1986), Japanese racing driver
- Kōdai Umetsu (梅津 晃大; born 1996), Japanese baseball player
- Kodai Watanabe (渡辺 広大; born 1986), Japanese footballer
- Kodai Yasuda (安田 晃大; born 1989), Japanese footballer
