= Kumihimo =

Traditional Japanese artform of making cords and braids

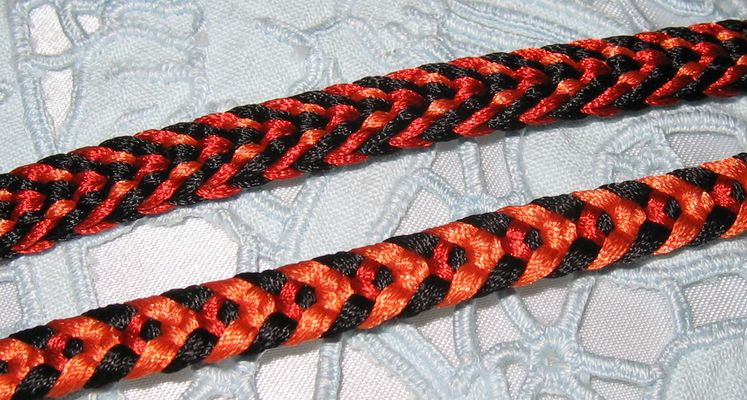
Kumihimo braid

Kumihimo (組み紐) is a traditional Japanese artform and craftwork for making braids and cords. In the past, kumihimo decorations were used as accessories for kimono as well as samurai armor. Japanese braiding, as kumihimo is sometimes known in English, is also associated with Shinto rituals and religious services. Literally meaning "gathered threads", kumihimo are made by interlacing reels of yarn, commonly silk, with the use of traditional, specialised looms – either a marudai (丸台, lit. 'round stand') or a takadai (高台) (also known as a kōdai).

There are a number of different styles of kumihimo weaving, which variously create a braided cord ranging from very flat to almost entirely rounded. Kumihimo cords are used as obijime, cords worn belted around the front of some obi when wearing kimono.

== History ==
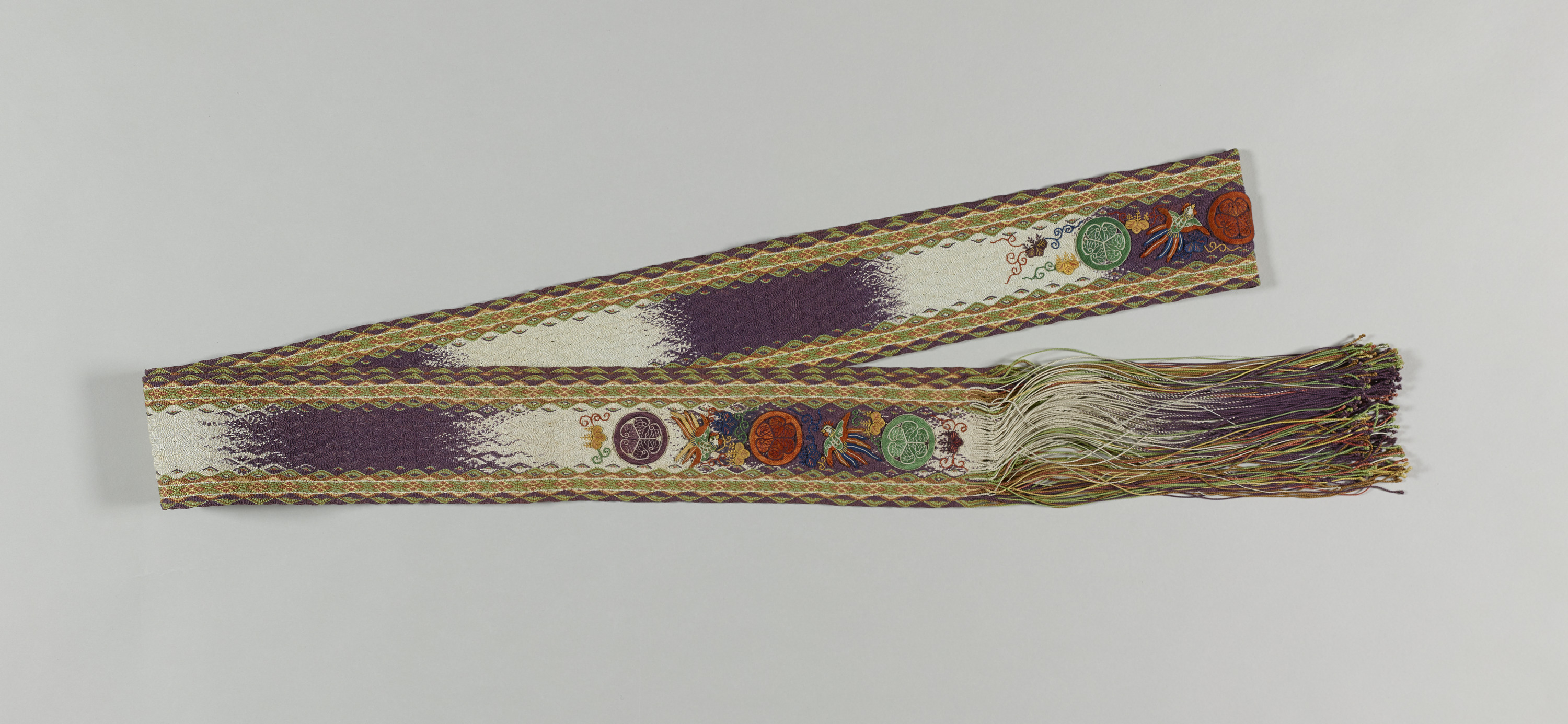
Sageo cord for tachi (Japanese long sword) made of kumihimo, with Tokugawa clan mon, Edo period

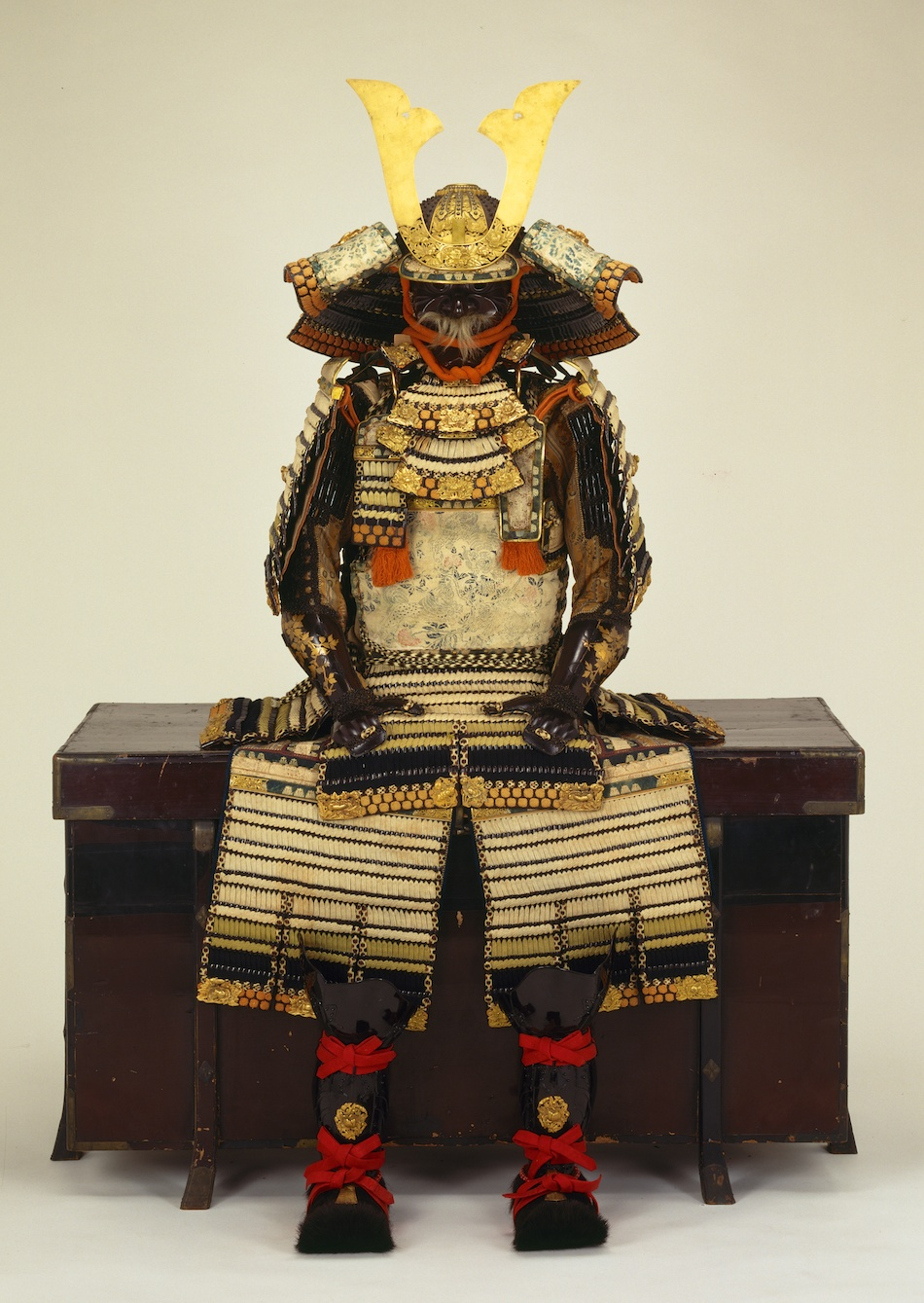
Ō-yoroi decorated with kumihimo owned by Shimazu Nariakira

During the Jomon period, primitive braids appeared that could be considered the predecessors of kumihimo, or Japan's first kumihimo. During this period, braids were used to create patterns on Jomon pottery, and the indentations of the braids attached to the clay became the decoration of the pottery.

Kumihimo, which falls into the category of crafts, was introduced to Japan from China via the Korean peninsula around 700 AD. When the art first arrived in Japan, it was used to decorate Buddhist scrolls and other votive items. The city of Nara emerged as a centre of cultural and artistic exchange and became the point of introductory of kumihimo to Japan.

When regular trade and cultural exchange with China ceased Heian period (794-1185), kumihimo culture flourished, combining several earlier techniques to create a uniquely Japanese design that was more complex than before. From the mid-Heian period, kumihimo was also used to decorate ō-yoroi, the Japanese armour worn by samurai. In addition to functionality, the aesthetics of the ō-yoroi were considered important, and sometimes 300 meters of kumihimo were used for each piece of armor. Kumihimo was also used to tie tachi (Japanese long sword) and harnesses around the waist. From the late Heian period, nioi-odoshi (匂威) and susogo (裾濃), a weaving technique characterized by gradations of color, appeared.

During the Kamakura period (1185-1333), various new weaving techniques for kumihimo appeared. Kikko-gumi (亀甲組), which imitates the pattern of a turtle shell, appeared for the first time in this period and was used as kumihimo for armor.

During the Muromachi period (1333-1573), kumihimo was used as a decorative weave for teaware used in the Japanese tea ceremony. Taking advantage of the wabi-sabi aesthetic that emerged during this period, this weaving method became popular for designs that were more subdued yet prestigious than the more traditional and flamboyant designs. During this period, dan-odoshi (段威), a weaving technique using different colors in a striped pattern, appeared.

During the Azuchi-Momoyama period (1568-1600), a weaving technique called mongara-odoshi (紋柄威), in which mon (family emblem) and designs were expressed in two colors, appeared.

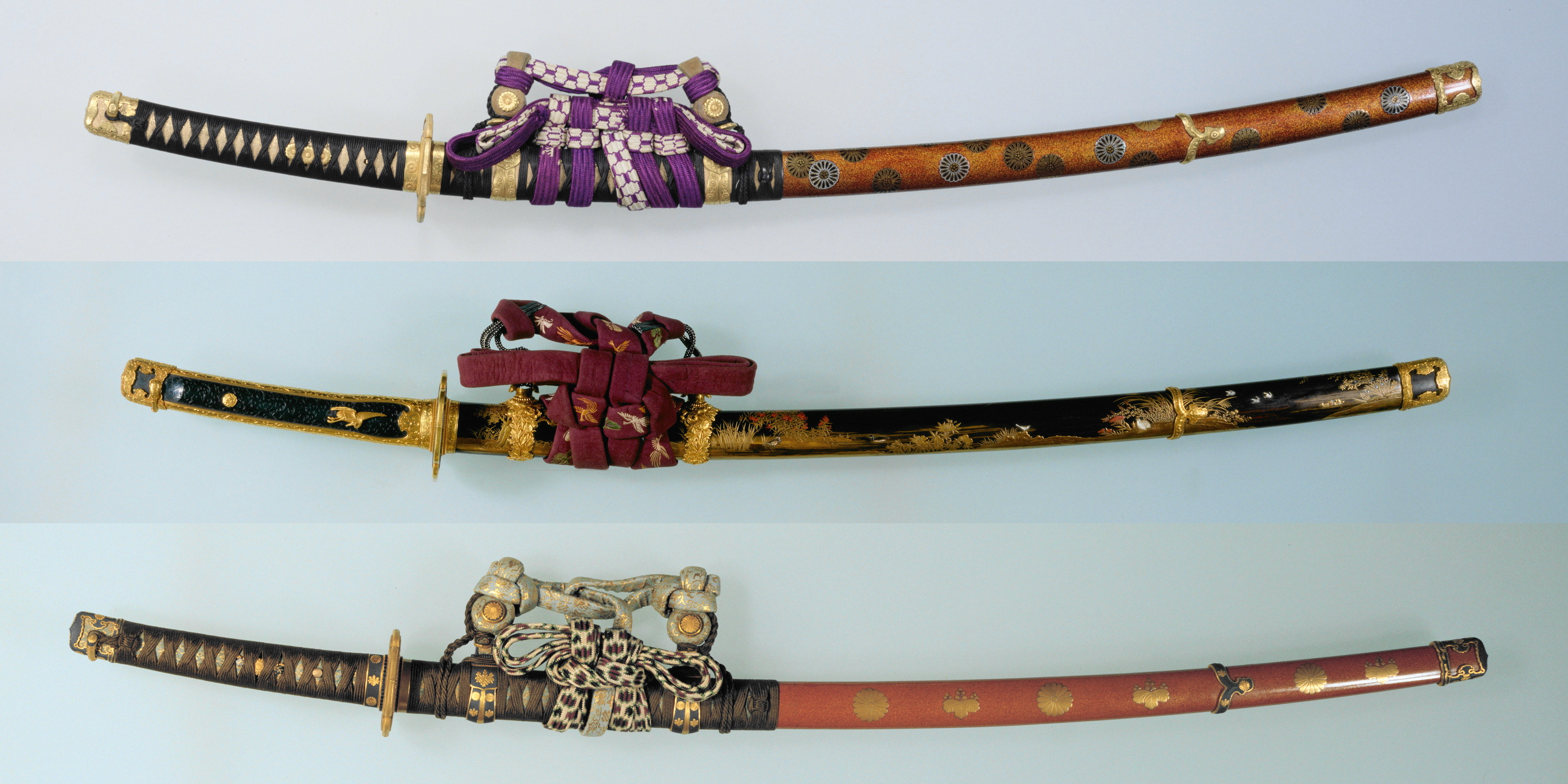
Three tachi decorated with kumihimo (sageo cords), Edo period

During the Edo period (1603-1867), with the advent of a more peaceful society, the aesthetic value of Japanese swords became increasingly important. As the demand for kumihimo for Japanese swords increased, frames called takadai and naikidai were invented to make kumihimo, and the technique of braiding developed dramatically, giving rise to many new techniques. Kumihimo spread to the general public chōnin class and was used as braids and cords for attaching haori (traditional Japanese jacket), inro (traditional Japanese portable case), and netsuke. During this period, geisha began to use the otaiko-musubi (御太鼓結び) knot to tie obi (kimono belt), which spread to the general public and dramatically increased the decorative value of the obi. As a result, decorative kumihimo were used as obijime to support the obi. The technique of ayadashi (綾出), which produces patterns and characters on the kumihimo, appeared during this period, and various new methods of weaving patterns appeared along with the popularity of the iki aesthetic.

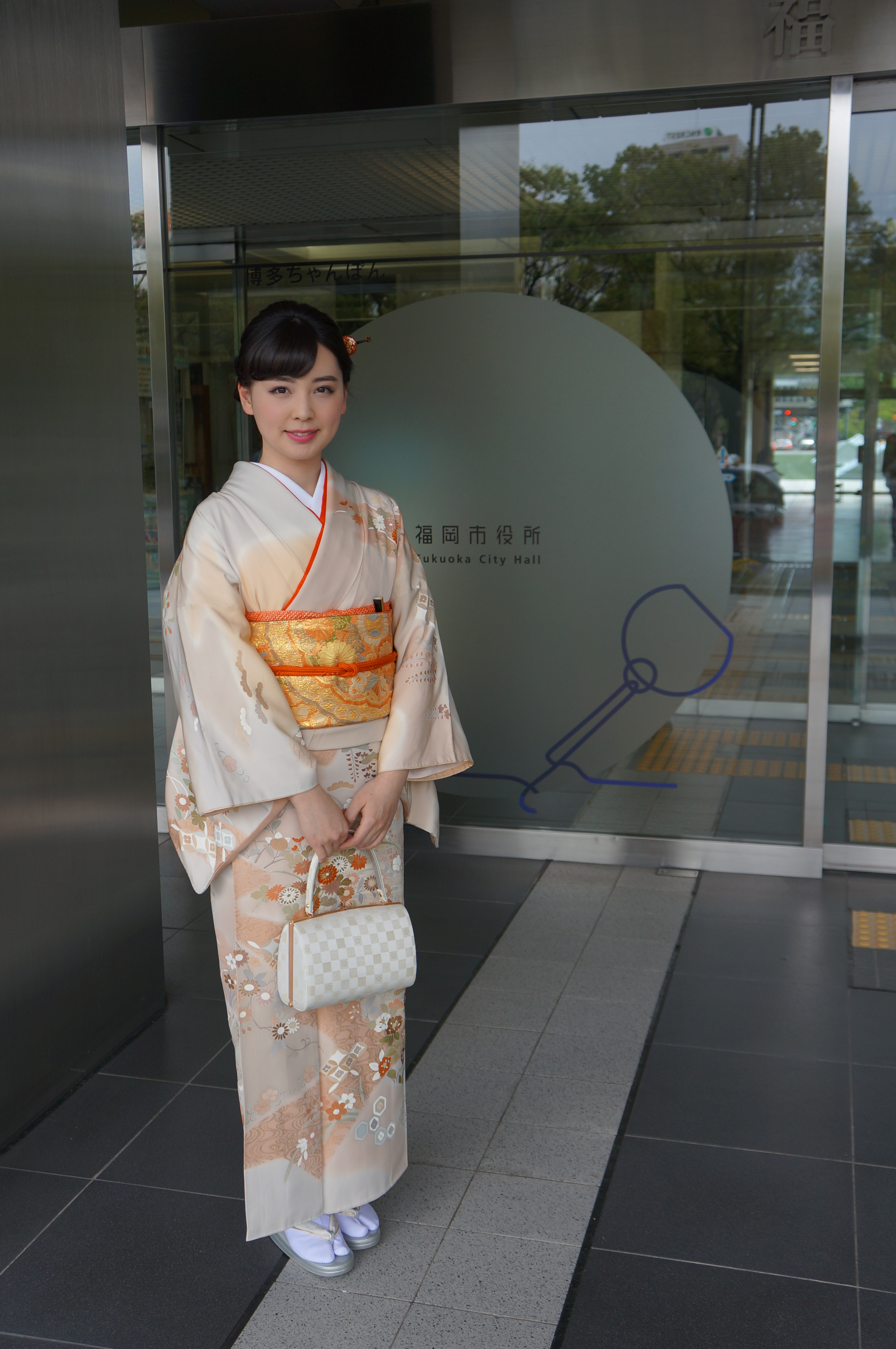
A vermilion obijime tied over the kimono and obi

During the Meiji era (1868-1912), the demand for kumihimo to decorate Japanese swords decreased drastically due to the Sword Abolishment Edict and the disappearance of the samurai class. After that, kumihimo survived mainly as obijime to support obi.

Kumihimo braids were first created by using fingerloop braiding to weave different yarns together. Later, tools such as the marudai and the takadai were developed, allowing more complex braids to be woven in a shorter amount of time.

== Modern kumihimo: 20th and 21st centuries ==
Japanese braiding is being used in other areas in addition to its traditional uses, and has been taken up by arts and craft communities outside of Japan. Kumihimo has gained in popularity outside of Japan, with an increasing number of beginner books available in languages other than Japanese. There is also a Journal of the American Kumihimo Society.

In contrast to the interest in Japanese braiding as a craft for all, the city of Columbus, Georgia, USA, commissioned Junichi Arai (1932–2017) to create a permanent 12 × 9 metre metallic fibre artwork consisting of 200 stainless steel kumihimo braidings that produced kinetic waves. Arai is considered an important innovator who raised textiles from craft to art. Akiko Moriyama describes him thus: "Arai embodies everything about Japanese textiles, from the challenges to the possibilities." Arai's installation opened at for the River Center for Performing Arts in 2003.

In the present day, modern variations of kumihimo weaving discs exist, typically made of firm, dense foam with (typically) 32 notches around the edge, creating the tension necessary for weaving kumihimo. These discs are considered to be a more affordable and portable alternative to a traditional marudai, with many different sizes and shapes of disc available for purchase.

However, a modern foam kumihimo disc is considered less versatile than a traditional marudai. A traditional marudai allows the weaver to use as many yarns of as many thicknesses as desired, and to create braids which are flat, four sided, or hollow. A foam kumihimo disc constrains the weaver to no more than 32 yarns that must not be thicker than the notch allows, and does not enable the creation of flat braids. To make a flat braid a separate rectangular or square "disc" must be made or purchased.

== Types ==
The three prominent types of kumihimo are kado-uchi himo (角打ち紐), typically with a square cross-section and usually used as obi-shime to hold kimono sashes in place, hira-uchi himo (平打紐), flat and also used as obi-shime (as well as decorating tea utensils), and round, rope-like maru-uchi himo (丸打紐).

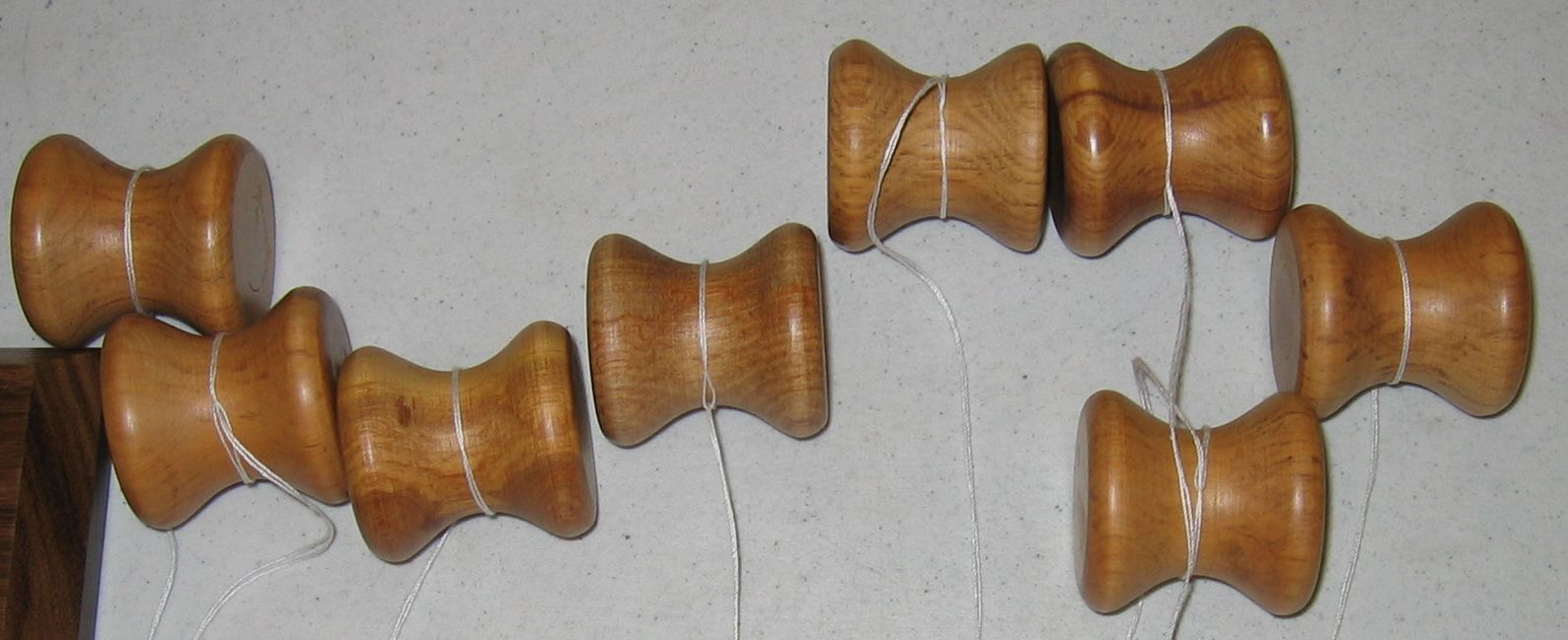
Tama bobbins

== Related terms ==
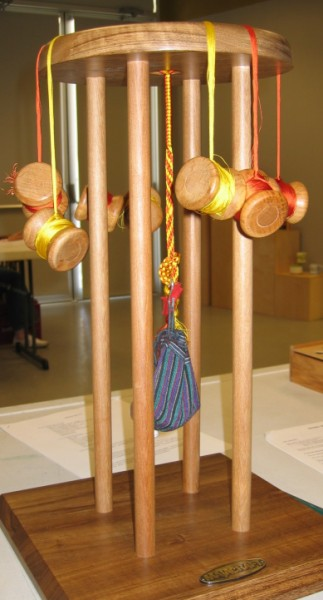
A marudai stand featuring a partially finished kumihimo, weighted with a tama (lit. 'ball') weight to keep tension whilst weaving

- Kagami – the top braiding surface on a marudai; Japanese for "mirror".
- Kongō Gumi – a class of patterns for round cord all involving eight threads folded in half for a total of sixteen strands. In clockwise order, each bobbin is moved to the opposite side. When different combinations of thread color are used, many interesting patterns emerge, including diagonal stripes, diamonds on a background, triangles resembling hearts, and tiny six-petalled flowers.
- Marudai or maru dai – the frame for the braiding; maru dai Japanese for "round stand".
- Mizuhiki, decorative cords used to decorate objects such as shūgi-bukuro envelopes.
- Obijime – the broad cloth sash used in traditional dress; a kumihimo belt, called the obijime, is tied around the obi.
- Takadai – a takadai is a large, rectangular frame for creating flat, oblique kumihimo braids.
- Tama – bobbins. The thread is kept from unwinding by passing the thread under itself, forming a loop around the tama. True silk is a hollow fiber with a rough surface that resists slipping past the loop unless gently pulled. For synthetic fibers, a flexible plastic "clamshell" bobbin may be preferable.

== See also ==
- Braiding
- Chinese knotting
- Chinese button knot
- Frog (fastening)
- Macramé
- Mizuhiki
- Obijime
- Shimenawa
- Hojōjutsu
- Shūgi-bukuro
- Spool knitting
- List of Traditional Crafts of Japan
