= Takadai =

A takadai (高台), also called kōdai, is a frame used for making kumihimo, a type of Japanese braid. The braids created on the takadai are flat (3D effects can be achieved) as opposed to the braids created on the marudai which have a round or polygonal section. The threads are attached to weighted bobbins called tamas and lay on wood pieces with pegs that are called koma. A wooden sword is used to lightly beat the braid once the braiding has been done. The braiding progresses on a 'V' front, as opposed to weaving on a regular loom that progresses on a straight front.

The art that is worked on the takadai is a braid, not a weave. Although many of the patterns used on this braiding stand resemble the up and down motion of a weave, since each thread takes a turn at being both the weft and the warp, it is a braid.

On the takadai it is possible to make intricate patterns using a technique called "pick-up braids". The braid has two sides of two contrasting colors and is usually linked on the edges. Then a pattern is formed by interchanging strands from the bottom braid to the upper braid, and by changing the braiding sequence.

== Cultural context ==
The takadai is one of several traditional stands used in kumihimo, the Japanese craft of making braided cords. Kumihimo developed in Japan from braiding techniques introduced from continental Asia, and early uses included the decoration of Buddhist objects and scrolls. Over time, kumihimo cords were also used for samurai armour, sword fittings, kimono accessories, and "obijime", the cord used to secure an "obi"

Flat kumihimo cords, known as "hira-uchi himo", are one of the major forms of kumihimo and are used for purposes such as kimono sashes, sword decoration, tea utensils, and accessories.

== Related terms ==
- Kumihimo 組紐 - "kumi" from the Japanese verb, "kumu," meaning "to braid." "Himo" means "cord" or "string." May be written as くみひも、組紐、組み紐。
- Marudai- 丸台 - a wooden braiding stand with a circular top (kagami) which is pierced with a center hole. It is used to make a variety of braids, including round, square, rectangular, flat, triangular, and other polygonal shapes.
- Obi - 帯 - a sash of varying widths, used to secure a kimono.
- Obijime - 帯締め - the cord used to secure the obi.
- Tama - 玉 - weighted wooden bobbins used in all types of kumihimo except Karakumi. The weight provides tension on the threads; this is countered by another weight suspended from the braid underneath the kagami.
- Koma - movable pegged supports used on a takadai to hold and organize the threads.

== Books ==
- Making Kumihimo, Japanese interlaced braids, by Rodrick Owen
- Comprehensive Treatrise of Braids V, Taka-dai braids 3, by Makiko Tada
