= Kodai Sakurai =

Japanese baseball player (born 1983)

Kodai Sakurai 桜井 広大
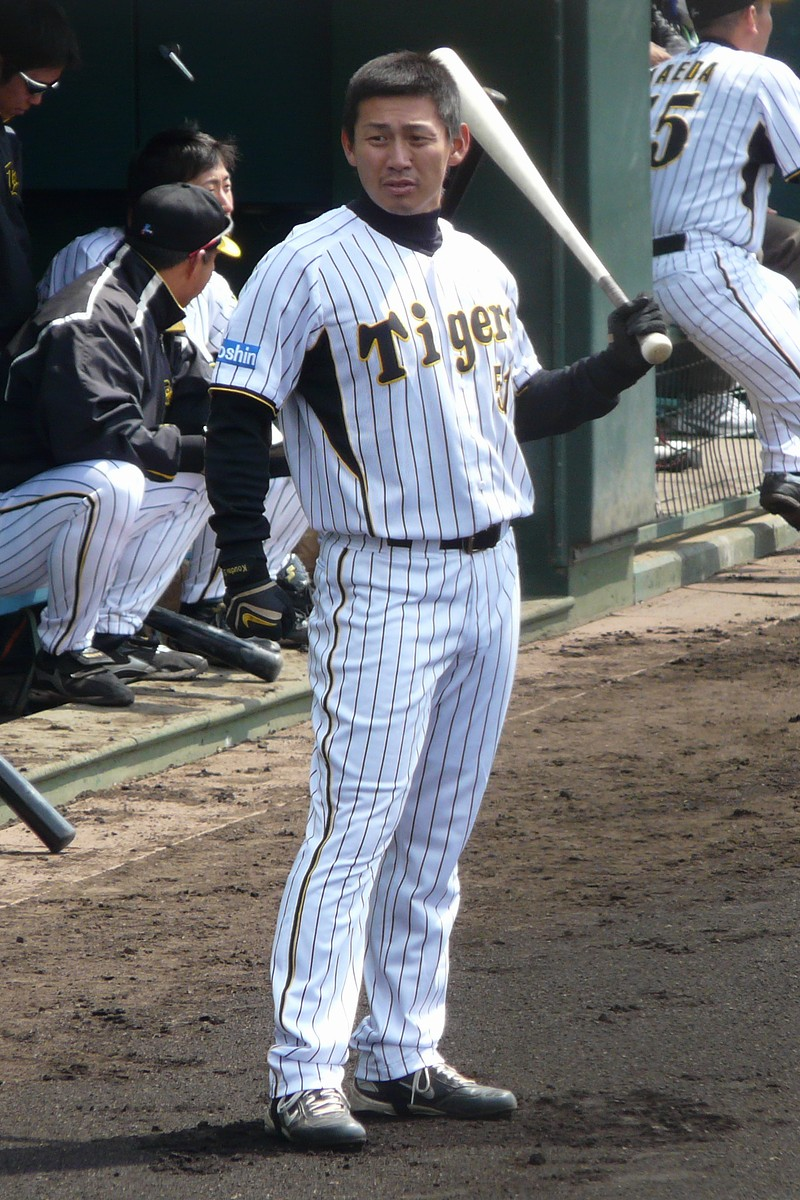
- outfielder
- Born: July 1, 1983 (age 42); Yasu, Shiga, Japan
- Bats: Right Throws: Right

NPB debut
- May 18, 2007, for the Hanshin Tigers

NPB statistics (through 2011)
- Batting average: .273
- Hits: 225
- Home runs: 30
- RBIs: 116
- Stats at Baseball Reference

Teams
- Hanshin Tigers (2002 – 2011)
- Last updated on: January 21, 2012

Kodai Sakurai (桜井 広大, Sakurai Kōdai; born July 1, 1983) is a Japanese former baseball player from Yasu, Shiga Prefecture.

== Biography ==
=== Early years ===
Kodai Sakurai started baseball in his 3rd year in an elementary school. He entered PL Gakuen High School in 1999 and played in the 82nd Japanese High School Baseball Championship in his second year at the high school. He was drafted by the Tigers in 2001.

=== Nippon Professional Baseball ===
He played only in the Western League for 5 years because Norihiro Akahoshi, Tomoaki Kanemoto, Osamu Hamanaka, Shinjiro Hiyama and other outfielders played in the Central League. He got the batting average of .350 in 2005 and .291 in 2006.

His first appearance in the Central League (professional debut) was on May 18, 2007. He got over 10 home runs per season for the first time in 2009 season.
