= Spool knitting =

Form of knitting

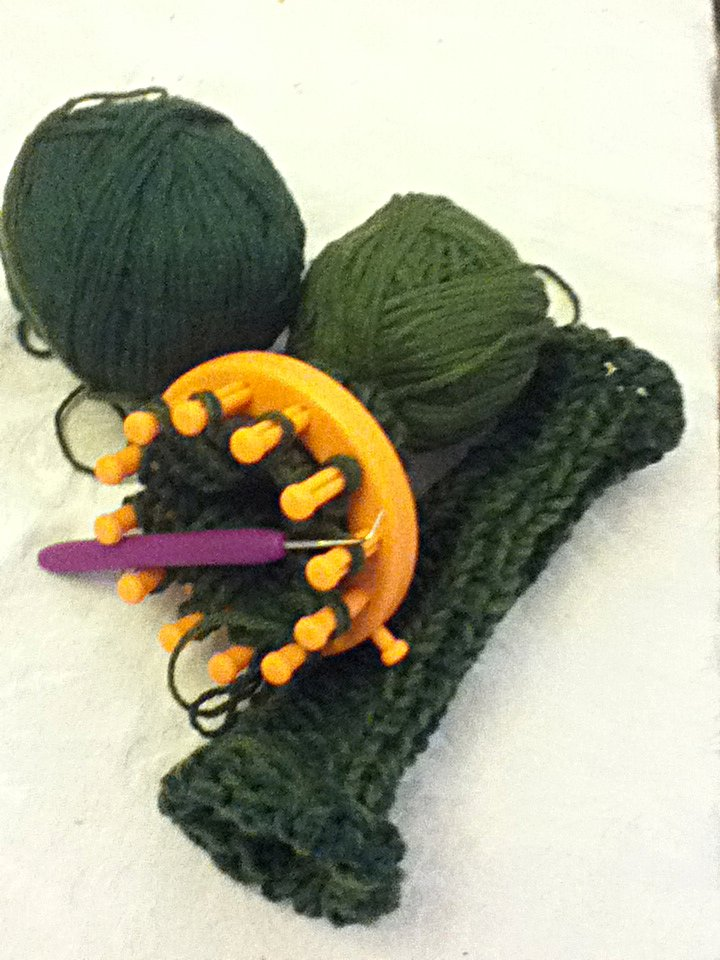
Fingerless gloves being knitted on a plastic 12-peg frame

Spool knitting, loom knitting, corking, French knitting, or tomboy knitting is a form of knitting that uses a spool with a number of nails or pegs around the rim to produce a tube or sheet of fabric. The spool knitting devices are called knitting spools, knitting nancys, knitting frame, knitting loom, or French knitters.

The technique is to wrap the yarn around all of the spool's pegs, twice. The lower loop of yarn is then lifted over the upper loop and off the peg, thereby creating stitches. The yarn is then wrapped around the entire loom, creating a new upper yarn on each peg. This process is repeated until the project is complete.

Spool knitting frames typically have four or five pegs (or brass nails), although the number can range to more than 100. Though not exclusively, the term "loom knitting" often refers to frames with more than those four or five pegs.

== Uses ==
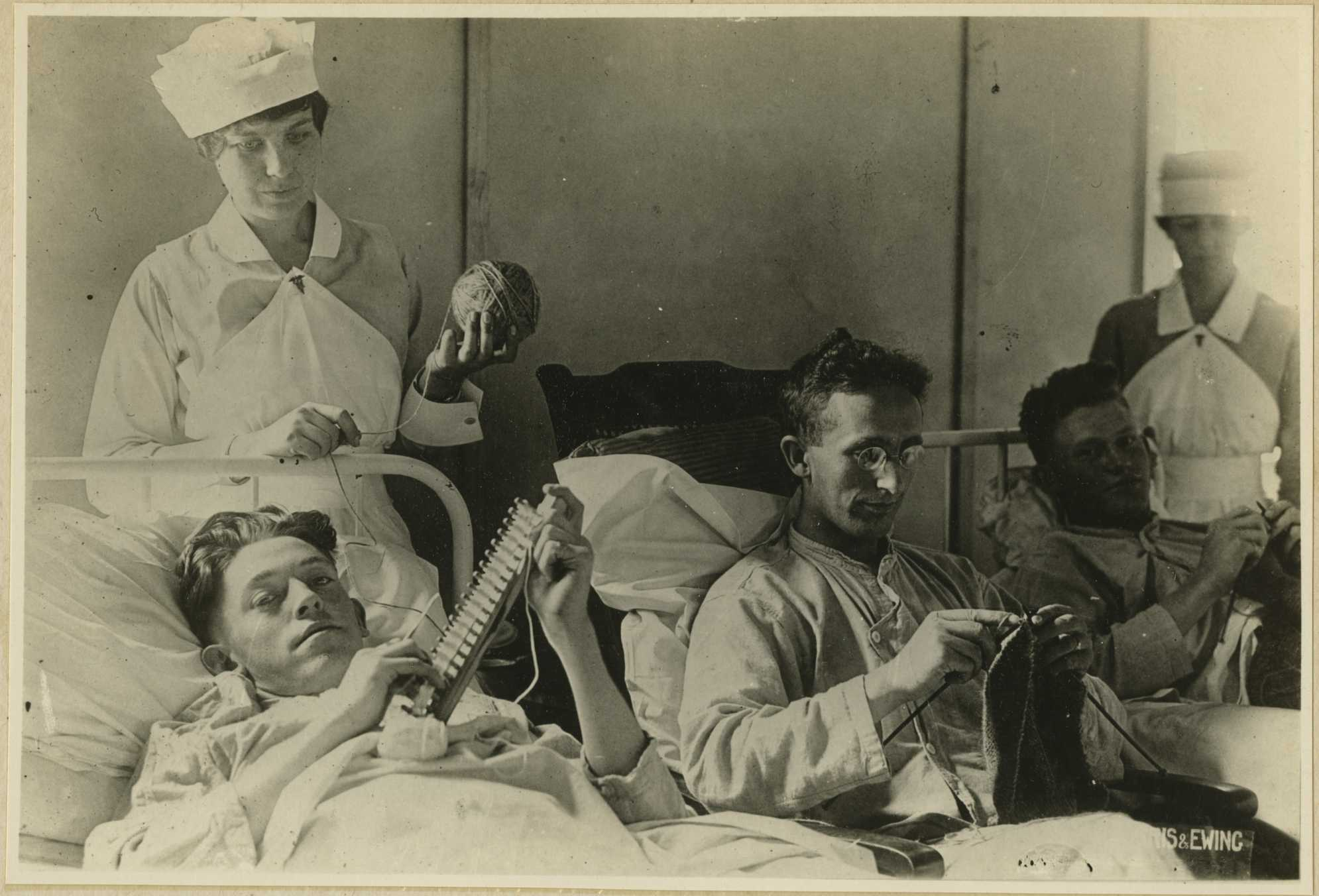
As occupational therapy for the wounded of World War I

Many things can be made from the resulting tube. For example, it can be wound in a spiral to produce a mat or rug or, if a larger spool with more nails is used, a sock or a hat could be made. Historically, spool knitting has been used to make horse reins.

Spool knitting is a traditional way to teach children the basic principles of knitting. According to Mary McCormack, author of Spool Knitting (published in 1909), "Few elementary exercises have aroused more interest in the child than the toy knitting; due, perhaps, to its simplicity and his power to do it easily and well."

== History ==
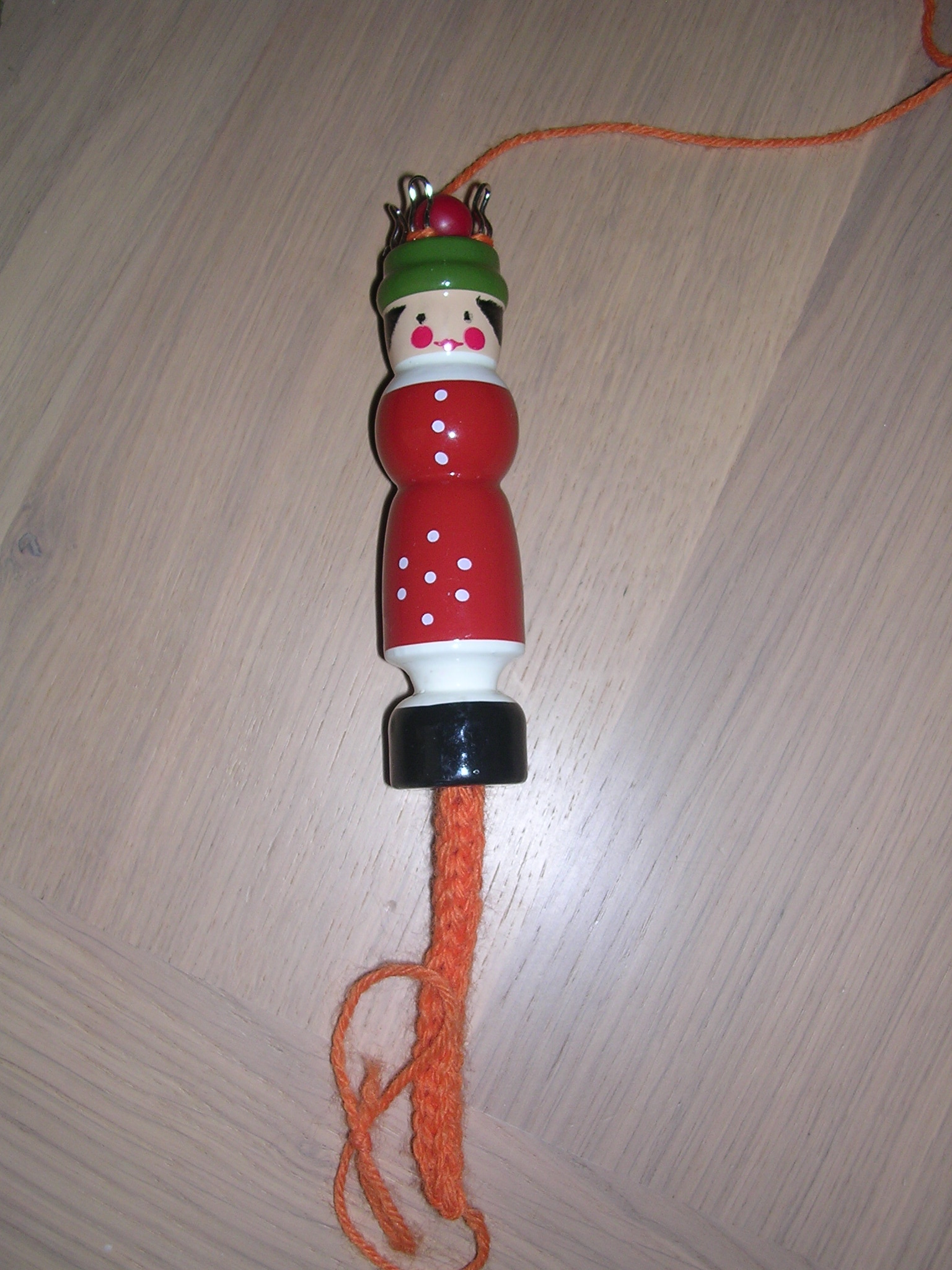
A wooden knitting nancy

Knitting spools are the oldest members of the knitting loom family, with a history dating back over 400 years. The earliest recorded reference to the use of a frame for knitting is in 1535 in Strasbourg in a legal decision about the proper guild for sock knitters. It has been speculated by some 3D printing hobbyists that the so-called Roman dodecahedra might have been used as glove knitting devices, dating to c. 1st–5th century CE. Lucets are essentially two-prong knitting frames.

Spools sold as "knitting nancys" sometimes had a figure painted or printed on them, thus resembling a wooden doll. Homemade knitting spools are sometimes made by placing a peg-like object, such as a nail, into a hard solid object, such as a block of wood (or a traditional wooden spool).

Beginning in the latter half of the 20th century, various small looms (usually plastic) using the same peg-knitting technique as knitting spools have been made. Some are larger than knitting spools, and can knit larger items. Some are straight, and make flat items such as blankets or scarfs, and some are round for making socks, hats, or other similar items. If the thread is not wrapped around in a helix, but back-and-forth, leaving two pegs with a space between that no yarn crosses, a flat sheet can be made on a round frame.

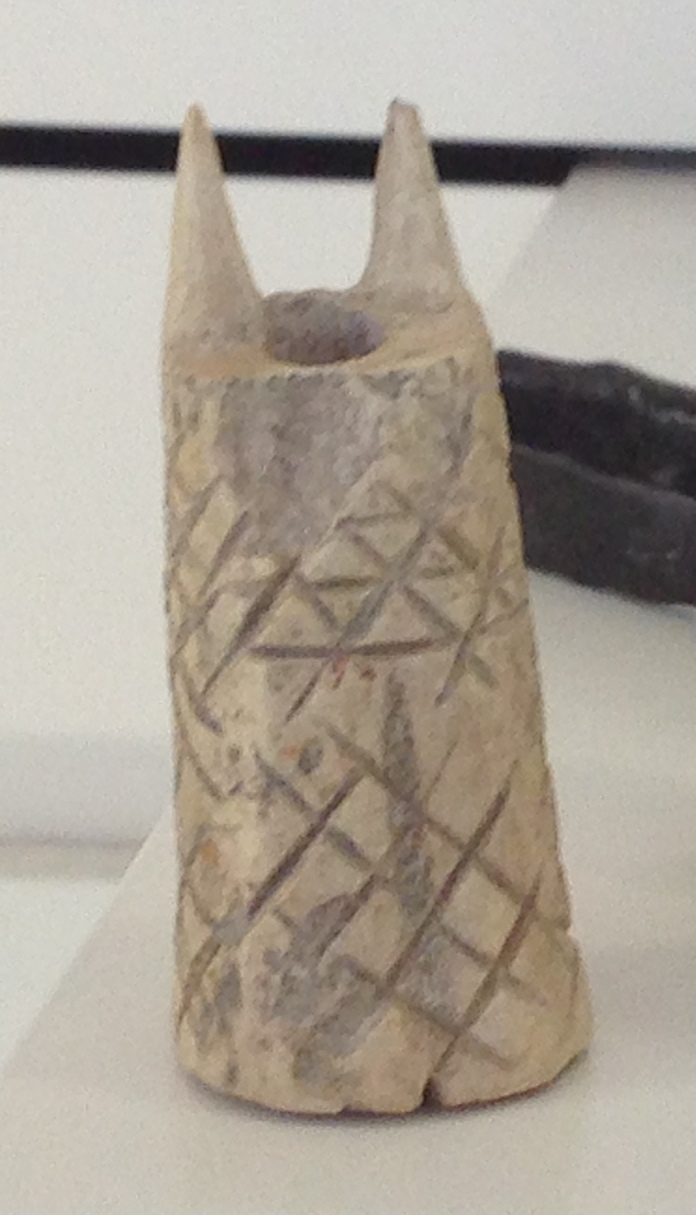
10th-century lucet spool from northern France.

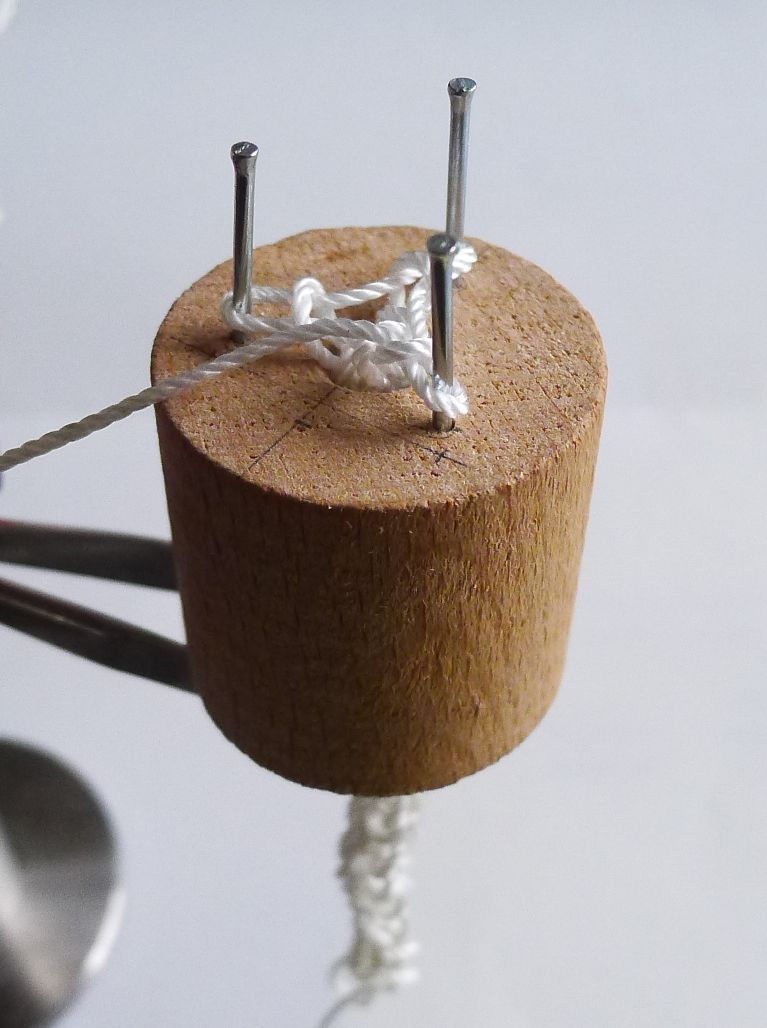
Minimal spool knitting frame

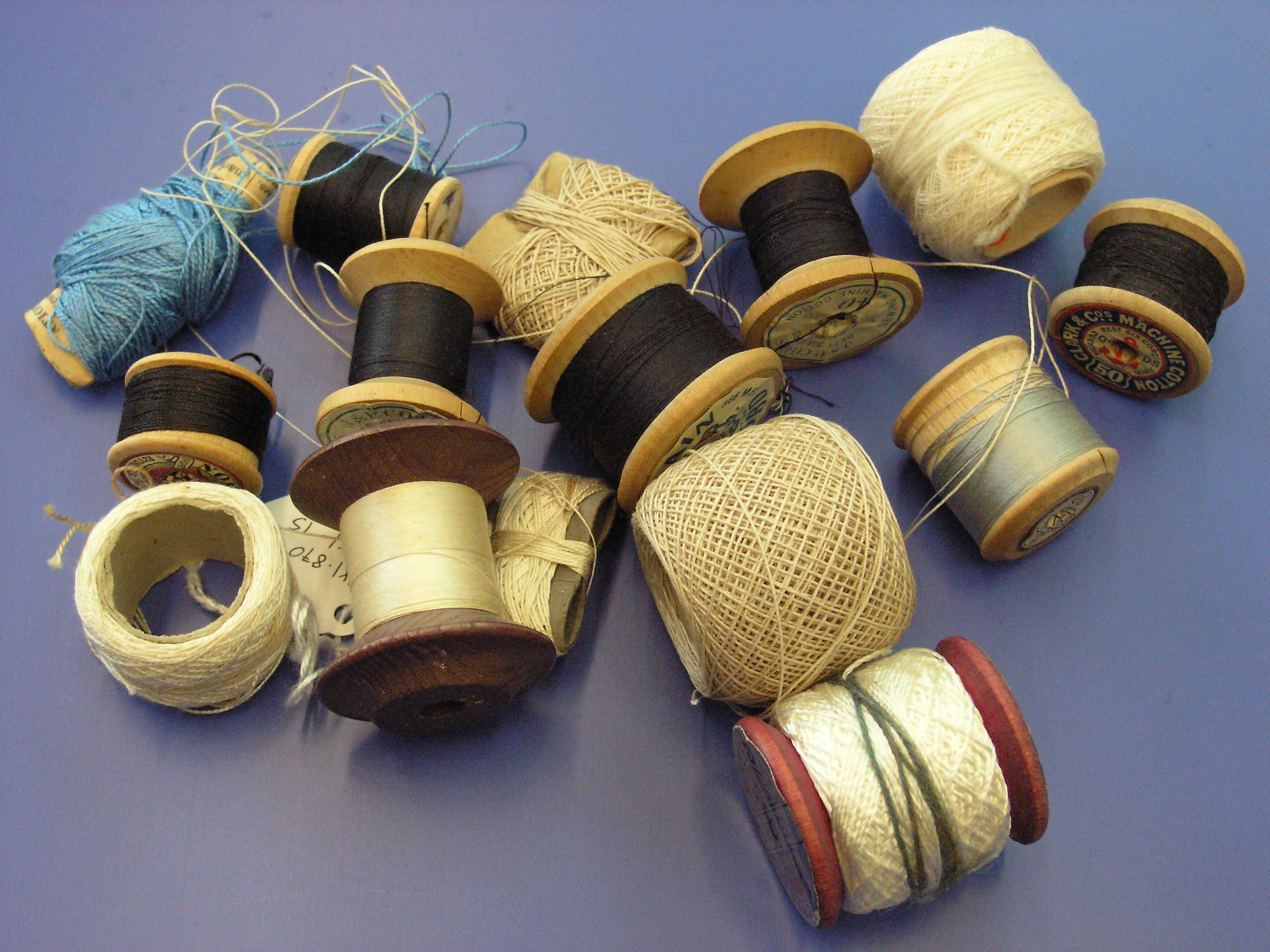
Traditional wooden spools of the sort used to hold thread, with a few nails driven into one end, make knitting spools.

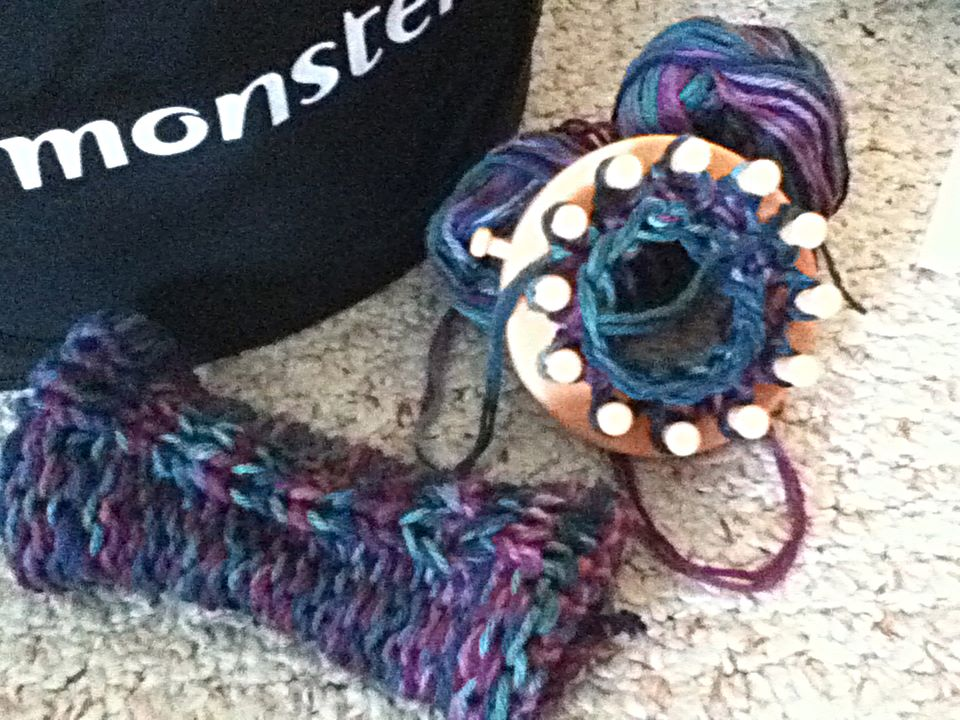
A plastic 12-peg frame

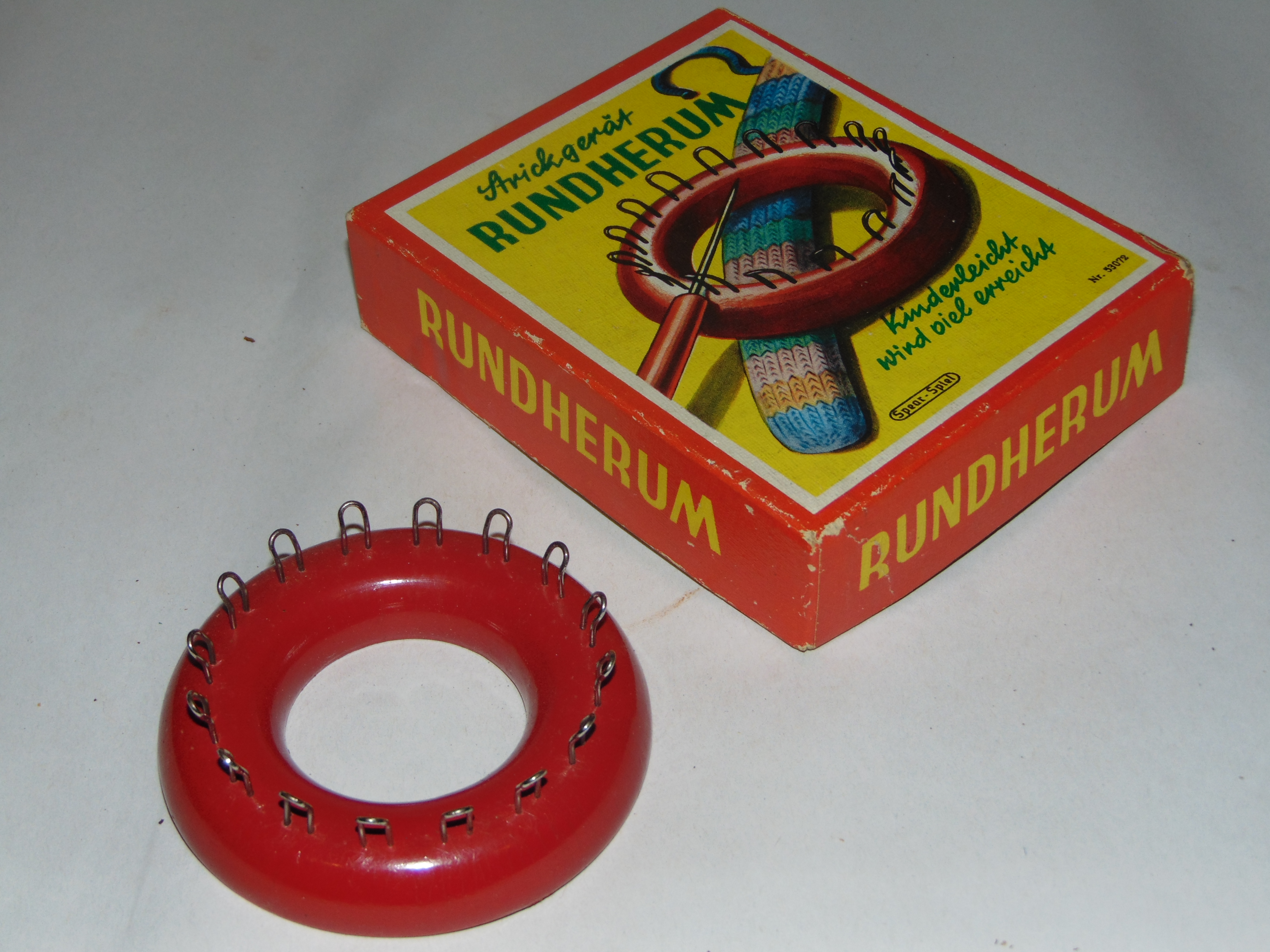
Spool knitting circle with 16 pegs

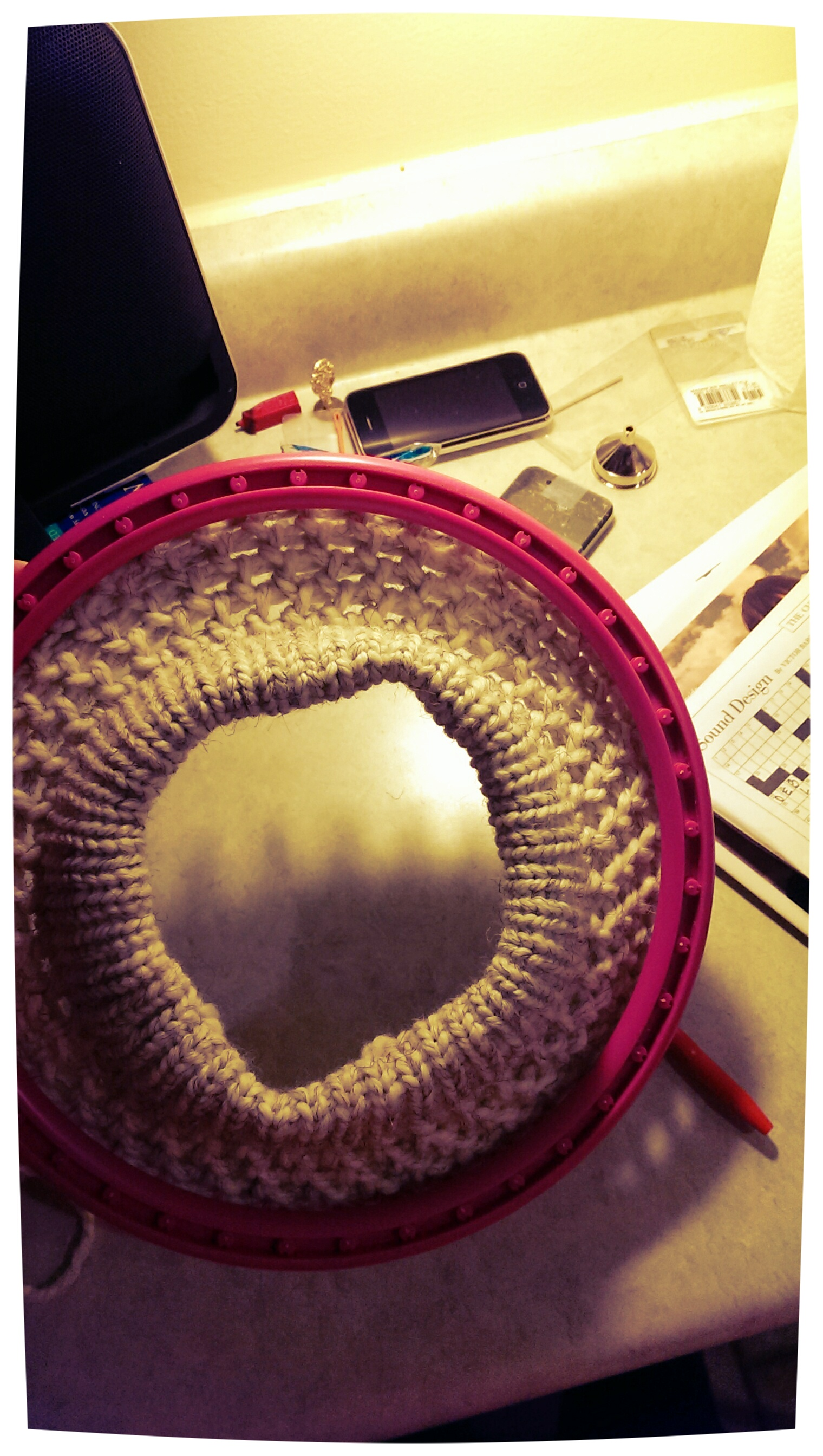
Knitting a tuque (hat) on a larger frame

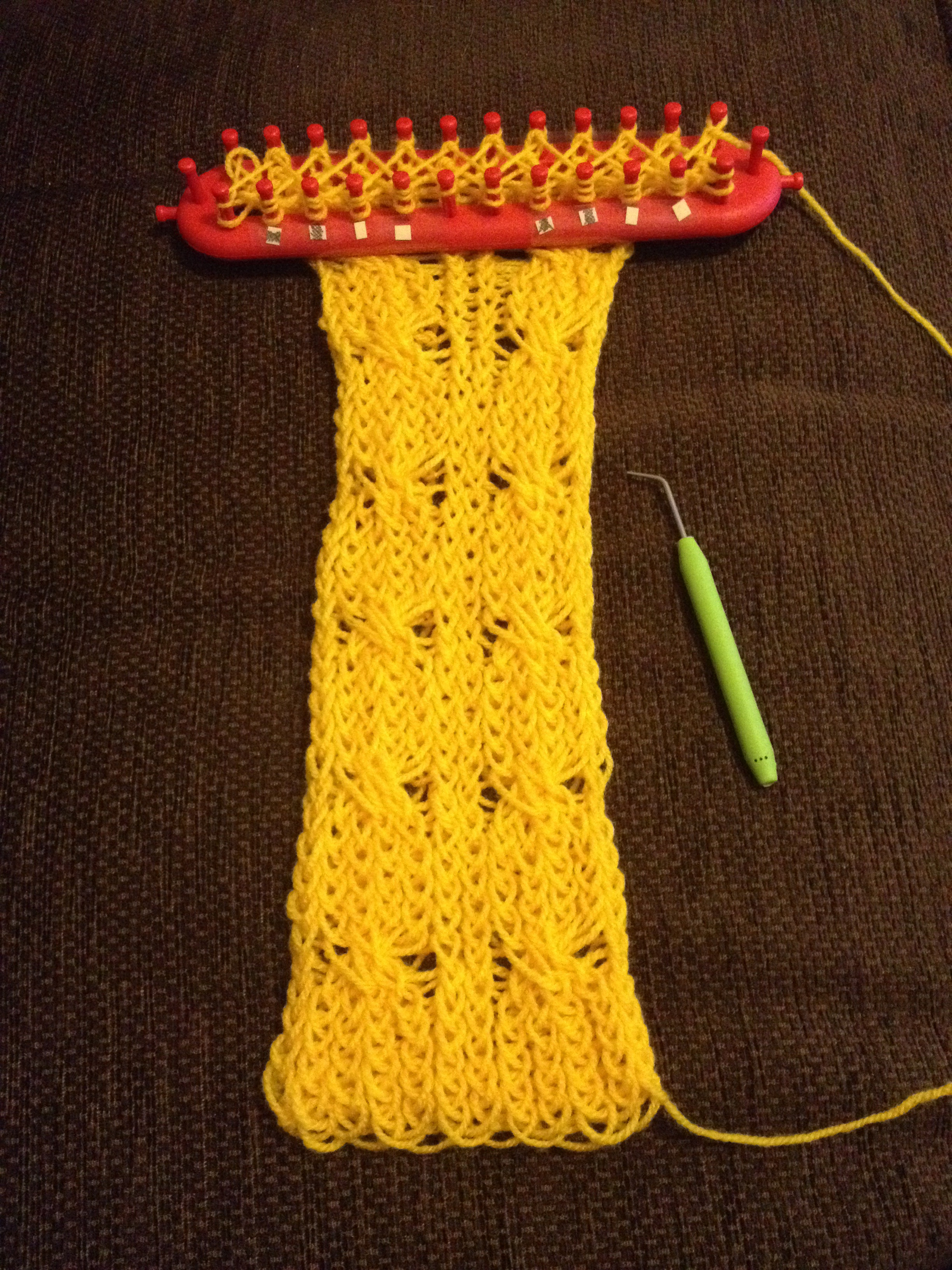
Oblong frame for circular knitting; note central slot between the two rows of pegs

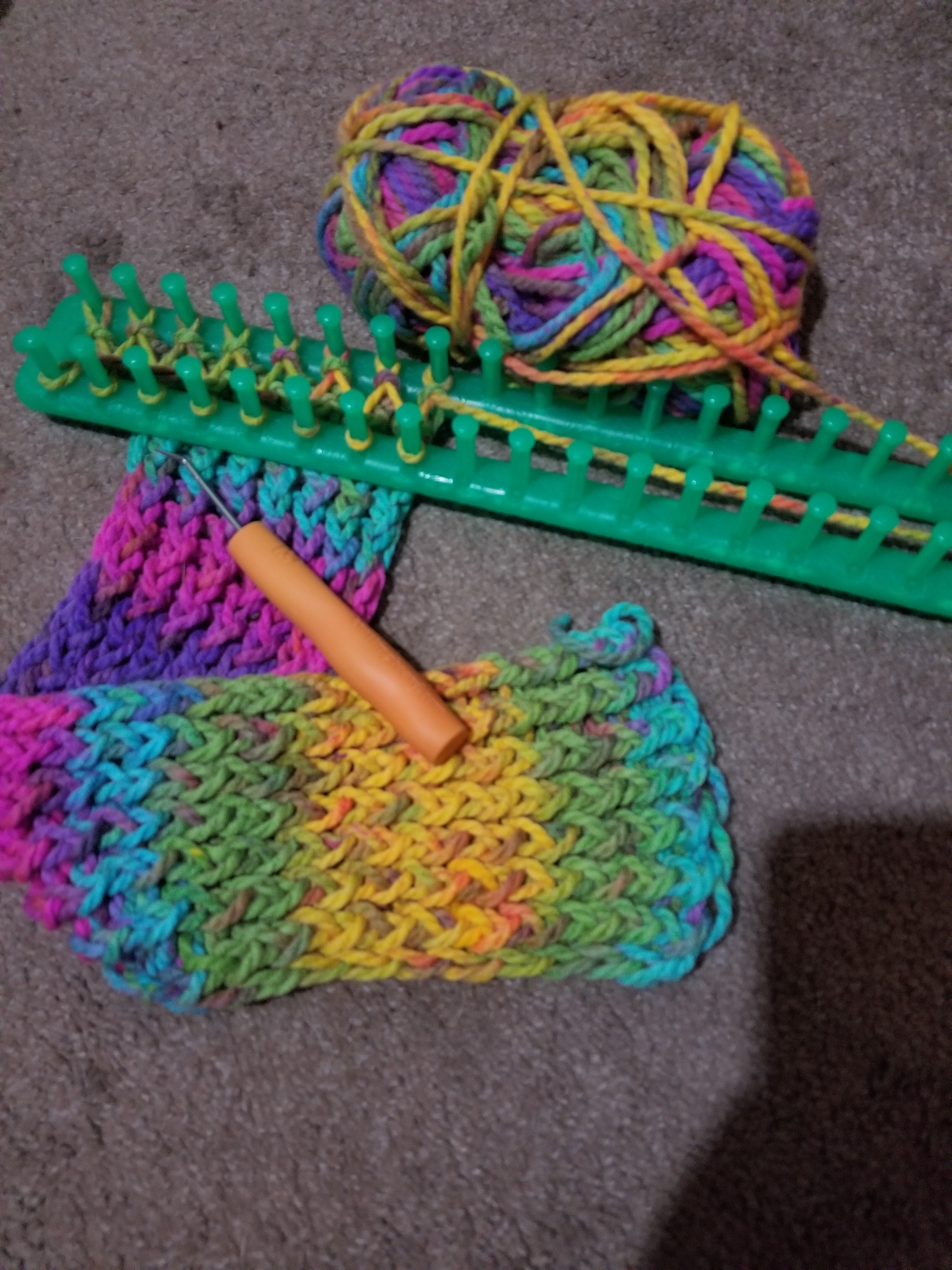
It is not necessary to use the full length of an oblong frame

== Cranked versions ==
Simple versions contain just peg-like structures sticking up from a solid object. More complex ones operate complex mechanisms and automatically produce a knitted item with just a simple motion, such as a turn of a crank. See spool and machine circular knitting for more on these machines.

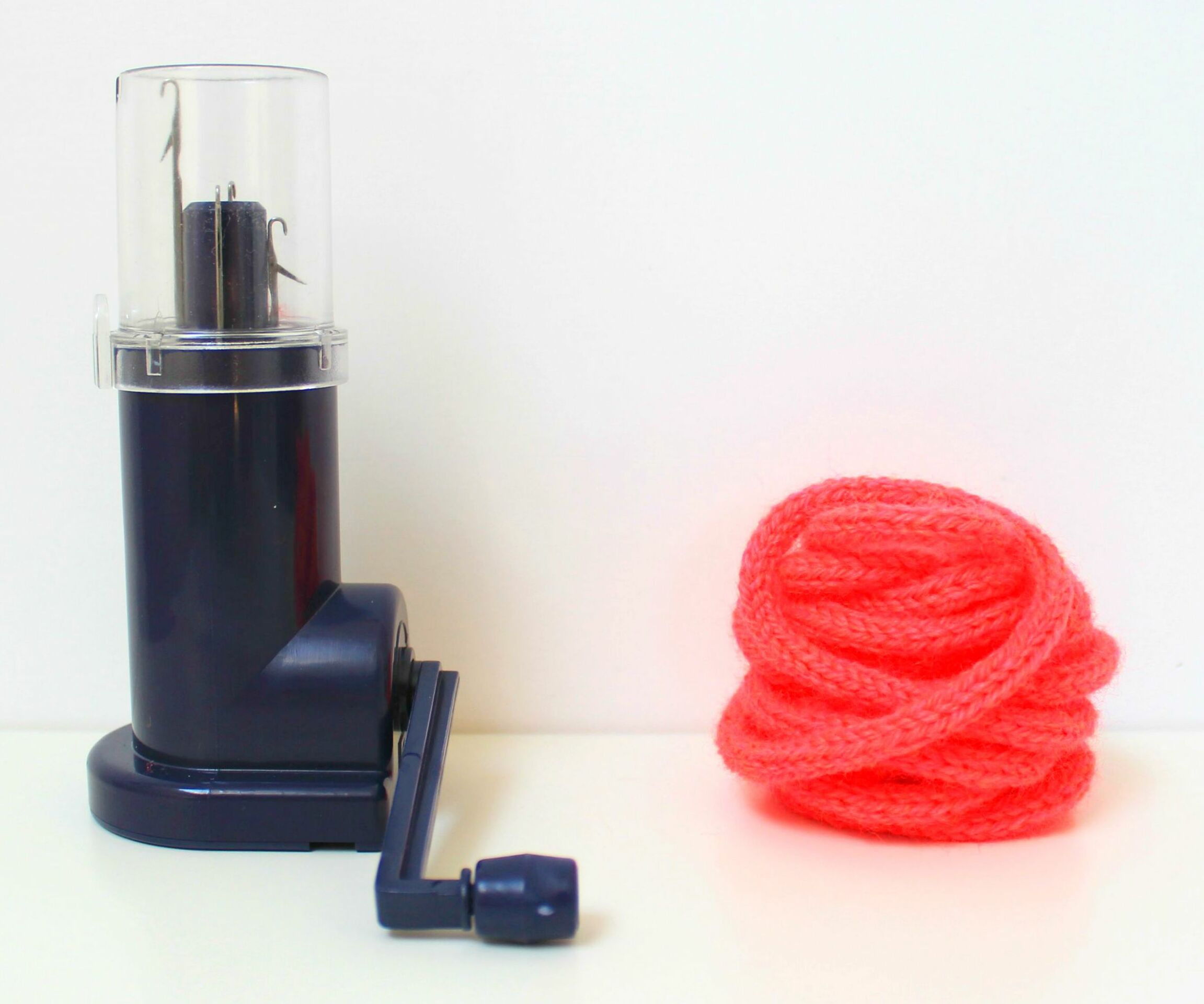
Narrow hand-cranked spool knitting machine

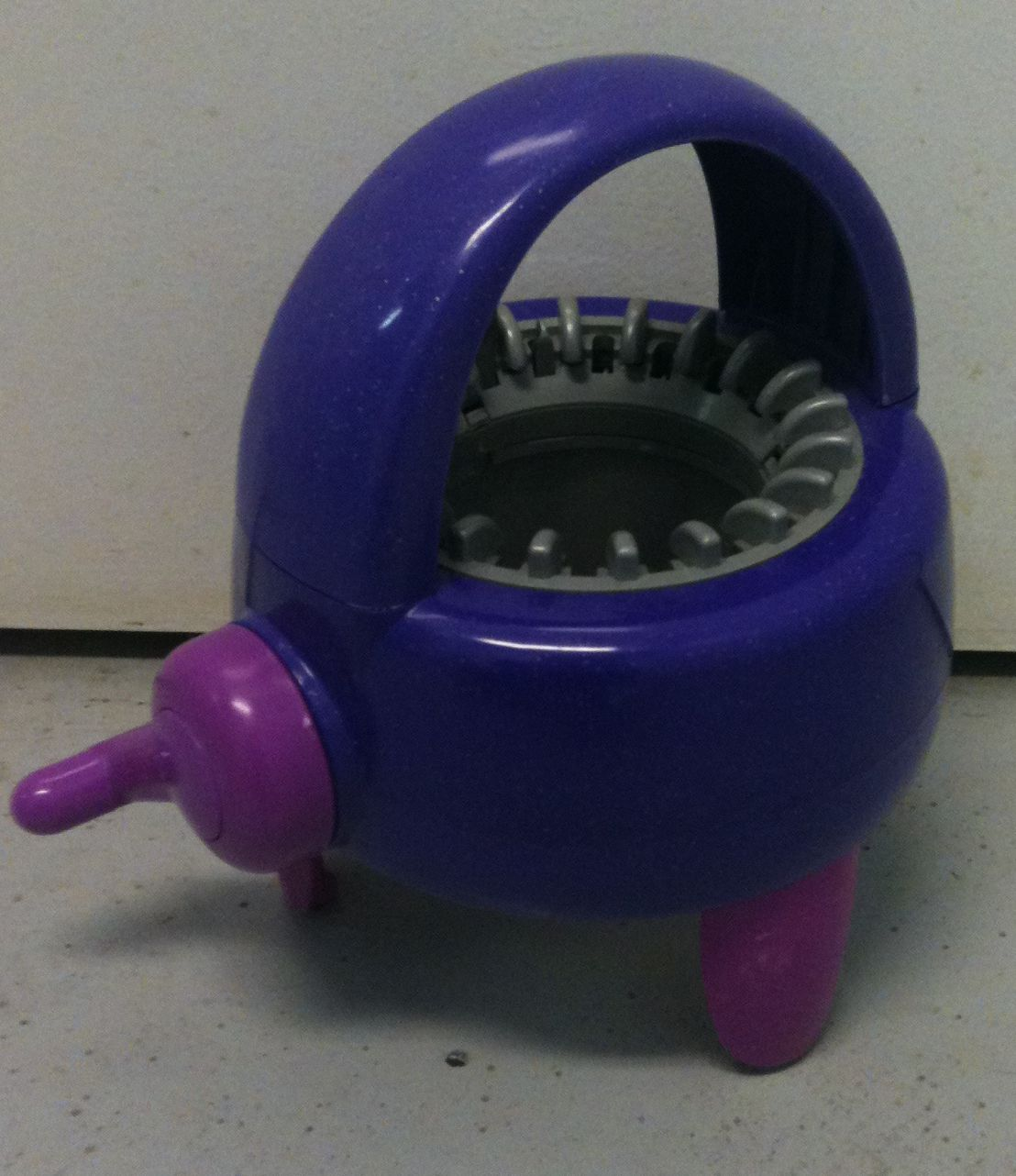
Larger hand-cranked circular knitting machine

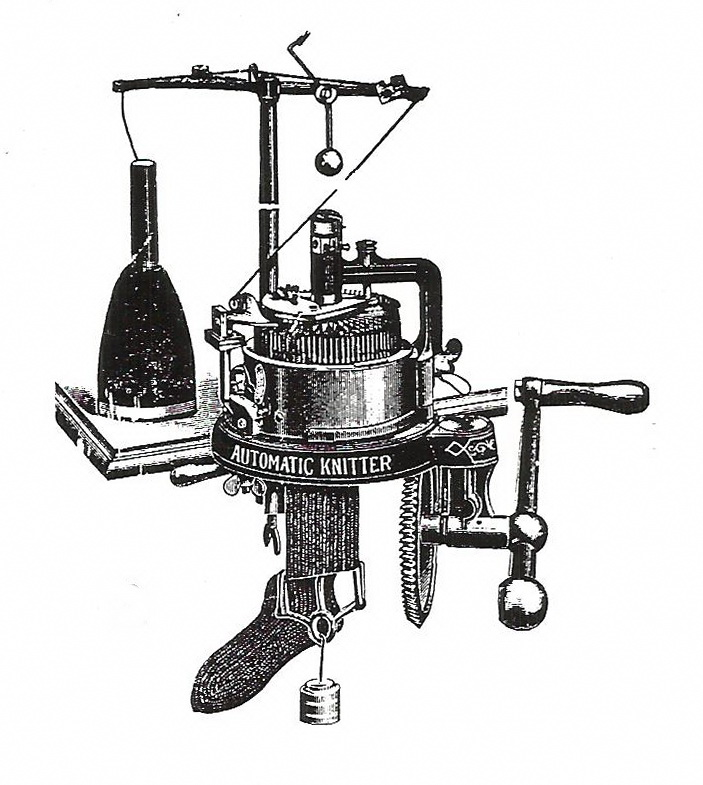
1800s knitting machine, also hand-cranked

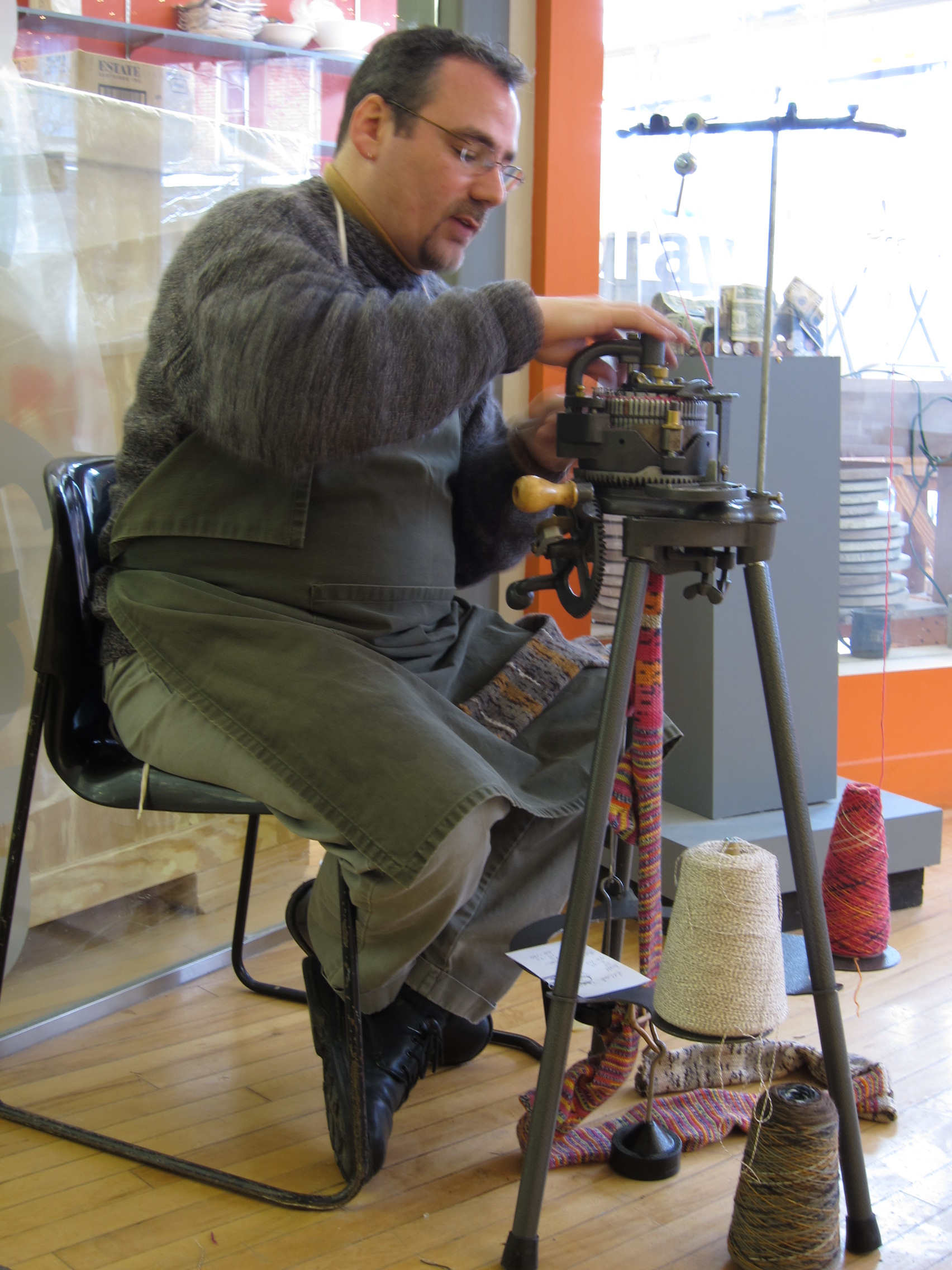
A similar old sock-knitting machine in use

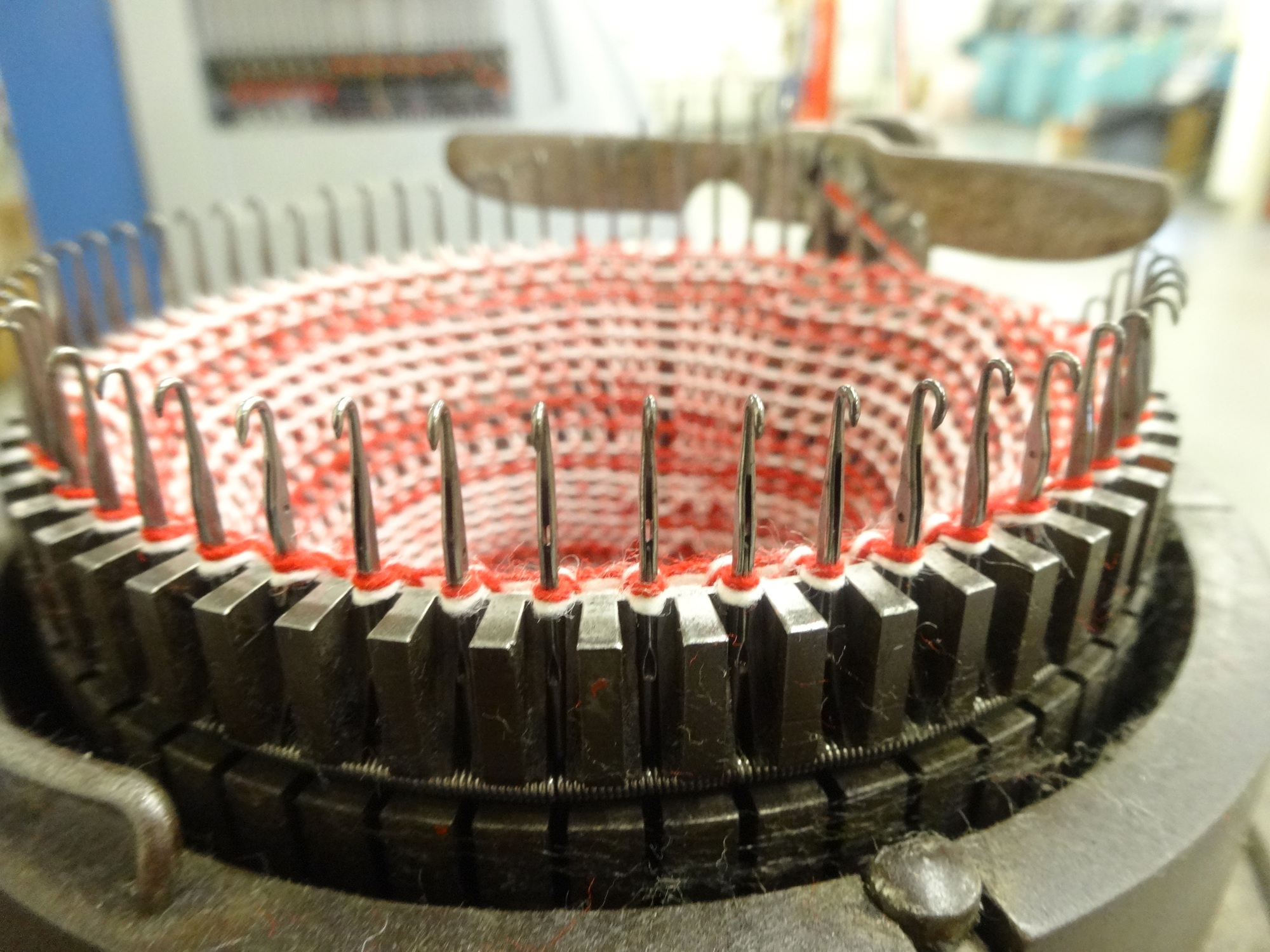
Close-up of a similar machine. Note how hooks rise and fall.

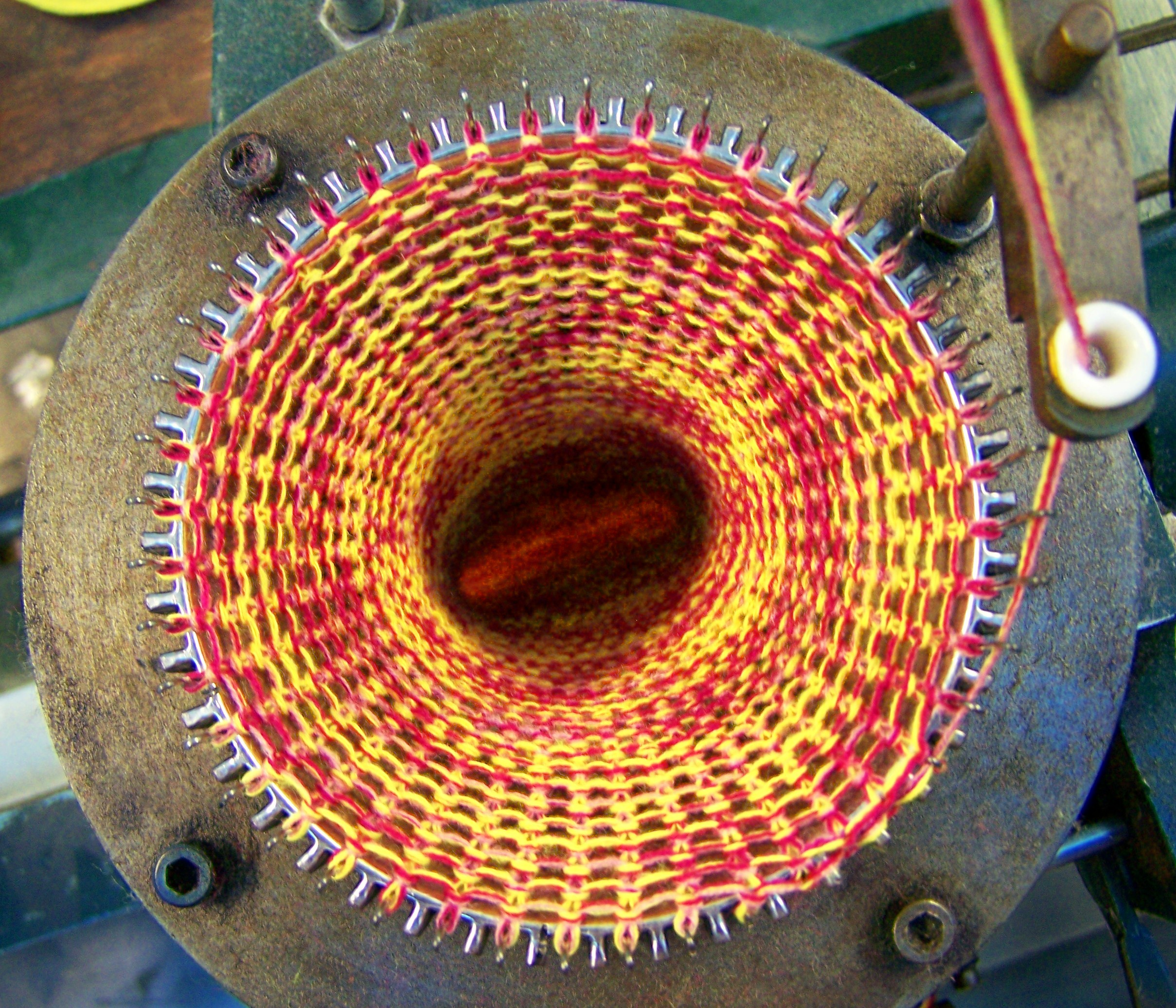
1959 power knitting machine

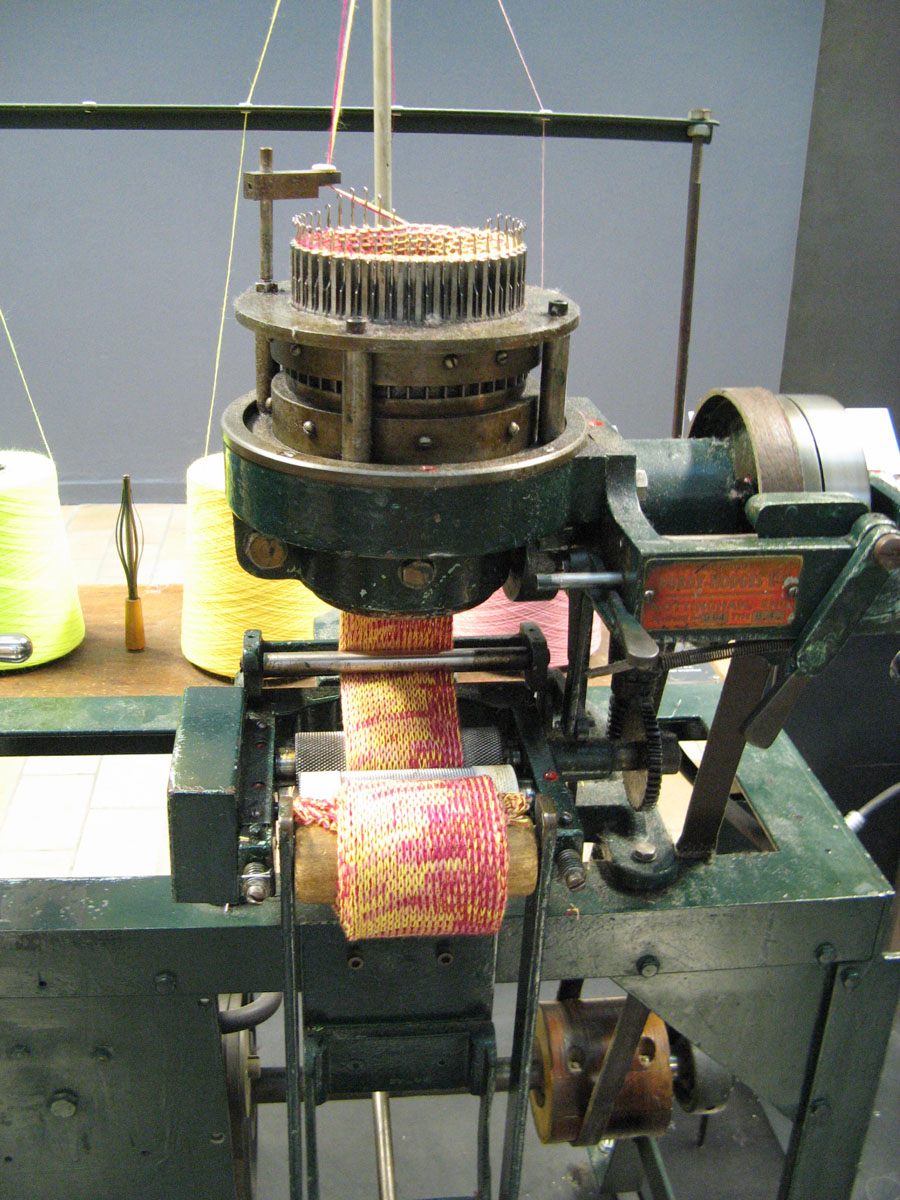
Side view of 1959 machine

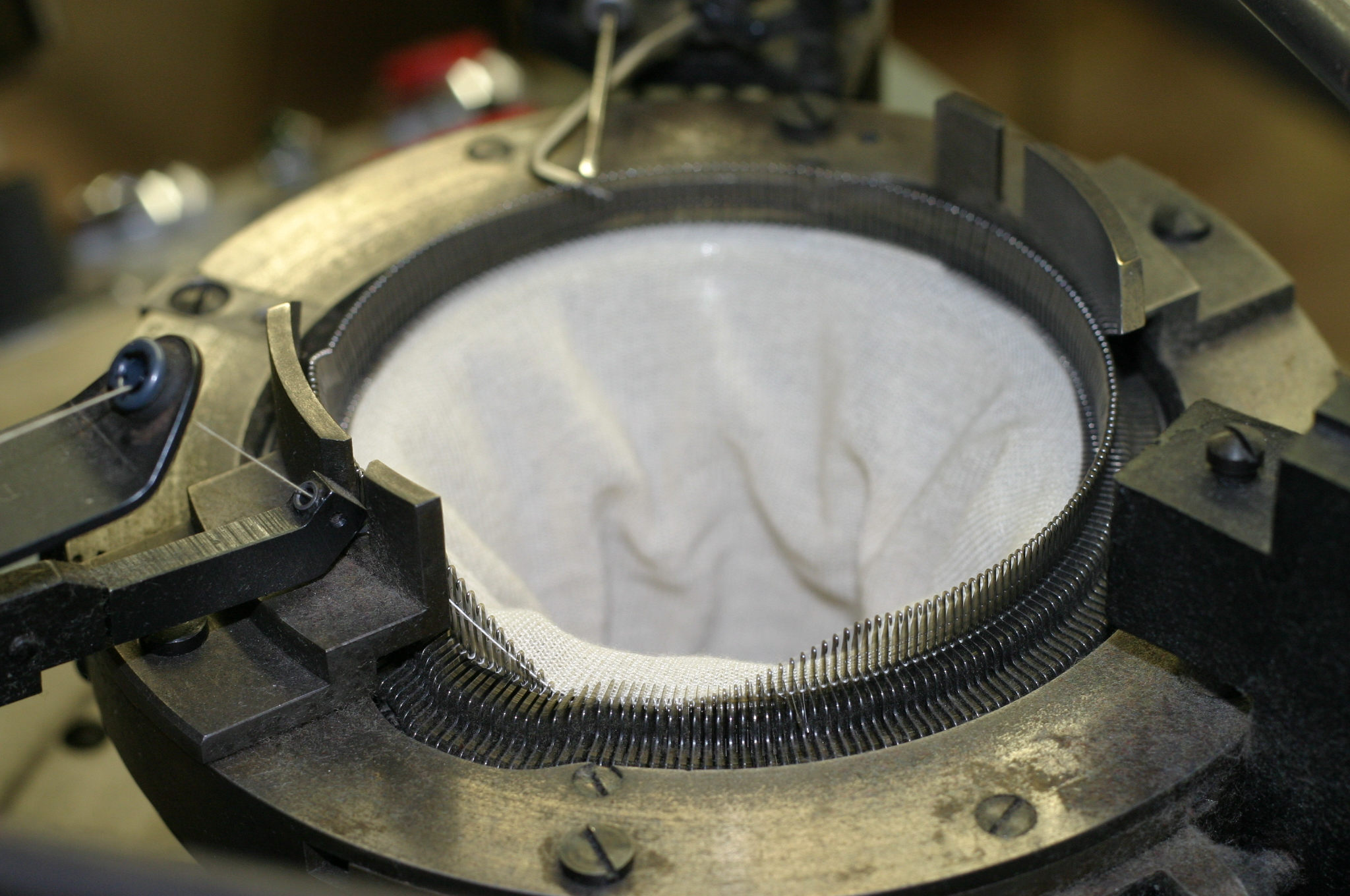
Machine for fine knitting

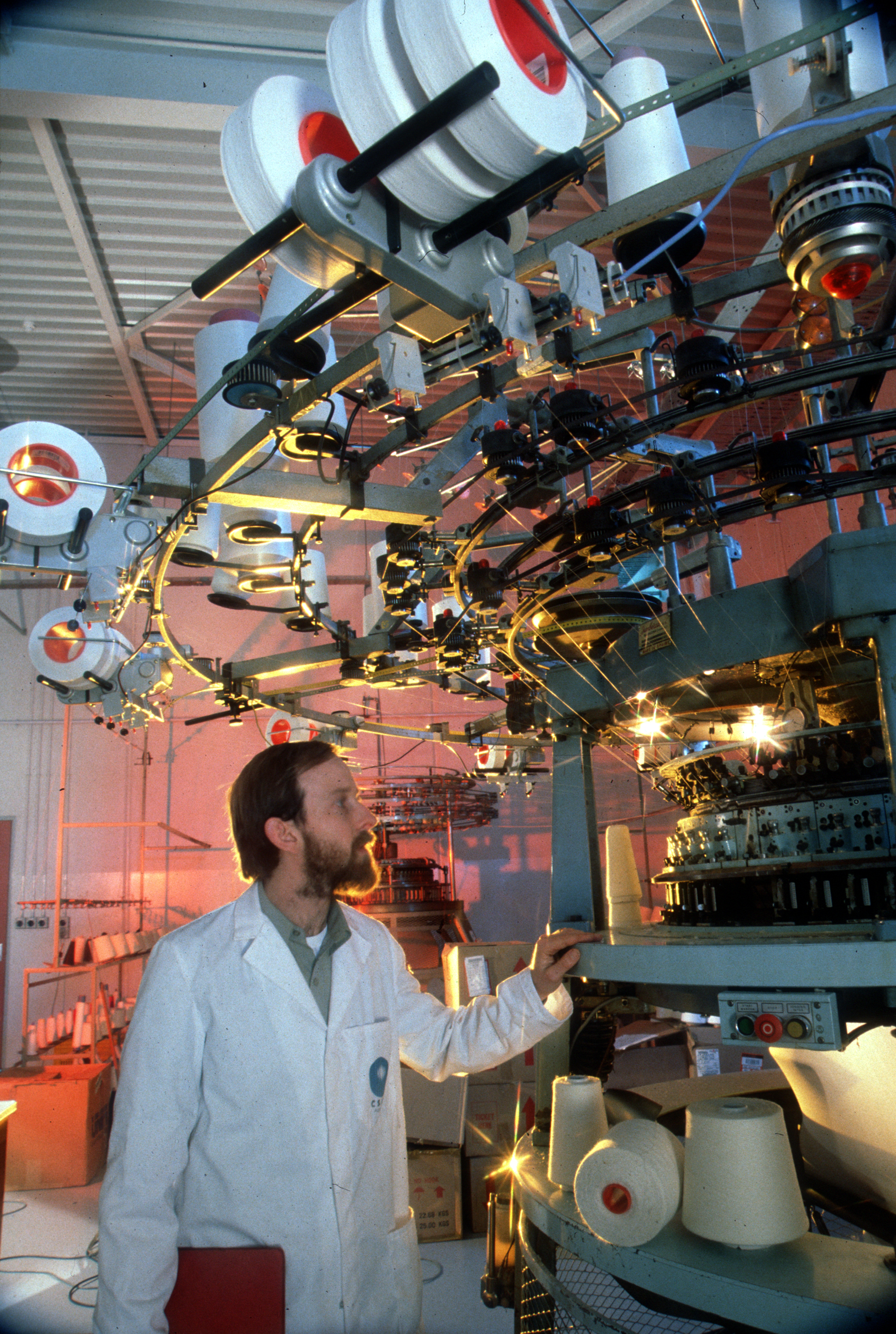
A commercial machine knitting wool, 2000

== See also ==
- I-cord is a similar, but not identical, knitting technique, done in knitting needles.
