= Kinky hair =

Human hair texture

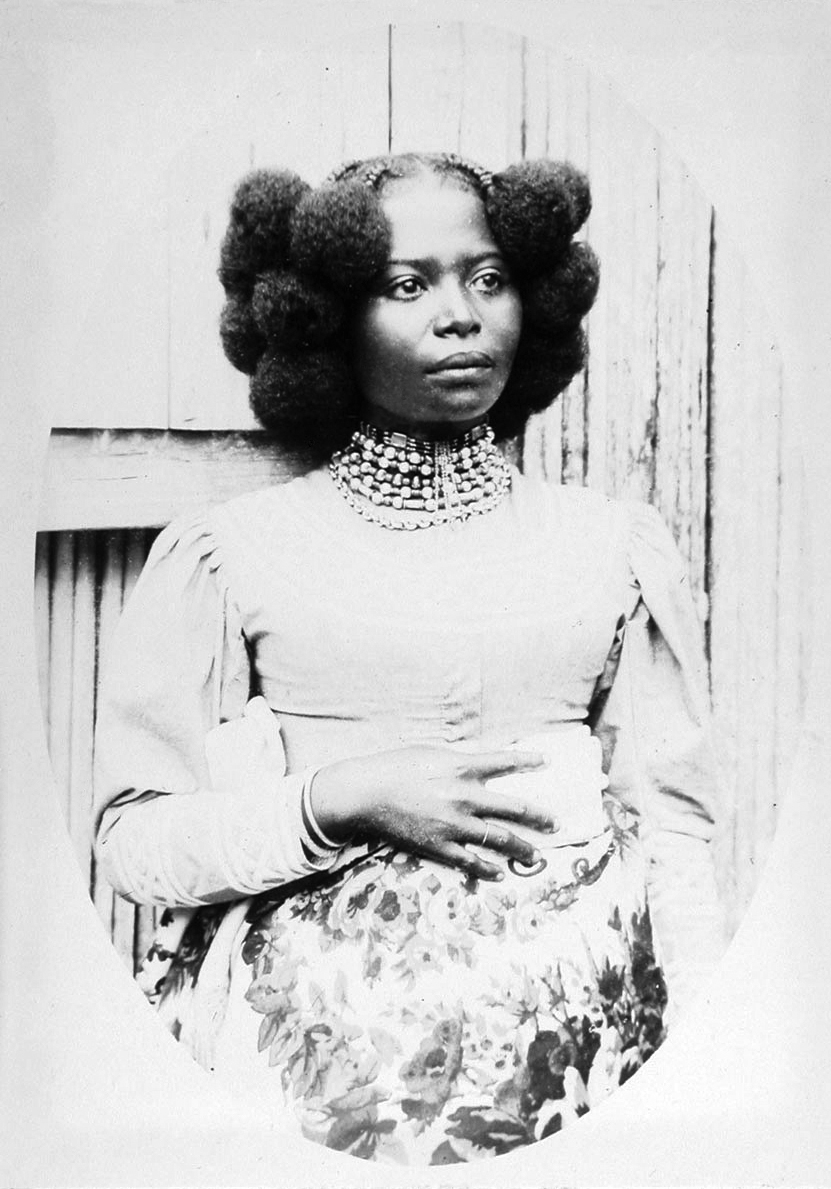
Woman from the island of Nosy Be, in Madagascar, c. 1868

Kinky hair (also known as coily hair, afro-textured hair, tightly coiled hair, afro-hair or natural afro-hair) is a human hair texture prevalent in the Indigenous peoples of Sub-Saharan Africa, Melanesia, Micronesia, Torres Strait Islands, and Tasmania, along with the Negrito populations of Southeast Asia and the Andaman Islands. Each strand of this hair type grows in a repeating pattern of small contiguous kinks which can be classified as tight twists and sharp folds. These numerous kinks make kinky hair appear denser than straight, wavy, and curly hair types.

== Terminology ==
English adjectives such as woolly, kinky, or spiraled have been used in the mid-20th century to describe natural afro-textured hair. More formally, ulotrichous ('curly-haired' from Ancient Greek: οὖλος, romanized: oûlos, lit. 'crisp, curly' and Ancient Greek: θρίξ, romanized: thríx, lit. 'hair') refers to afro-textured hair, its antonym being leiotrichous ('smooth-haired'). Jean Baptiste Bory de Saint-Vincent in 1825 introduced the scientific term Oulotrichi for the purpose of human taxonomy.

In 1997, hairstylist Andre Walker created a numerical grading system for human hair types. The Andre Walker Hair Typing System classifies kinky hair as 'type 4' (there are other types of hair, defined as type 1 for straight hair, type 2 for wavy, and type 3 for curly, with the letters A, B, and C used as indicators of the degree of coil variation in each type), with the subcategory of type 4C being most exemplary of the kinky hair. However, kinky hair is often difficult to categorize because of the many different variations among individuals. Those variations include pattern (mainly tight coils), pattern size (watch-spring to chalk), density (sparse to dense), strand diameter (fine, medium, coarse), and feel (cottony, woolly, spongy). This leads to variants of kinky hair, like the pepper corn hair found in Khoisan and Pygmy people, and combable thick spirally hair most common in southern and central Africans, which grows exponentially faster than the norm known by dermatologists. The 4A, 4B and 4C scale only includes Afroeurasian hair with varying degree of curl patterns.

Different genetic groups have observable differences in the structure, density, and growth rate of hair. With regard to structure, all human hair has the same basic chemical composition in terms of keratin protein content. Franbourg et al. have found that black hair may differ in the distribution of lipids throughout the hair shaft. Classical kinky hair has been found to be not as densely concentrated on the scalp as other follicle types. Specifically, the average density of kinky hair was found to be approximately 190 hairs per square centimeter. This was significantly lower than that of European hair, which, on average, has approximately 227 hairs per square centimeter.

Geneviève Loussouarn found that kinky hair grows at an average rate of approximately 256 micrometers per day, whereas European-textured straight hair grows at approximately 396 micrometers per day. In addition, due to a phenomenon called 'shrinkage', kinky hair that is a given length when stretched straight can appear much shorter when allowed to naturally coil. Shrinkage is most evident when kinky hair is (or has recently been) wet. The more coiled the hair texture, the higher its shrinkage.

The shape of the hair follicle determines the hair's curliness. An individual hair's shape is never completely circular. The cross-section of a hair is an ellipse, which can tend towards a circle or be distinctly flattened. Straight hair, like those of East Asians, is formed from almost-round hair follicles while wavy hair, as found in Europe, is formed by oval shaped follicles. Kinky hair has a flattened cross-section which is finer and its ringlets can form tight circles with diameters of only a few millimeters. In humans worldwide, East Asian-textured hair is the most common, whereas kinky hair is the least common. This is because the former hair texture is typical of the large populations inhabiting the Far East as well as the indigenous peoples of the Americas.

== Evolution ==
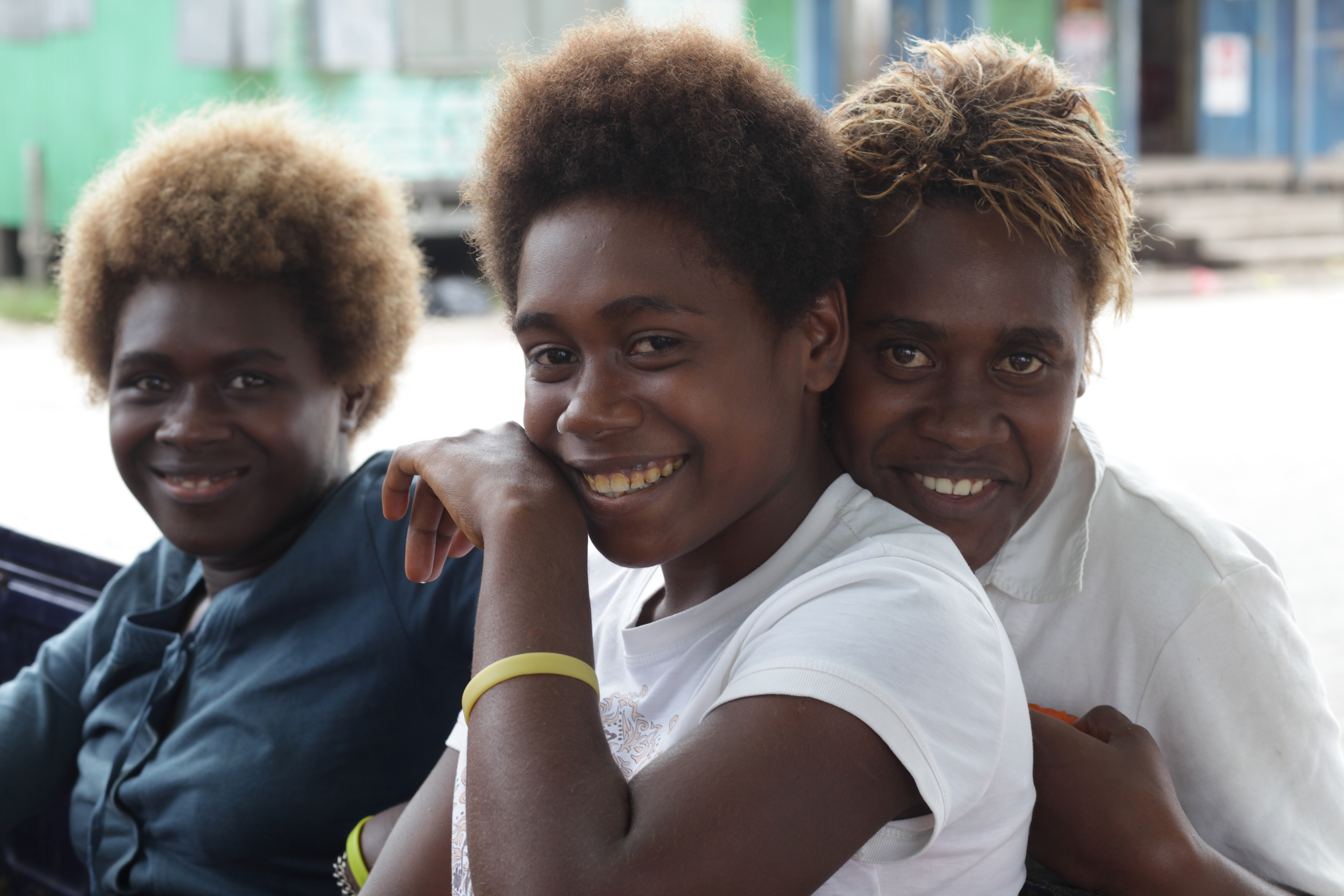
Papua New Guinean women with kinky hair

Kinky hair is a uniquely human characteristic, as most mammals have straight hair, including the earliest hominids.

Clarence R. Robbins has suggested that kinky hair may have initially evolved because of an adaptive need amongst humans' early hominid ancestors for protection against the intense UV radiation of the sun in Africa. According to Robbins, kinky hair may have been adaptive for the earliest modern humans in Africa because the relatively sparse density of such hair, combined with its elastic helix shape, results in an airy effect. The resulting increased circulation of cool air onto the scalp may have thus served to facilitate the body-temperature-regulation system of hominids while they lived on the open savannah.

Kinky hair requires more moisture than straight hair and tends to shrink when dry. Instead of sticking to the neck and scalp when damp (as do straighter textures), it tends to retain its basic springiness, unless completely drenched. The trait may have been retained and/or preferred among many anatomically modern populations in equatorial areas, such as Micronesians, Melanesians (including Torres Strait Islanders), and the Negrito, because of its contribution to enhanced comfort levels under tropical climate conditions.

In rare cases, kinky hair may also be found in populations living under temperate climate conditions, such as Aboriginal Tasmanians.

== History ==
Historically, many cultures in Sub-Saharan Africa – in common with cultures worldwide – developed hairstyles that defined status, or identity, in regards to age, ethnicity, wealth, social rank, marital status, religion, fertility, adulthood, and death. Hair was carefully groomed, as the social implications of hair grooming were a significant part of community life. Dense, thick, clean, and neatly groomed hair was something highly admired and sought after. Hair groomers possessed unique styling skills, allowing them to create a variety of designs that met the local cultural standards.

In many traditional cultures, communal grooming was a social event when women socialized and strengthened bonds with their families. Historically, hair braiding was not a paid trade. When men from the Wolof tribe (in modern Senegal and The Gambia) went to war they wore a braided style. A woman in mourning would either not "do" her hair or adopt a subdued style. Since the creation of the African diaspora and during the 20th and 21st centuries, it has developed into a global industry in regions such as the United States and South Africa, as well as among sub-Saharan African migrants to Western Europe; the global black hair care market is estimated at $1.6 billion dollars USD. An individual's hair groomer was usually someone whom they knew closely. Sessions can include shampooing, oiling, combing, braiding, and twisting, plus adding accessories.

For shampooing, black soap was widely used in nations in West and Central Africa. Additionally, palm oil and palm kernel oil were popularly used for oiling the scalp. Shea butter has traditionally been used to moisturize and dress the hair.

=== United States ===
==== Trans-Atlantic slave trade ====
Diasporic Africans in the Americas have experimented with ways to style their hair since their arrival in the Western Hemisphere well before the 19th century. During the approximately 400 years of the Trans-Atlantic slave trade, which extracted over 20 million people from West and Central Africa, their beauty ideals have undergone numerous changes.

Africans captured as slaves no longer had the sort of resources to practice hair grooming that they had had when home. The enslaved Africans adapted as best they could under the circumstances, finding sheep-fleece carding tools particularly useful for detangling their hair. They suffered from scalp diseases and infestations due to their living conditions. Enslaved people used varying remedies for disinfecting and cleansing their scalps, such as applying kerosene or cornmeal directly on the scalp with a cloth as they carefully parted the hair. Enslaved field hands often shaved their hair and wore hats to protect their scalps against the sun. House slaves had to appear tidy and well-groomed. The men sometimes wore wigs mimicking their "masters"', or similar hairstyles, while the women typically plaited or braided their hair. During the 19th century, hair styling, especially among women, became more popular. Cooking grease such as lard, butter and goose grease, were used to moisturize the hair. Women sometimes used hot butter knives to curl their hair.

Because of the then-prevalent notion that straight wavy or curly hair (which, unlike kinky hair, is common in people of European origin) was more acceptable than kinky hair, many black people began exploring solutions for straightening, or relaxing, their tresses. One post-slavery method was a mixture of lye, egg and potato, which burned the scalp upon contact.

==== Politics of kinky hair in the West ====
Wearing kinky hair in its natural state today represents embracing one's natural self, and for some it is a simple matter of style or preference. In the United States during the 1960s, kinky hair was transformed into a revolutionary political statement that became synonymous with Black Pride & Beauty, and by default a fundamental tool in the Black Power Movement; "[h]air came to symbolize either a continued move toward integration in the American political system or a growing cry for Black power and nationalism." Prior to this, the idealized Black person (especially Black women) "had many Eurocentric features, including hairstyles." However, during the movement, the Black community endeavoured to define their own ideals and beauty standards, and hair became a central icon which was "promoted as a way of challenging mainstream standards regarding hair". During this time, kinky hair "was at its height of politicization", and wearing an Afro was an easily distinguishable physical expression of Black pride and the rejection of societal norms. Jesse Jackson, a political activist, says that "the way [he] wore [his] hair was an expression of the rebellion of the time". Black activists infused straightened hair with political valence; straightening one's hair in an attempt to 'simulate Whiteness', whether chemically or with the use of heat, came to be seen by some as an act of self-hatred and a sign of internalized oppression imposed by White-dominated mainstream media.

At this time, an African-American person's "ability to conform to mainstream standards of beauty [was] tied to being successful." Thus, rejecting straightened hair symbolized a deeper act of rejecting the belief that straightening hair and other forms of grooming which were deemed 'socially acceptable' were the only means of looking presentable and attaining success in society. The pressing comb and chemical straighteners became stigmatized within the community as symbols of oppression and imposed White beauty ideals. Certain Black people sought to embrace beauty and affirm and accept their natural physical traits. One of the ultimate goals of the Black movement was to evolve to a level where Black people "were proud of black skin and kinky or nappy hair. As a result, natural hair became a symbol of that pride." Negative perceptions of kinky hair and beauty had been passed down through the generations, so they had become ingrained in Black mentality to the point where they had been accepted as simple truths. Wearing natural hair was seen as a progressive statement, and for all the support that the movement gathered, there were many who opposed natural hair both for its aesthetics and the ideology that it promoted. It caused tensions between the Black and White communities, as well as discomfort amongst more conservative African-Americans.

The style of kinky hair continues to be politicized in contemporary American society. "These issues of style are highly charged as sensitive questions about [an individual's] very 'identity'." Whether an individual decides to wear their hair in its natural state or alter it, all Black hairstyles convey a message. In several post-colonial societies, the value system promotes 'white bias', and "ethnicities are valorized according to the tilt of whiteness—[which] functions as the ideological basis for status ascription." In turn, in this value system, "African elements—be they cultural or physical—are devalued as indices of low social status, while European elements are positively valorized as attributes enabling individual upward mobility". This value system is reinforced by the systematic racism that was, and still is, often hidden from the public eye in Western society. Racism 'works' by encouraging the devaluation of self-identity by the victims themselves, and that re-centering of a sense of pride is a prerequisite for a politics of resistance and reconstruction.

In this system, "hair functions as a key 'ethnic signifier' because, compared with bodily shape or facial features, it can be changed more easily by cultural practices such as straightening." Racism originally "'politicized' [kinky] hair by burdening it with a range of negative social and psychological 'meanings'"—categorizing it as a problem. Ethnic difference that could be easily manipulated, like hair, was altered in order for ethnic minorities to assimilate into a dominant, Eurocentric society. Natural hairstyles, such as the Afro and dreadlocks, "counter-politicized the signifier of ethnic DE valorization, redefining Blackness as a positive attribute". By wearing their hair as it naturally grows, individuals with kinky hair were taking back agency in deciding the value and politics of their own hair. Wearing one's hair naturally also opens up a new debate: Are those who decide to still wear their hair straightened, for example, less 'Black' or 'proud' of their heritage, than those who decide to wear their hair naturally? This debate is an often-ongoing topic of discussion within the community. The issue is highly debated and disputed, creating almost a social divide within the community between those who decide to be natural and those who do not.

In the UK, the black diaspora has also faced societal issues when it comes to white centred beauty standards. An example of this is institutional racism that school students have historically faced in the UK, being treated differently by their school or teaching organisations with continued instances recorded at least up until 2016. This became such a controversial issue that pressure from pressure groups pushed the EHRC in Britain in 2022 to adopt new legislation to formally prevent hair discrimination in schools, being promoted more fully in 2023.

==== Emancipation and post-Civil War ====
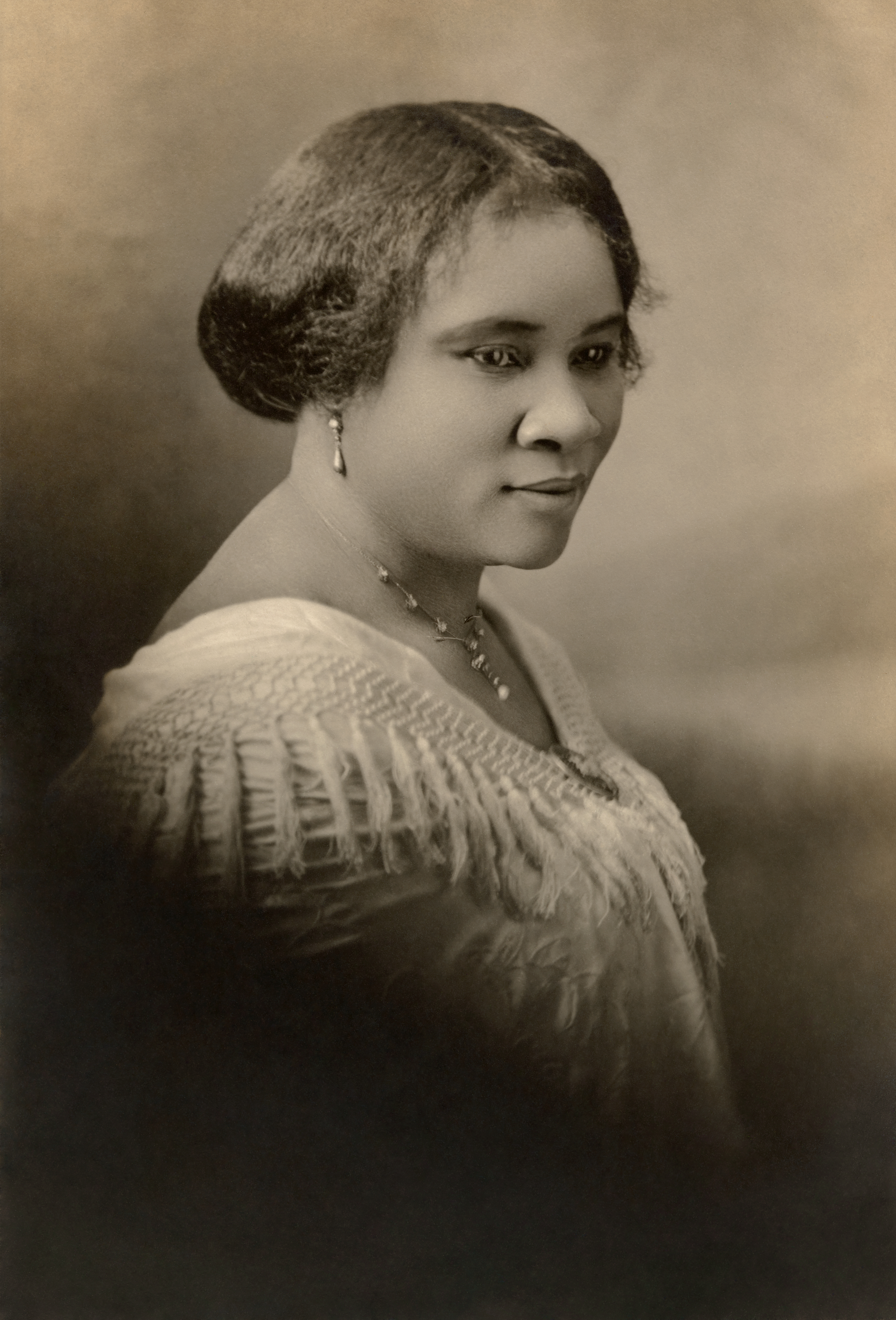
Successful entrepreneur Madam C. J. Walker invented a method that relaxed textured hair. Photo taken c. 1914.

After the American Civil War and emancipation, many African-Americans migrated to larger towns or cities, where they were influenced by new styles. The photos below show 19th-century women leaders with a variety of styles with natural hair. Others straightened their hair to conform to White beauty ideals. They wanted to succeed, and to avoid mistreatment including legal and social discrimination. Some women, and a smaller number of men, lightened their hair with household bleach. A variety of caustic products that contained bleaches, including laundry bleach, designed to be applied to kinky hair, were developed in the late 19th and early 20th centuries, as African Americans demanded more fashion options. They used creams and lotions, combined with hot irons, to straighten their hair.

The Black hair care industry was initially dominated by White-owned businesses. In the late 19th century, African-American entrepreneurs such as Annie Turnbo Malone, Madam C. J. Walker, Madam Gold S.M. Young, Sara Spencer Washington and Garrett Augustus Morgan revolutionized hair care by inventing and marketing chemical (and heat-based) applications to alter the natural tightly curled texture. They rapidly became successful and dominated the Black hair care market. In 1898, Anthony Overton founded a hair care company that offered saponified coconut shampoo and AIDA hair pomade. Men began using pomades, among other products, to achieve the standard aesthetic look.

During the 1930s, conking (vividly described in The Autobiography of Malcolm X) became an innovative method in the U.S. for Black men to straighten their kinky hair. Women at that time tended either to wear wigs, or to hot-comb their hair (rather than conk it) in order to temporarily mimic a straight style without permanently altering the natural curl pattern. Popular until the 1960s, the conk hair style was achieved through the application of a painful lye, egg and potato mixture that was toxic and immediately burned the scalp.

Black-owned businesses in the hair-care industry provided jobs for thousands of African-Americans. These business owners gave back strongly to the African-American community. During this time, hundreds of African-Americans became owner-operators of successful beauty salons and barbershops. These offered permanents and hair-straightening, as well as cutting and styling services, some to both White and Black clients. In this era, men regularly went to barber shops to have their beards groomed, and some Black barbers developed exclusively White, elite clientele, sometimes in association with hotels or clubs. Media images tended to perpetuate the ideals of European beauty of the majority culture, even when featuring African-Americans.

African-Americans began sponsoring their own beauty events. The winners, many of whom wore straight hair styles and some of whom were of mixed race, adorned Black magazines and product advertisements. In the early 20th century, media portrayal of traditional African hair styles, such as braids and cornrows, was associated with African-Americans who were poor and lived in rural areas. In the early decades of the Great Migration, when millions of African Americans left the South for opportunities in northern and midwestern industrial cities, many African Americans wanted to leave this rural association behind.

Scholars debate whether hair-straightening practices arose out of Black desires to conform to a Eurocentric standard of beauty, or as part of their individual experiments with fashions and changing styles. Some believe that slaves and later African-Americans absorbed prejudices of the European slaveholders and colonizers, who considered most slaves as second-class, as they were not citizens. Ayana Byrd and Lori Tharp say that they believe the preference for Eurocentric ideas of beauty still pervades the Western world.

==== Rise of Black pride ====
Kinky hair has been through many different cycles. Slavery played a major role in the ups and downs of the pride that African-Americans take in their hair. "Everything I knew about American history I learned from looking at Black people's hair. It's the perfect metaphor for the African experiment here: the price of the ticket (for a journey no one elected to take), the toll of slavery, and the costs remaining. It's all in the hair. Like Jamaica Kincaid, who writes only about a character named Mother, I've decided to write only about hair: what we do to it, how we do it, and why. I figure this is enough", said Lisa Jones in an essay titled Hair Always and Forever.

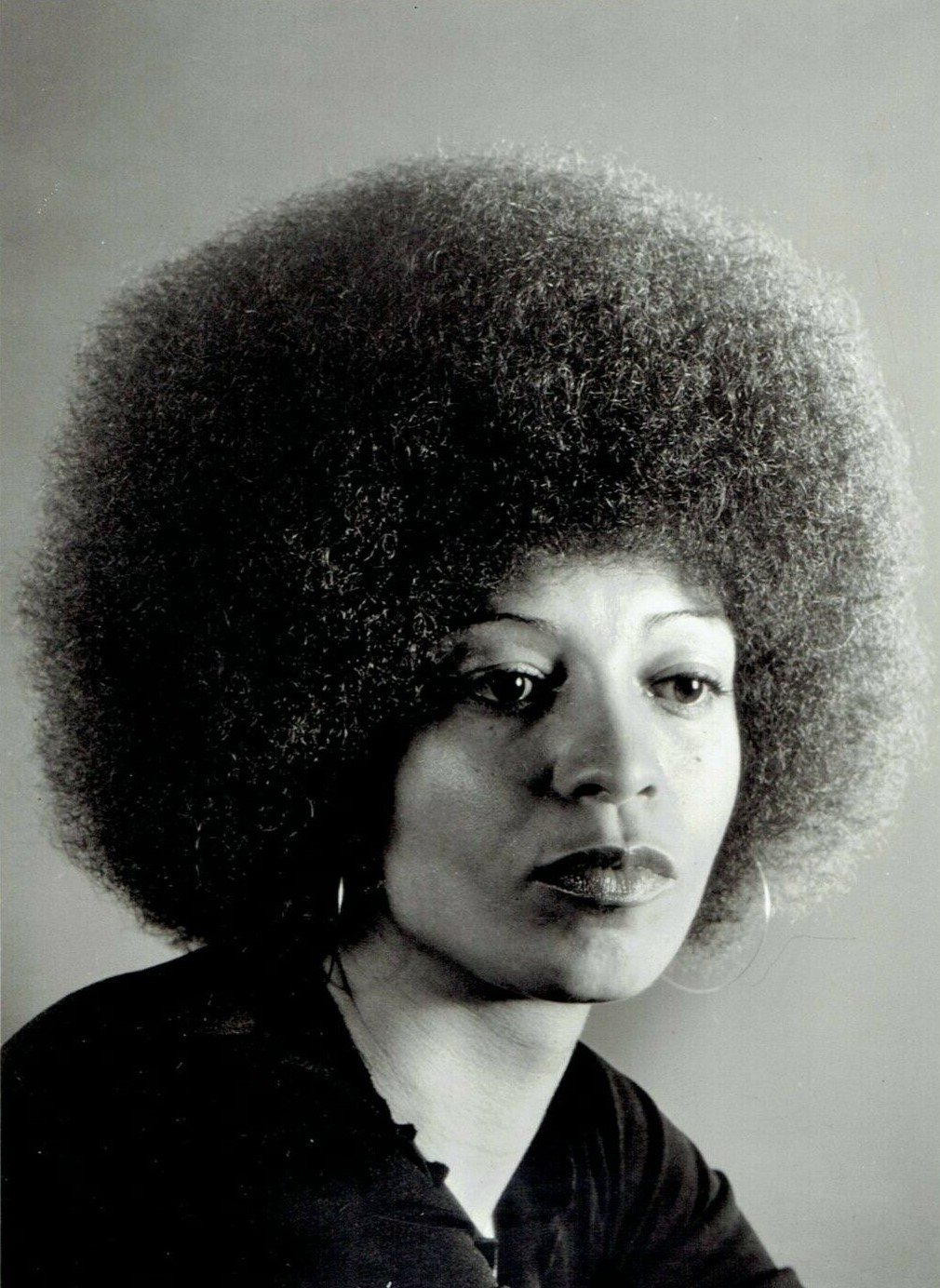
Civil rights activist Angela Davis wearing an Afro in 1973

Cheryl Thompson writes, "In 15th-century Africa, hairstyles were used to indicate a person's marital status, age, religion, ethnic identity, wealth and rank within the community (see Byrd & Tharps, 2001; Jacobs-Huey, 2006; Mercer, 1994; Patton, 2006; Rooks, 1996). For young black girls, Thompson says, "hair is not just something to play with" – it is something that sends a message, not only to the outside public but also a message on how they see themselves. "In the 1800s and early 1900s, nappy, kinky, curly hair was deemed inferior, ugly and unkempt in comparison with the flowing, bouncy hair of people from other cultures", says Marcia Wade Talbert in Black Enterprise. Chemical relaxers increased in demand throughout the 1800s and 1900s. These relaxers often contained sodium hydroxide (lye) or guanidine hydroxide which result in hair breakage, thinning of the hair, slowing of hair growth, scalp damage and even hair loss, according to Gheni Platenburg in the article, "Black Women Returning to Their Natural Hair Roots".

In the United States, the successes of the civil rights movement, and the Black power and Black pride movements of the 1960s and 1970s, inspired African-Americans to express their political commitments by adopting more traditionally African styles. The Afro hairstyle developed as an affirmation of Black African heritage, expressed by the phrase, "Black is beautiful." Angela Davis wore her Afro as a political statement and started a movement toward natural hair. This movement influenced a generation, including celebrities like Diana Ross, whose Jheri curls took over the 1980s.

Since the late 20th century, Black people have experimented with a variety of styles, including cornrows, locks, braiding, hair twists and short, cropped hair, specifically designed for kinky hair. Natural hair blogs include Black Girl Long Hair (BGLH), Curly Nikki and Afro Hair Club. With the emergence of hip-hop culture and Jamaican influences like reggae music, more non-Black people have begun to wear these hairstyles as well. A new market has developed in such hair products as "Out of Africa" shampoo.

The popularity of natural hair has waxed and waned. In the early 21st century, a significant percentage of African-American women still straighten their hair with relaxers of some kind (either heat- or chemical-based). This is done despite the fact that prolonged application of such chemicals (or heat) can result in overprocessing, breakage and thinning of the hair. Rooks (1996) argues that hair-care products designed to straighten hair, which have been marketed by white-owned companies in African American publications since the 1830s, represent unrealistic and unattainable standards of beauty.

Sales of relaxers took a great fall among African-American women from 2010 to 2015. Many African-American women gave up relaxers to go back to their natural roots. Celebrities like Esperanza Spalding, Janelle Monáe and Solange Knowles have worn natural hair looks. During the same time period, the number of natural-hair support groups has increased. "I see a lot of women who have started to accept themselves and their hair". "They're encouraging their children to start accepting themselves. This is entirely new", according to Terry Shropshire in the article "Black Hair Relaxer Sales are Slumping Because Of This". Research has shown that relaxer sales dropped from $206 million in 2008 to $156 million in 2013. Meanwhile, sales of products for styling natural hair continued to rise. Chris Rock's documentary Good Hair has shown what many women go through to achieve the "European standard" of hair. "Weaves that cost thousands of dollars and relaxers that take way too much time. Black woman has finally decided that it was simply too much", according to the documentary.

=== Modern perceptions and controversies ===
"Hair Like Mine", a 2009 image of a White House staffer's African-American son touching President Barack Obama's head, checking to see if their hair felt the same, went viral in 2012.

Black hairstyles have been utilized to promote the idea of African-American identity. There have been numerous events in history that have shown disapproval of Black hair styles.

In 1971 Melba Tolliver, a WABC-TV correspondent, made national headlines when she wore an Afro while covering the wedding of Tricia Nixon Cox, daughter of President Richard Nixon. The station threatened to take Tolliver off the air until the story caught national attention.

In 1981 Dorothy Reed, a reporter for KGO-TV, the ABC affiliate in San Francisco, was suspended for wearing her hair in cornrows with beads on the ends. KGO called her hairstyle "inappropriate and distracting". After two weeks of a public dispute, an NAACP demonstration outside of the station, and negotiations, Reed and the station reached an agreement. The company paid her lost salary, and she removed the colored beads. She returned to the air, still braided, but beadless.

A 1998 incident became national news when Ruth Ann Sherman, a young White teacher in Bushwick, Brooklyn, introduced her students to the 1998 book Nappy Hair by African-American author Carolivia Herron. Sherman was criticized by some in the community, who thought that the book presented a negative stereotype (although it won three awards), but she was supported by most parents of her students.

On April 4, 2007, radio talk-show host Don Imus referred to the Rutgers University women's basketball team, who were playing in the Women's NCAA Championship game, as a group of "nappy-headed hos" during his Imus in the Morning show. Imus's producer Bernard McGuirk compared the game to "the jigaboos versus the wannabes", alluding to Spike Lee's film School Daze. Imus apologized two days later, after receiving widespread criticism. CBS Radio canceled Don Imus's morning show a week after the incident on April 12, 2007, firing both Imus and McGuirk.

During August 2007, The American Lawyer magazine reported that an unnamed junior Glamour Magazine staffer gave a presentation on the "Do's and Don'ts of Corporate Fashion" for Cleary Gottlieb, a New York City law firm. Her slide show included her negative comments about Black women wearing natural hairstyles in the workplace, calling them "shocking", "inappropriate", and "political". Both the law firm and Glamour Magazine issued apologies to the staff.

In 2009, Chris Rock produced Good Hair, a documentary film which addresses a number of issues pertaining to African-American hair. He explores the styling industry, the variety of styles now acceptable in society for African-American women's hair, and the relations of these to African-American culture.

The Kenyan model Ajuma Nasenyana has criticized a trend in her native Kenya that rejects the indigenous Black African physical standards of beauty in favour of those of other communities. In a 2012 interview with the Kenyan broadsheet the Daily Nation, she said,

[I]t seems that the world is conspiring in preaching that there is something wrong with Kenyan ladies' kinky hair and dark skin[...] Their leaflets are all about skin lightening, and they seem to be doing good business in Kenya. It just shocks me. It's not OK for a Caucasian to tell us to lighten our skin [...] I have never attempted to change my skin. I am natural. People in Europe and America love my dark skin. But here in Kenya, in my home country, some consider it not attractive.

In November 2012, the American actress Jada Pinkett Smith defended her daughter Willow's hair on Facebook after the girl was criticized for an "unkempt" look. "Even little girls should not be a slave to the preconceived ideas of what a culture believes a little girl should be", the actress said.

In 2014, Stacia L. Brown related her story of feeling anxious about how her hair was styled prior to walking in for a job interview in her article "My Hair, My Politics". Brown begins her story describing her "Big Chop", a phrase used to indicate cutting off the relaxed or processed hair. A couple months after her big chop, she entered the job market and became very nervous about how her hair would appear to interviewers. Luckily, none of the interviewers acknowledged her hair in a discriminating way. Brown later discussed the first appearance of "the bush" as a political statement and related it to her situation, worrying that her hair could be seen as a "professional liability". She then compared her natural hair, which is easier to style, and her relaxed hair, which is more accepted. Brown also incorporated examples of workplace discrimination toward Black hair styles. She recalls how "the Congressional Black Caucus took the U.S. military to task for its grooming policies, which barred cornrows, twists, and dreadlocks." Brown followed up with another example from the same year in which the Transportation Security Administration has "come under fire for disproportionately patting down black women's hair—especially their Afros." She continued, stating, "It's a practice TSA only agreed to stop a few months ago, when the agency reached an agreement with ACLU of Northern California, which had filed a complaint in 2012."

The perception of kinky hair, in the eyes of one with this hair type, may prefer to style their hair in a way that accentuates their racial background or they may conform to a more European hair style.

In 2016, the article "Beauty as violence: 'beautiful' hair and the cultural violence of identity erasure" discussed a study that was conducted at a South African university. 159 African female students looked at 20 pictures of various styles of kinky hair and categorized these styles as one of four types: African Natural Hair, Braided African Natural Hair, African Natural Augmented Braid, and European/Asian Hairstyles. The results showed that "only 15.1% of respondents identified the category of African natural hair as beautiful." Braided natural hair had 3.1%, braided natural augmented hair had 30.8%, and European/Asian hair had 51%. Author Toks Oyedemi speaks on these findings as, "evidences the cultural violence of symbolic indoctrination that involves the perception of beautiful hair as mainly of a European/Asian texture and style and has created a trend where this type of hair is associated with being beautiful and preferable to other hair texture, in this instance, natural African hair." This article shows the telling truth of how African girls feel about their own hair, a perception that demonstrates a lack of self acceptance.

This perception is reversed in another experiment, this time performed in the United States.

Published in 2016, the article entitled "African American Personal Presentation: Psychology of Hair and Self Perception" summarized an experimental procedure conducted in America, using data from five urban areas across the country and females ages 18–65. A questionnaire was administered which determined how "African American women internalize beauty and wearing of hair through examination of locus of control and self-esteem." The results showed a positive correlation between high internal locus of control and wearing hair in its natural state. American women have a feeling of empowerment when it comes to wearing their natural hair.

In 2019, the California State Assembly unanimously voted to pass the CROWN Act, a law that would prohibit discrimination based on hairstyle and hair texture. This was followed in coming years by similar laws in New York, New Jersey, Washington, Maryland, Virginia, and Colorado. In 2022, a similar law, the CROWN Act of 2022, was passed in the US House of Representatives.

=== In other diasporic African populations ===
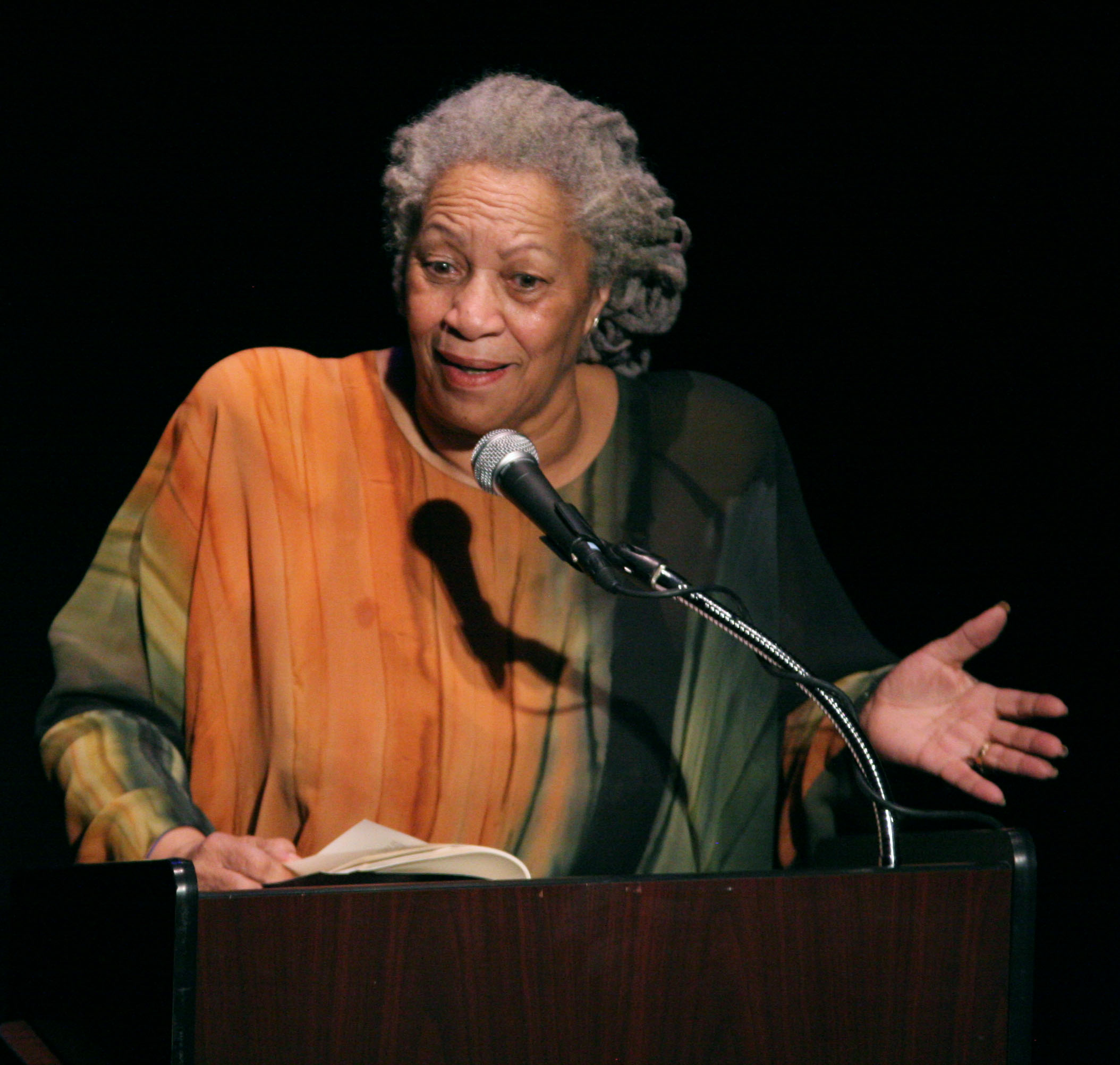
Toni Morrison, Nobel Prize–winning American author, with dreadlocks

During the 19th century, throughout the West Indies, the teachings of the Jamaican political leader Marcus Garvey encouraged an active rejection of European standards of beauty. The resulting Rastafari movement of the 20th century has maintained that the growth of freeform dreadlocks is related to divine illumination, largely informed by the Biblical Nazirite oath. The Rastafari movement has been so influential in the visibility and subsequent popularity of dreadlocks, throughout the Caribbean and in the global African diaspora, that the term rasta has become synonymous with a dreadlocked person. Today, dreadlocks are common among Afro-Caribbeans and Afro-Latin Americans.

== Styling ==
An example of a braid-out tutorial on natural hair

Over the years, natural hair styles and trends have varied through media influences and political climates. The care and styling of natural Black hair has become an enormous industry in the United States. Numerous salons and beauty supply stores cater solely to clients with natural kinky hair.

The Afro is a large, often spherical growth of kinky hair that became popular during the Black Power movement. The Afro has a number of variants including afro puffs (a cross between an Afro and pigtails) and a variant in which the Afro is treated with a blow dryer to become a flowing mane. The hi-top fade was common among African-American men and boys in the 1980s and has since been replaced in popularity by the 360 waves and the Caesar haircut.

Other styles include plaits or braids, the two-strand twist, and basic twists, all of which can form into manicured dreadlocks if the hair is allowed to knit together in the style-pattern. Basic twists include finger-coils and comb-coil twists. Dreadlocks, also called dreads, locks or locs, can also be formed by allowing the hairs to weave together on their own from an Afro. Another option is the trademarked "Sisterlocks" method, which produces what could be called very neat micro-dreadlocks. Faux locs, a type of synthetic dreadlock which is obtained using extensions, are another style.

Manicure locks—alternatively called salon locks or fashion locks—have numerous styling options that include strategic parting, sectioning and patterning of the dreads. Popular dreadlock styles include cornrows, the braid-out style or "lock crinkles", the basket weave and pipe-cleaner curls. Others include a variety of dreaded mohawks or lock-hawks, a variety of braided buns, and combinations of basic style elements.

Natural hair can also be styled into "Bantu knots", which involves sectioning the hair with square or triangular parts and fastening it into tight buns or knots on the head. Bantu knots can be made from either loose natural hair or dreadlocks. When braided flat against the scalp, natural hair can be worn as basic cornrows or form a countless variety of artistic patterns.

Other styles include the "natural" (also known as a "mini-fro" or "teenie weenie Afro") and "microcoils" for close-cropped hair, the twist-out and braid-out (in which hair is trained in twists or braids before being unravelled), "Brotherlocks" and "Sisterlocks", the fade, twists (Havana, Senegalese, crochet), faux locs, braids (Ghana, box, crochet, cornrows), Bantu knots, bubbles (where hair elastics are used to hold the hair and create bubbles), custom wigs and weaves or any combination of styles such as cornrows and Afro-puffs.

A majority of Black hairstyles involve parting the natural hair into individual sections before styling. Research shows that excessive braiding, tight cornrows, relaxing, and vigorous dry-combing of kinky hair can be harmful to the hair and scalp. They have also been known to cause ailments such as alopecia, excessive dry scalp, and bruises on the scalp. Keeping hair moisturized, trimming ends, and using very little to no heat will prevent breakage and split ends.

== See also ==
- Afro
- Artificial hair integrations (Hair weaves)
- Bad Hair
- Conk
- Cornrows
- Dreadlocks
- Good Hair
- Hair iron
- Hair Like Mine
- Hair loss (Alopecia)
- Hair straightening
- Hair twists
- Hi-top fade
- Hot comb
- Jheri curl
- List of hairstyles
- Natural hair movement
- Nubian wig
- Polish plait
- Relaxer
- Waves (hairstyle)
- Woolly hair, an unrelated condition
