= Hair twists =

Hairstyle

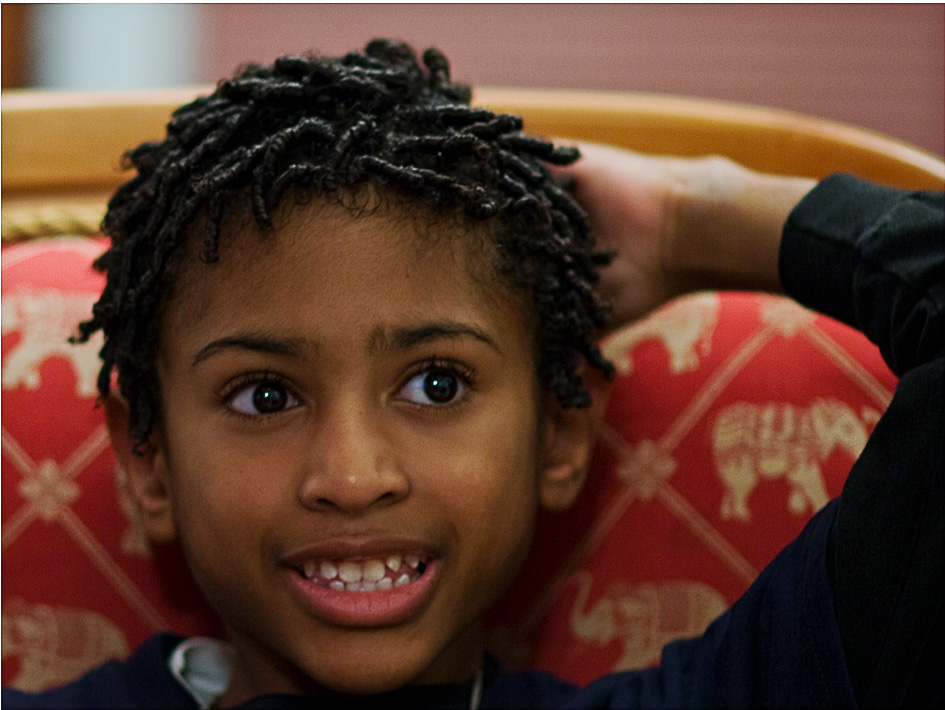
Short twists worn by a young boy

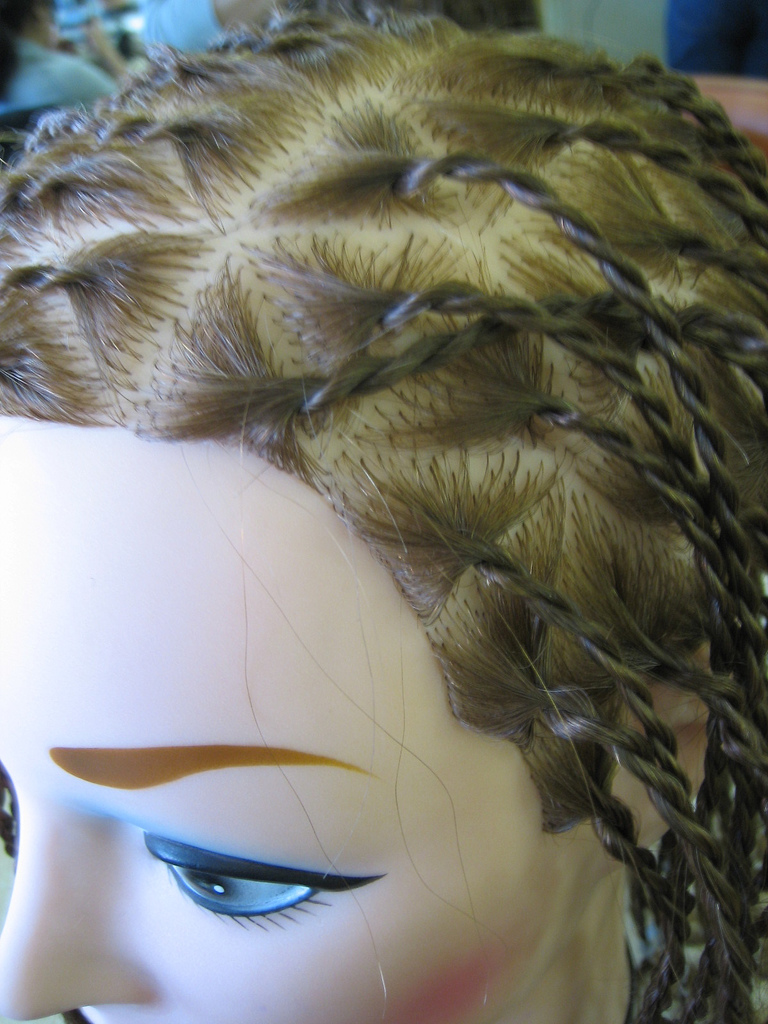
Two-stranded twists demonstrated on a hairstylist's mannequin

Hair twists, flat twists, or mini-twists, are a hairstyle popular with kinky hair around the world, and sometimes with other hair textures. The style is achieved by dividing the hairs into several sections, twisting strands of hair, then twisting two twisted strands around one another. They can also be created with one strand of hair at a time, with a comb. They are not to be confused with larger, longer dreadlocks, (or "locs").

Twists can be made when naturally curly hair is still wet and somewhat relaxed from soaking with hot water; when the hair dries, it will shrink, creating a tightly woven texture to the hair twists. Twists can also be done with dry hair for a different texture. Twists can be combined with other hairstyles at the same time, such as afro-puffs and Afro.

In order to maintain twist hairstyles, wearers are advised by hairstylists to cover their hair with a headscarf or durag at night.

On July 3, 2019, California became the first US state to prohibit discrimination over natural hair. Governor Gavin Newsom signed the CROWN Act into law, banning employers and schools from discriminating against hairstyles such as twists, braids, afros, and locks. Likewise, later in 2019 Assembly Bill 07797 became law in New York state; it "prohibits race discrimination based on natural hair or hairstyles."

== Twist out ==
A variation of hair twists is called a "twist out", where twisted hair is untwisted to create a large, loosely crimped texture. There are two different variations to a "twist out," one method can be done with using two stands of hair and another method uses three stands of hair called a "three stand twist out". Both result in a textured hairstyle when untwisted.

Other twist hairstyles include Senegalese twists, Marley twists, and Havana twists. All of these hairstyles require specific types of hair extensions that are installed to one's head. These styles have been labeled as protective styles because they protect the person's natural hair from daily manipulation. Senegalese twists originated in Senegal, Africa and are commonly performed in African hair salons across the U.K, Canada, and the U.S. This style uses synthetic Kanekalon hair, which can last anywhere from one to three months. Marley and Havana twists are more recent hairstyles widely spread through the black hair community in 2013. They look very similar to one another, but have distinct differences. Marley twists use Marley hair extensions that can be found in most hair supply stores from various hair companies and Havana twists use Havana hair extensions sold by few companies that are only available online. Havana twists are generally done with fewer twists than the Marley hairstyle and also weigh less in density because the hair is much fluffier in texture than Marley hair. Both hairstyles like Senegalese can last from one to three months, but should not be kept in for a longer period of time. Due to the technique of these hairstyles a person's natural hair can begin to get matted or form into dreadlocks.

== See also ==
- List of hairstyles
