= Body wave =

Body wave may refer to one of the following:

- Body wave (seismology), a type of seismic wave
- Body wave (dance move)
- Body wave (hair style)
- Body wave (locomotion), also called undulatory locomotion, in animals
- Body Waves, a 1992 comedy film directed by P.J. Pesce
