= Conk =

Hairstyle

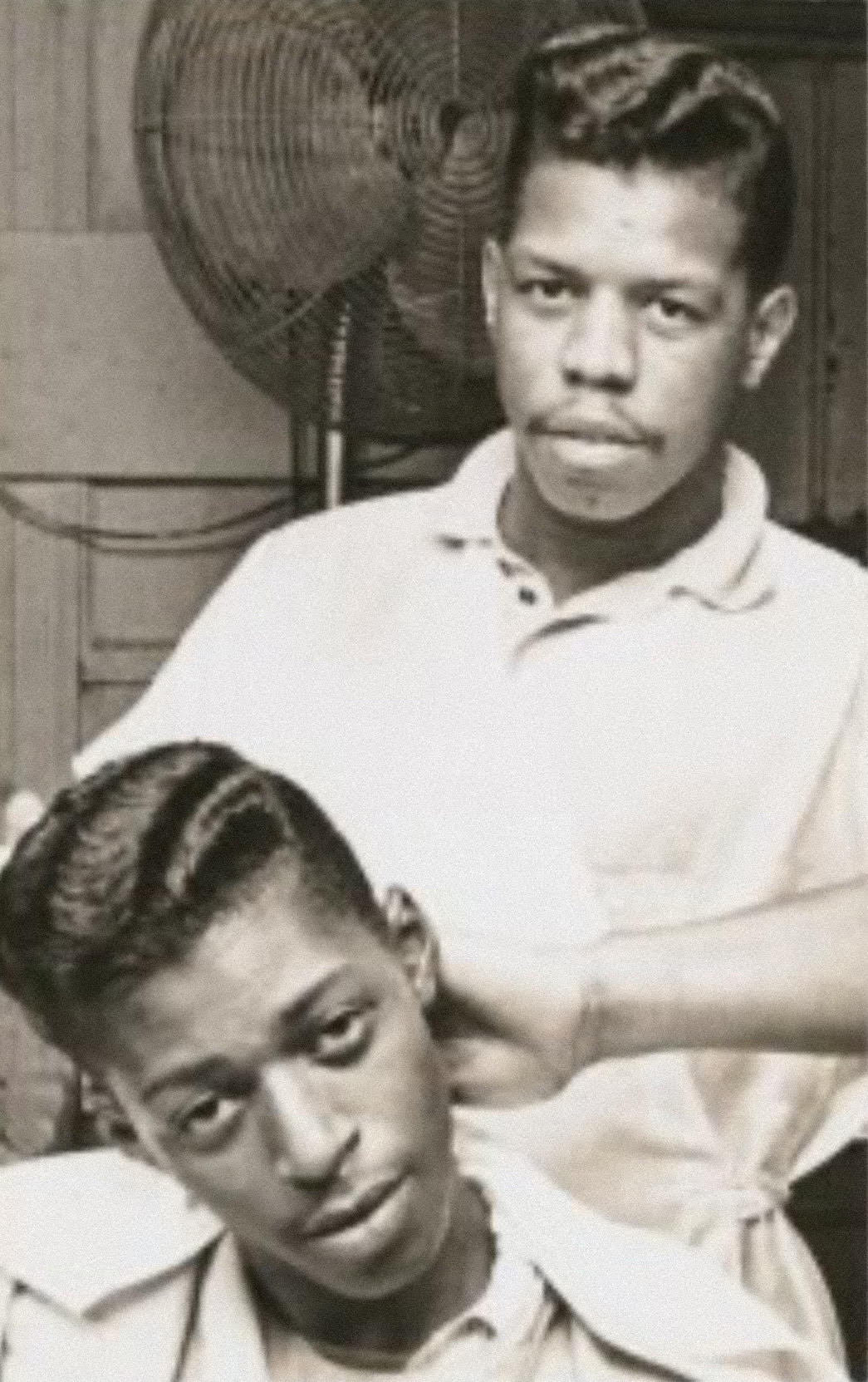
Conk hairstyle

The conk was a hairstyle popular among African-American men from the 1920s up to the early-to-mid 1960s. This hairstyle called for a man with naturally kinky hair to have it chemically straightened using a relaxer called congolene, an initially homemade hair straightener gel made from the extremely corrosive chemical lye which was often mixed with eggs and potatoes. The applier had to wear gloves and the solution timed just right on the applicant's head and then thoroughly rinsed out with cold water to avoid chemical burns. The desired outcome was for the newly straightened hair to be easily styled in the popular "conk" style of that era.

== History ==
Conks were often styled as large pompadours although other men chose to simply slick their straightened hair back, allowing it to lie flat on their heads. Regardless of the styling, conks required a considerable amount of effort to maintain: a man often had to wear a durag of some sort at home, to absorb sweat or other agents to keep them from causing his hair to revert prematurely to its natural state. Also, the style required repeated application of relaxers; as new hair grew in, it too had to be chemically straightened.

Many of the popular musicians of the early to mid-20th century, including Chuck Berry, Little Richard, Bo Diddley, Fats Domino, Louis Jordan, James Brown, members of The Temptations and The Miracles, Nat King Cole, and Sammy Davis Jr. were well known for sporting the conk hairstyle. The gatefold of Muddy Waters' 1968 album Electric Mud shows the older blues legend still sporting conked hair.

The conk trend and style fell out of popularity when the Black Power/Black Pride movement of the 1960s took hold. The Afro and the Natural quickly became a popular symbol of African pride. The Afro was worn as an outright symbol of protest for social justice and equal rights, a change in mores and a demand for independent thinking. Depending upon the length, the Afro was referred to as either "moderate" or "full". Examples of the full Afro can be seen in 1968 photos of Angela Davis and Jimi Hendrix, the moderate Afro can be seen in 1968 photos of Richard Pryor and Muhammad Ali.

Examples of the Natural, short cropped 2 to 4 inches from the scalp or cut very close to the scalp, can be seen in pre-1969 photos of Stevie Wonder and Marvin Gaye. The Natural was considered a "business man's" hairstyle and was generally accepted by businesses and schools. It was not as subversive, controversial or threatening to non-African-Americans as the Afro, or long hair below the collar worn by those with straight hair. African-American women began wearing the Natural by the 1970s and onward.

In the 1965 book The Autobiography of Malcolm X, it is mentioned that at one point the prevalence of the conk hairstyle, "makes you wonder if the Negro has completely lost all sense of identity, lost touch with himself".

The conk is all but extinct as a hairstyle among African-American men today, although more mildly and safely relaxed hairstyles such as the Jheri curl and the S-Curl were popular during the 1980s and 1990s.

== In popular culture ==
The conk was a major plot device in Spike Lee's film biography Malcolm X, based upon Malcolm X's own condemnation of the hairstyle in his autobiography due to its implications of the superiority of a more "white" appearance and because of the pain the process causes and the possibility of receiving severe burns to the scalp. In his book, Malcolm described the process as degrading and painful: “my first really big step toward self-degradation: when I endured all of that pain, literally burning my flesh to have it look like a white man’s hair” (X 66).

In 2009, actor, comedian, and director Chris Rock starred in a documentary called Good Hair, which focuses on the beliefs, origins and evolution of hairstyles among the African-American community, including the conk.

== See also ==
- List of hairstyles
- Relaxer
