= Leo Passage =

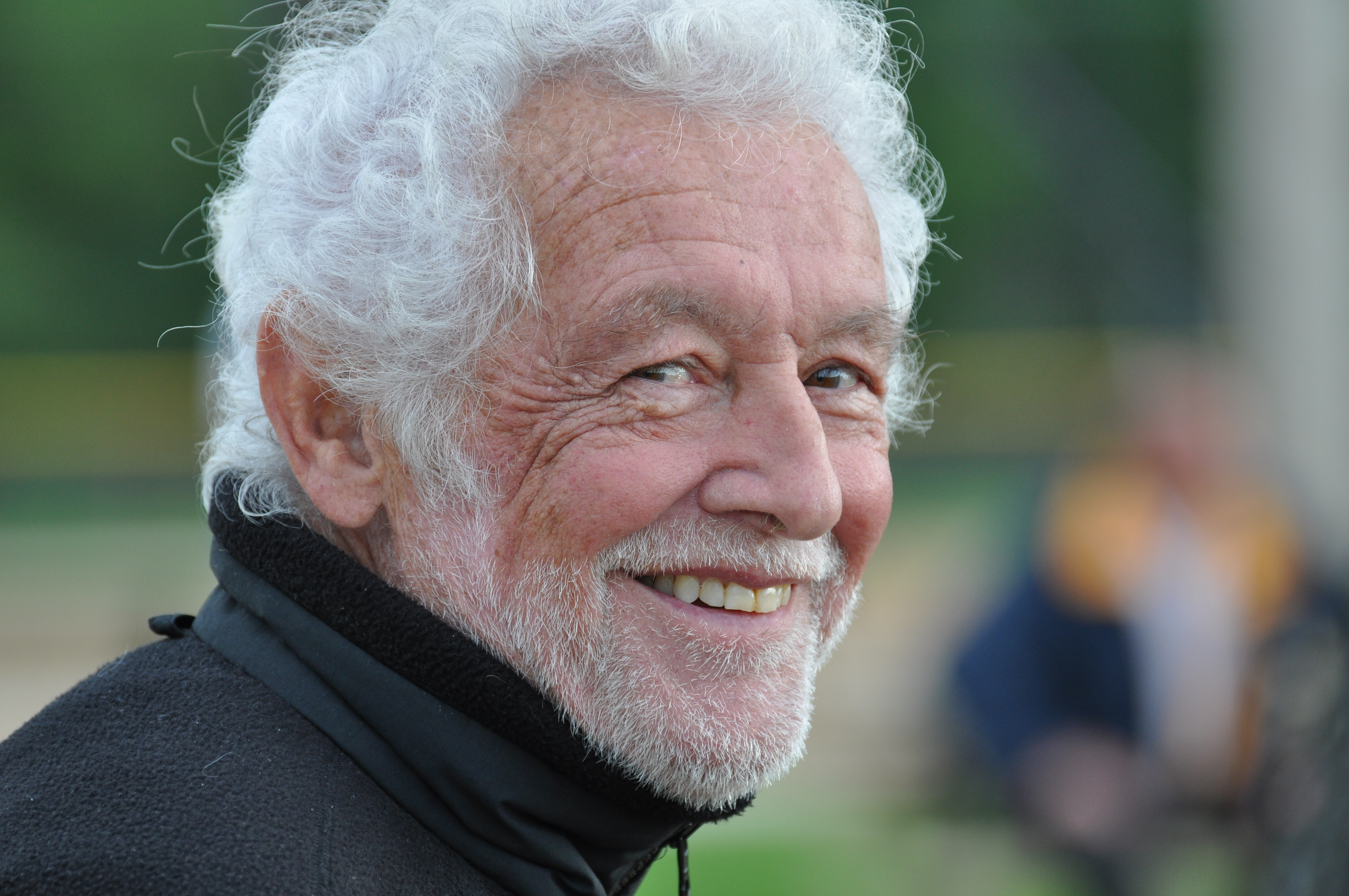
Leo Passage in 2010

Leonardus Johannes Hubertus "Leo" Passage ([pɒ.'sɒʒ]; March 21, 1936 – May 11, 2011) was a Dutch-born American hairstylist, educator, innovator and philanthropist. He was the founder and CEO of Pivot Point International, a global hair and beauty education company he established in Chicago, Illinois in 1962.

As a hairstylist and cosmetology educator, Passage received over 100 international awards and honors and influenced many prominent hairstylists. In 1988, he received the Spirit of Life Award from City of Hope for his philanthropic efforts. He was named one of Modern Salon's "50 Influential Hairdressers" in 2008, and was inducted into the Cosmetology Hall of Fame in 1989.

== Career ==
By the age of 22, Passage had earned his Design Certificate and Master Diploma in the Netherlands and had received the Champions of Holland award, earning him a spot on the Dutch Olympic Hairdressing Team, among other honors.

Passage emigrated to the United States in 1958. By 1960, he had earned World Supreme Hairdresser of the Year and was a National Cosmetology Association (NCA) Charles Award recipient. That year, the World Hairdressing Federation formed the first U.S. Olympic Hairdressing Team, and Passage became a member and trainer, qualifying him as a two-country hairdressing Olympian.

In 1962, Passage opened Pivot Point Beauty School in Chicago, which would later become Pivot Point International. At the time of Passage's death, Pivot Point's hair and beauty curriculum was taught in 2,000 schools in over 70 countries and in 15 languages.

== Innovation ==
Passage and Pivot Point International hold three U.S. patents on cosmetology educational aids and Passage is credited with the development of cone-shaped rollers, which allowed stylists to create more complex patterns in contemporary hairstyles.

A competition-grade hair mannequin of Passage's design, "Mara," was the subject of a legal dispute beginning in 1990 when a competing distributor produced a mannequin, "Liza," that Passage alleged had infringed Mara's copyright. That case was unique enough for Mara and Liza to appear as teaching tools at Harvard Law School.

== Legacy ==
By Passage's death, Pivot Point's cosmetology curriculum had produced over 1 million alumni, including Andre Walker. "Leo Passage is responsible for my cosmetology education," said Walker upon learning of Passage's death. "Being in his presence, I learned a tremendous amount about hair styling, but most of all, I learned that being kind and giving and professional was most important.... He was a major force."

In 2011, the annual Leo Passage Educator of the Year Award was established by Intercoiffure America/Canada (ICA) in Passage's memory, acknowledging ICA members who have made outstanding contributions to education.

== Personal life ==
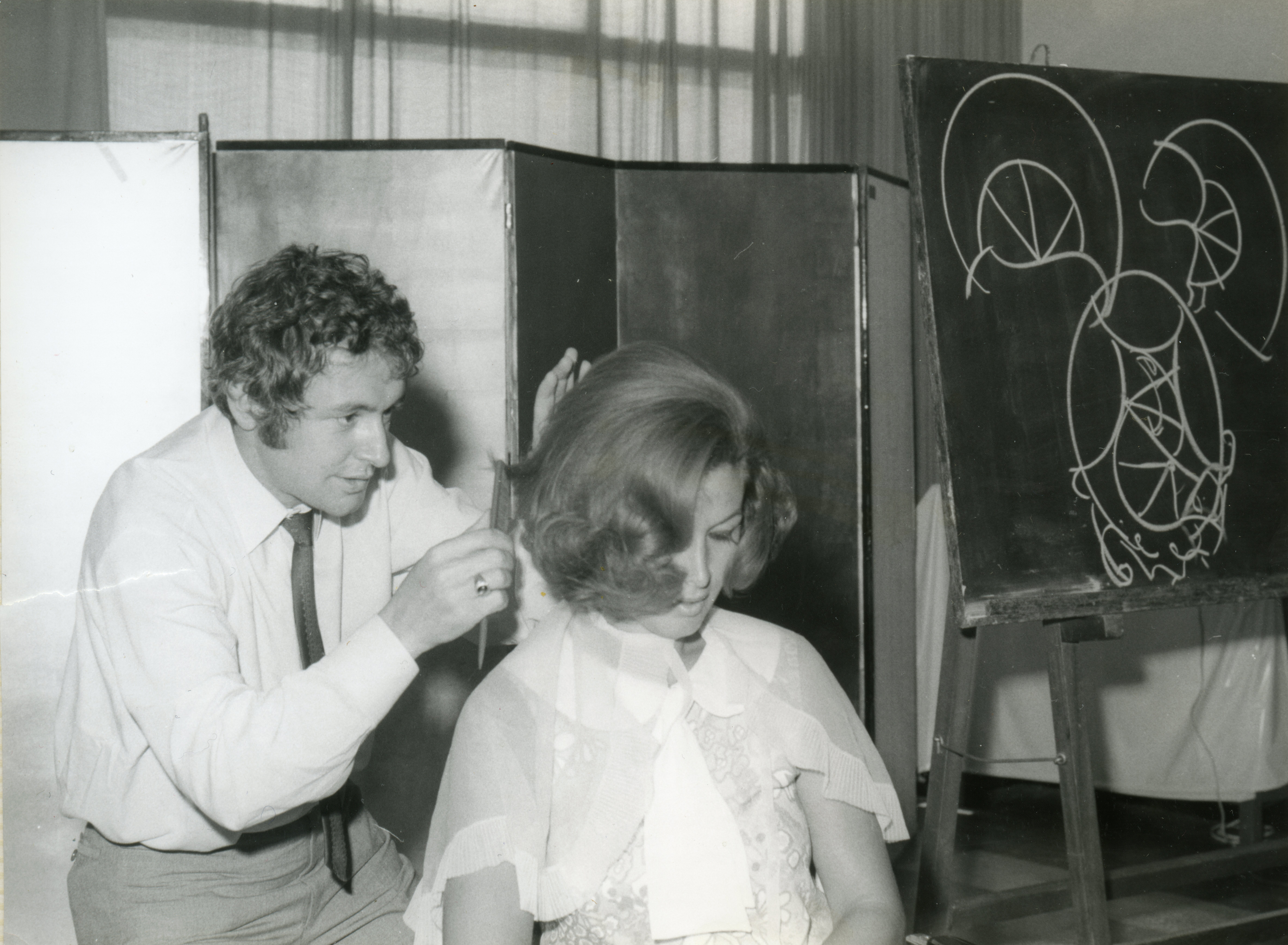
Leo and Lenie Passage, mid-1960s

=== Family ===
Passage married Helena "Lenie" Plantaz (b. 29 May 1940) in the Netherlands on 19 November 1958. They emigrated to the United States two weeks later. The Passages had two children, Robert (b. 1960) and Corrine (1962–2012). Robert Passage is current Chairman and C.E.O. of Pivot Point International and serves on several cosmetology industry boards of directors.

== Honors and awards ==
In 1988, Passage received the Spirit of Life Award from the City of Hope National Medical Center. The Spirit of Life Award recognizes leaders in their industries who provide distinguished service to their communities. It is the highest honor given by the City of Hope.

In 1989, Passage was inducted into the Cosmetology Hall of Fame, considered to be the highest award within the industry. This was presented at the Hall of Fame Gala of NCA's 69th Annual Convention in July 1989.

In 2005, he received the inaugural Pillar of Leadership in Education for support and service through education and inspiration. He also received a lifetime award from HairAmerica Ladies and Gents.

In 2008, Passage received the distinguished Visionary of the Year Award at the Intercoiffure America/Canada (ICA) meeting in recognition of his "revolutionary approach to hair design education and commitment to elevating the cosmetology industry through lifelong learning."

Also in 2008, he was named one of the 50 most influential hairdressers by Modern Salon magazine.
