= Andre Walker =

American hairstylist

- Born: October 19, 1956; Chicago, Illinois
- Occupation: Hairstylist
- Known for: Hairstylist of Oprah Winfrey

Andre Walker (born October 19, 1956, in Chicago, Illinois) is a hairstylist from Chicago who developed the Andre Walker Hair Typing System and served as personal hairstylist to Oprah Winfrey from 1985 to 2015. He created Halle Berry's signature short pixie haircut. Walker's other celebrity clients include Barbara Bush, Roseanne Barr, and Michelle Obama. Walker has won seven Daytime Emmy Awards for Outstanding Achievement in Hairstyling for his work on The Oprah Winfrey Show.

== Early life and career ==
Andre Walker is the son of Woodrow Walker Sr. and Fannie Mae Walker. He grew up in Chicago, and his mother and sister were his first hair clients. He attended Lindbloom Technical High School and later enrolled at Pivot Point Beauty College. After graduating from the program, Walker began working as a hairstylist and opened his own salon in downtown Chicago. In 1986, Walker sent a letter and a dozen roses to Oprah Winfrey offering to style her hair. She accepted, and Walker styled her hair for three decades over a large variety of hairdos.

Oprah Winfrey wrote in the introduction to the book Andre Talks Hair, that prior to meeting Walker she had a hairdresser who did not rinse a light perm completely, and that "my hair started to fall out in patches. Again. And once again, I shaved my head down to a little teeny weeny Afro. I was batting zero with hairdressers. Until I met Andre."

For his work on The Oprah Winfrey Show, Walker won seven Daytime Emmy Awards for Outstanding Achievement in Hairstyling in 1989, 1990, 1993, 1994, 1996, 1997 and 2003. He was nominated for this award a further seven times (in 1987, 1988, 1998, 1999, 2004, 2005 and 2006). He wrote the book Andre Talks Hair with Teresa Wiltz, published by Simon & Schuster in 1997. In 2008, Pivot Point International awarded Walker its inaugural L.E.O. Award, named for Pivot Point founder Leo Passage. Walker thanked Pivot Point for encouraging him to "do almost anything" in the field of hair design. Walker received the Thurgood Marshall Fashion Icon Award in 2009.

In the 1990s, he created the Andre Walker Hair Typing System to market his line of hair care products, which has since been widely adopted as a hair type classification system. He stepped down as Oprah's hairstylist in 2015 to focus on his hair product business.

== Personal life ==
Andre Walker has four sisters (Doris Thomas, Gwen Thomas, Pamela Walker, and Robbin Walker) and two brothers (Woodrow Walker Jr and Bernard Walker). He enjoys cooking and interior decorating.
