= Andre Walker Hair Typing System =

Classification system for hair types

The Andre Walker Hair Typing System, also known as The Hair Chart, is a classification system for hair types created in the 1990s by Oprah Winfrey's stylist Andre Walker. It was originally created to market Walker's line of hair care products but has since been widely adopted as a hair type classification system. Walker's system includes images of each hair type to aid classification. The system has been criticized for an apparent hierarchy which values Caucasian hair over other hair types. In 2018 the system was the subject of episodes of the podcasts 99% Invisible and The Stoop.

== Types ==
The system is split into four types with subtypes labeled A, B and C for some of the types. The system has added new subtypes since its original version to Type 1.

Type	Hair texture	Hair description
1a	Straight (fine)	Hard to hold a curl, hair tends to be oily, hard to damage.
1b	Straight (medium)	Has much body. (i.e. more volume, more full).
1c	Straight (coarse)	Hard to curl (i.e. bone straight).
2a	Wavy (loose waves)	Can accomplish various styles. Loose "S" pattern. Hair sticks close to the head.
2b	Wavy (defined waves)	A bit resistant to styling. Hair has more of a defined "S" pattern. Hair tends to be frizzy.
2c	Wavy (wide waves)	Hair has wider waves. Resistant to styling. Hair tends to be frizzy.
3a	Curly (loose curls)	Thick and full with much body. Definite curl pattern. Hair tends to be frizzy. Can have a combination texture.
3b	Curly (tight curls)	Medium amount of space of the curls. Can have a combined texture.
3c	Curly (corkscrews)	Tight curls in corkscrews. The curls are very tightly curled.
4a	Kinky-coily (defined coil)	Tightly coiled. Has a very defined O-shaped pattern.
4b	Kinky-coily (z coil)	Tightly coiled. Little less defined kink pattern. Has more of a Z-shaped pattern.
4c	Kinky-coily (tight peppercorn coil)	Tightly coiled. Almost no visible defined kink pattern, unless seen from up close. Has more of a very tight O-shaped peppercorn pattern. Also called peppercorn hair; most commonly found among the Khoisan ethnic group

== Evaluation ==
There has been a lot of debate in the black/curly hair community over the validity of the classification. The Walker system has been judged an improvement on some earlier systems that ranked black hair as less desirable, but is criticized for not taking into account the full variation in density and scalp types or that people's hair can vary on different parts of their heads.

Research in the International Journal of Women's Dermatology has suggested Walker's curl-classification system may be useful in conversations about alopecia and other health conditions.

== See also ==
- Kinky hair
