= Durag =

Type of men's headscarf to maintain hair positioning

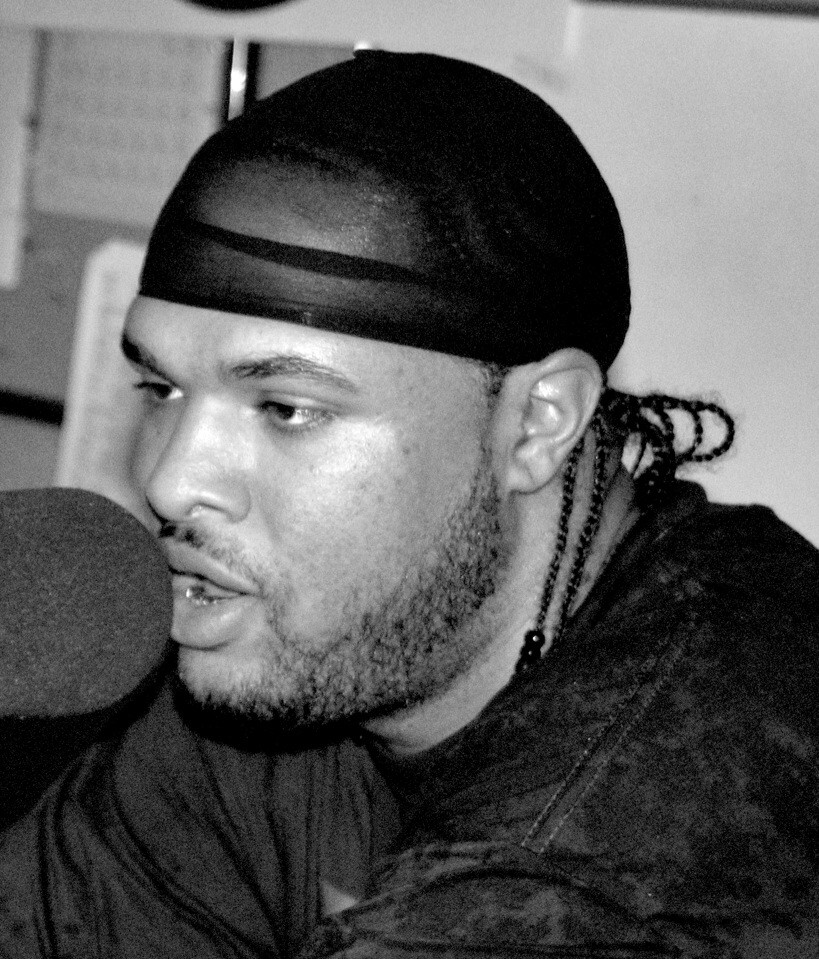
- American rapper Slim Thug wearing a durag in 2005
- Type: Cap
- Material: Silk, satin, polyester, and/or cotton
- Place of origin: United States
- Introduced: 20th century

A durag or do-rag is a close-fitting cloth tied around the top of the head to protect the hair; similarly a wave cap is a close-fitting cap for the same purpose. Durags and wave caps originated in the African American community. Durags may be worn to accelerate the development of long curly/kinky hair, waves or locks in the hair; to maintain natural oils in hair (as would a bonnet); to stop hair breakage; to manage the hair in general; or to keep hair, wave patterns, and braids from shifting in sleep. For these reasons, durags are popular among Black people.

== Spelling and etymology ==
Numerous alternative spellings exist for durag, including do-rag, dew-rag, and doo-rag, all of which may be spelled with a space instead of a hyphen, or with neither a hyphen nor a space. The simplest etymology for do-rag is that it is named as such because it is a rag worn to protect one's hairdo (colloquially clipped to 'do or simply do in African-American Vernacular English, among other dialects). An alternative etymology claims that name should be spelled dew-rag, and dew is a euphemism for sweat.

=== Early usage ===
The Oxford English Dictionary dates the first published usage of "do-rag" to the 1964 Facing Reality pamphlet Negro Americans take the Lead, written by Martin Glaberman. The pamphlet noted that in the wake of the 1963 Detroit Walk to Freedom, "the leading local newspaper announced it would feature a one-a-week column by a prominent local Negro. Trying to be a laborer worthy of his hire, the prominent local figure wrote a column denouncing 'do-rags.' The common habit of wearing a silk stocking over the head, presumably to protect the setting, aroused his ire."

Other early published usages include:

- In the August 27, 1965, edition of LIFE magazine, a page 22 photo caption describes a man wearing a "'do-rag' on his new hair-do".
- On June 4, 1966, the Akron Beacon Journal printed "do rag ... a cloth band worn around the forehead as a sweatband or to keep hair in place".
- On September 2, 1966, the Dayton Daily News printed "the man with the black dew rag... one with the black bandana".
- In late 1966, "do rag ... processed hair done up in black rags" appeared in Newsweek.

The Merriam-Webster online dictionary places the earliest usage of do-rag in 1968.

== History ==
During the Black Pride movement of the 1960s and '70s, durags became a fashion statement. William J. Dowdy (founder of the brand So Many Waves) is said to have mass-produced the first modern "tie-down" durag in 1979 to protect hair patterns.

In the 1990s, durags were further popularized by rappers like Jay-Z, Nelly, and 50 Cent. The popularity of rappers such as A$AP Ferg and the waves hairstyle have re-popularized the use of durags.

=== Bans and controversy ===
In 1995, the National Football League (NFL) considered banning players from wearing "bandanas, known as do-rags." League executive Gene Washington said durags were associated with crime and gang violence but insisted that the idea was "driven largely by black people, not white people." Safety Merton Hanks said that he wore one because it made his helmet fit better and was therefore akin to safety equipment. Ultimately, the league decided to take no action. In 2001, however, the league owners voted 30–1 to ban players from wearing all headwear under helmets except for "skull caps" in what the league claimed was "a matter of image." Although there were concerns that the move may have been racially biased, the league again framed the ban as being originated by black members of their competition committee, including Denny Green. Some players argued unsuccessfully that wearing durags under helmets helped them prevent hair loss.

During a preseason game in 2000, the National Basketball Association (NBA) told Indiana Pacers player Sam Perkins that he could not wear a durag because it was "a safety hazard." In October 2005, the NBA issued a dress code which, among other changes, forbade players from wearing durags not just on the court but while engaged in any manner of team or league business.

Some United States high schools have attempted to ban the wearing of durags. When John Muir High School in Pasadena, California, banned durags as part of a school dress-code policy, the Black Student Union staged a peaceful walk-out in February 2019. Protesting students contended that school administrators banned the headwear because of its affiliation with gang culture, although the principal claimed that durags were banned because "of values we have for how we present ourselves at school".

== In popular culture ==
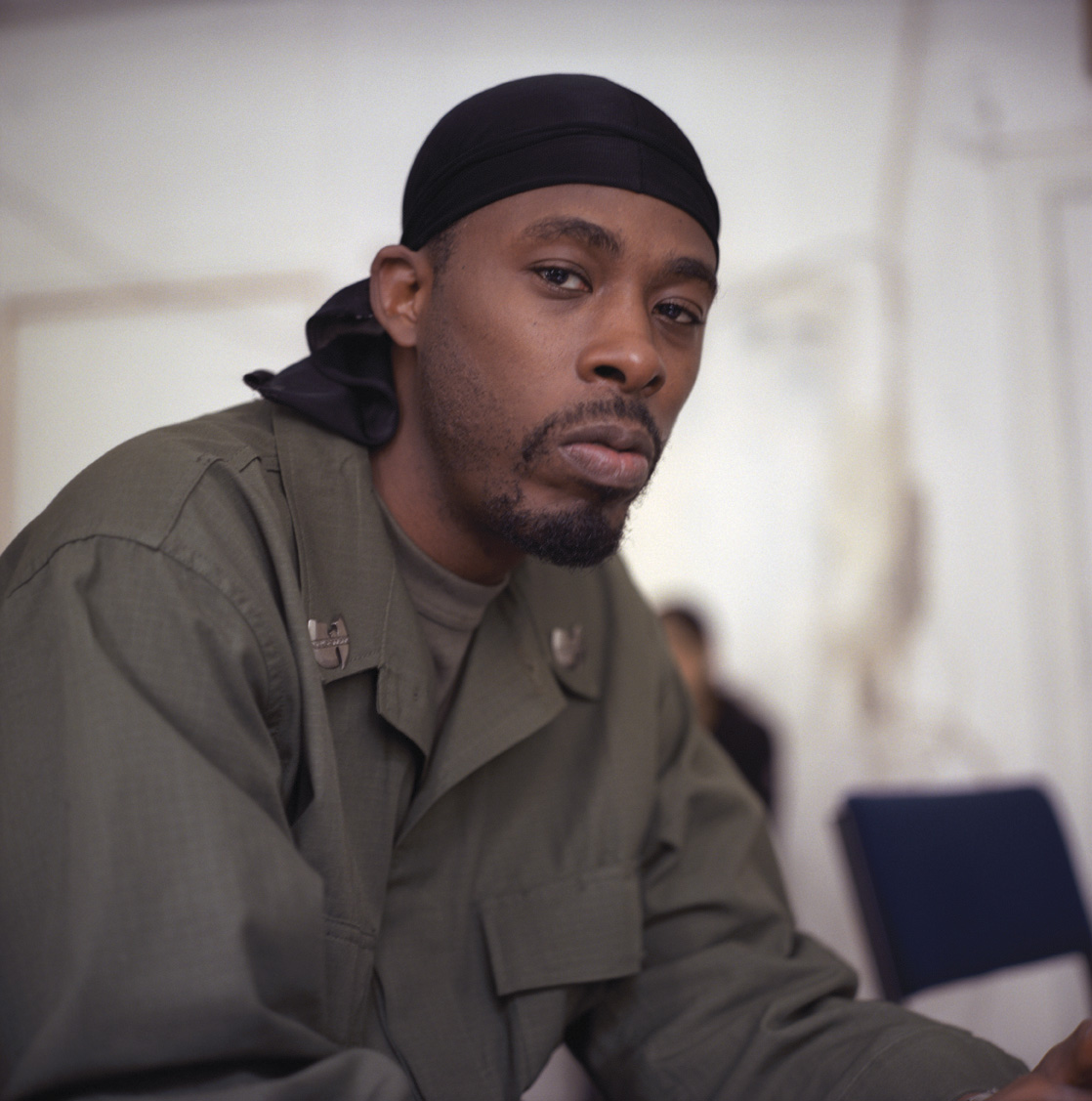
GZA wearing a durag in 2000

The 1974 song "Uncle Remus," co-written by Frank Zappa and George Duke, includes the lyric, "I can't wait till my Fro is full-grown / I'll just throw 'way my Doo-Rag at home."

American singer and bassist Thundercat's 2020 album It Is What It Is features the song entitled "Dragonball Durag". The lyrics references the headwear as the title piece to impress women. The durag referenced has a pattern taken from popular Japanese television cartoon Dragon Ball. Rapper Royce da 5'9" has a song on the 2020 album The Allegory entitled "Rhinestone Doo Rag". Rihanna wore a durag on the cover of the British Vogue in 2020, marking a milestone of durags as seen as a fashion symbol.

In 2021, contestant Symone wore an outfit with a durag, which extended to a train, on the thirteenth season of RuPaul's Drag Race. The rapper Baby Keem, with a feature from Travis Scott, released a single in 2021 with the name "durag activity".

The character of Leon Black on Curb Your Enthusiasm is famous for wearing his durag on the show. Kvarforth, frontman of the Swedish depressive suicidal black metal band Shining, is known to wear a durag as part of his onstage look, in contrast to the corpse paint traditionally synonymous with black metal.

== See also ==
- Kerchief
- List of headgear
