= Waves (hairstyle) =

Hairstyle

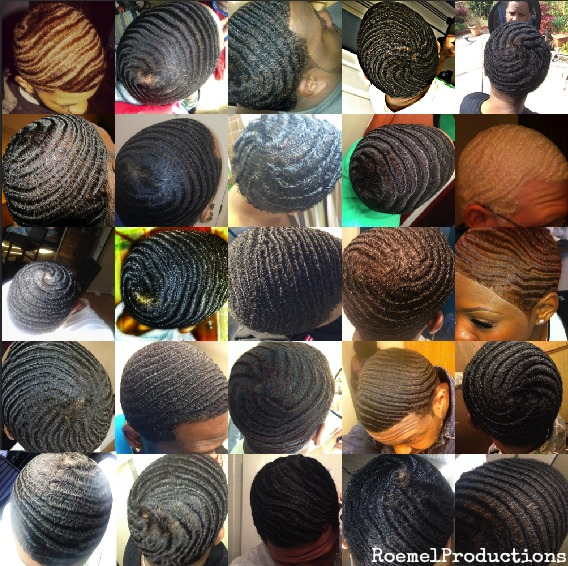
360 wave process hair waves

Waves are a hairstyle for kinky and curly hair in which the curls are brushed and/or combed and flattened out, creating a ripple-like pattern. The hairstyle is achieved with a short-cropped haircut on top and frequent brushing and/or combing of the curls (which trains the curls to flatten out), as well as the wearing of a silky durag or a wave cap to add extra strength to flatten longer hair types. The durag is worn to preserve moisture while compressing the hair and holding it in place to create the desired waves.

Wave pomades and moisturizers can help hold the hair in place while preventing the hair from getting too dry. Those who grow out their hair for several weeks in order to develop deeper, better-defined waves are said to be "wolfing" their waves.

In the early 20th century, as many African-American men sought to style their hair with texture-altering products, "pomade hair moisturizer" waves became a popular hairstyle. Men produced waves by washing and brushing their hair then putting on their durags right after putting on their choice of moisturizer.

== See also ==
- List of hairstyles
