= Nubian wig =

Form of headdress worn by ancient Egyptians

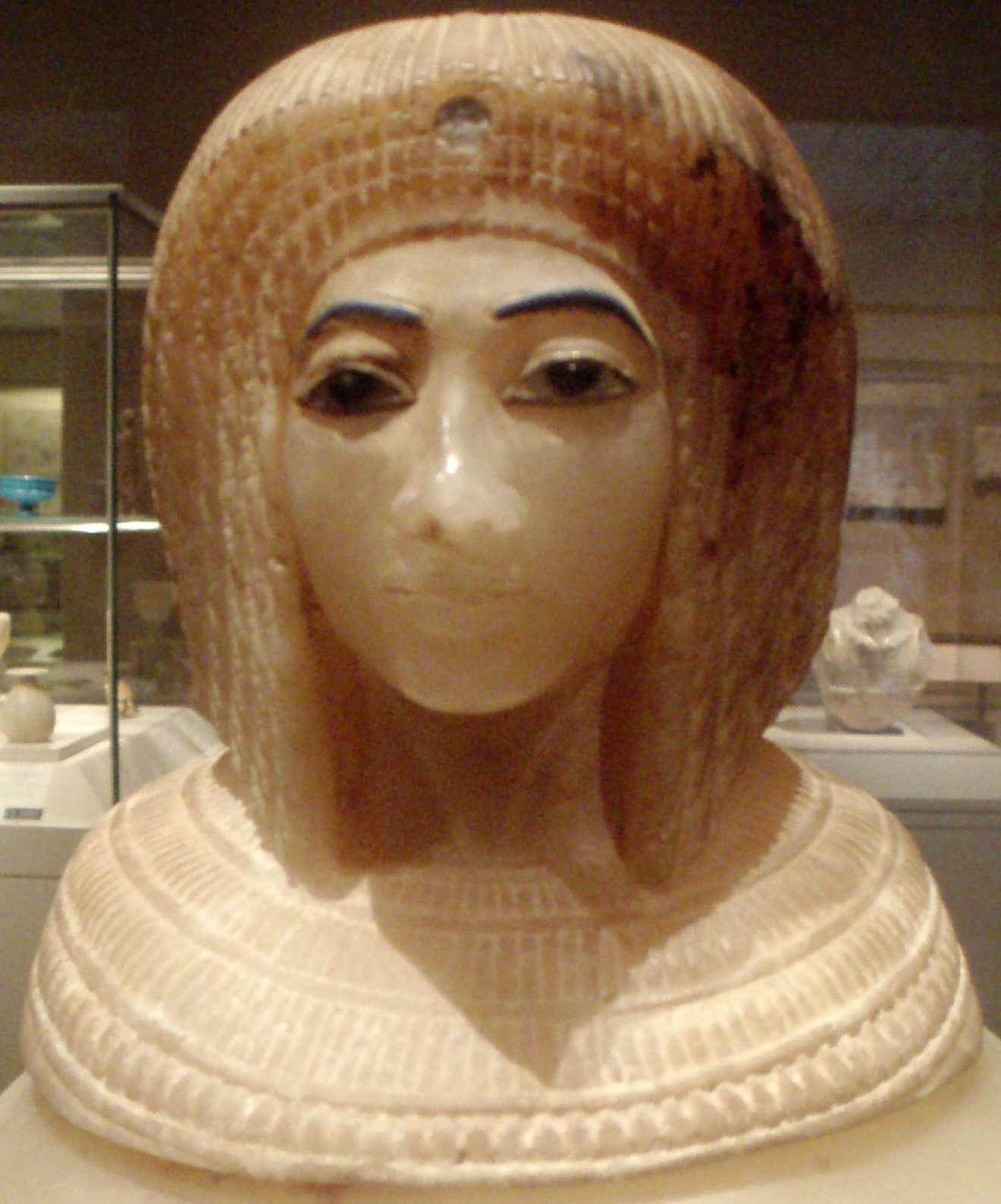
Canopic Jar (07.226.1) with a Lid in the Shape of a Royal Woman's Head (30.8.54); ca.1349–1336 B.C. or shortly thereafter; Travertine (Egyptian alabaster), blue glass, obsidian, unidentified stone; Lid (30.8.54): H. 18.2 cm (7 3/16 in); diam. 16.6 cm (6 9/16 in); The Metropolitan Museum of Art

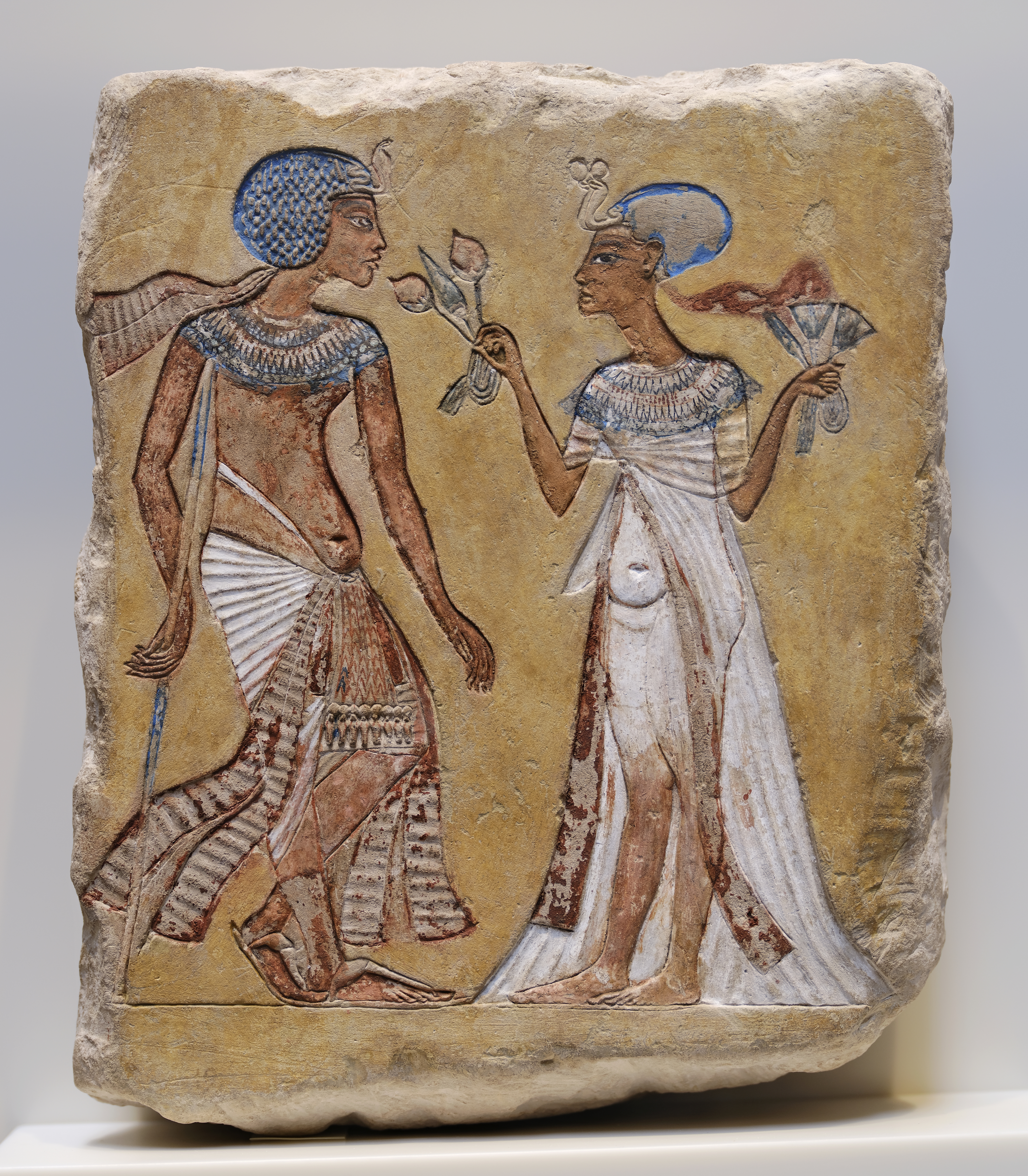
Artist's sketch: Walk in the Garden; limestone; New Kingdom, 18th dynasty, c. 1335 BC. Egyptian Museum Berlin, Inv. no. 15000 (donated by James Simon in 1920).

In Ancient Egyptian society, hair was an embodiment of identity. It could carry religious and erotic significance and portray information about gender, age, and social status. During the New Kingdom, more elaborate hairstyles for men and women, incorporating curls and plaits, began to be favored over the traditional, simple hairstyles of the Old and Middle Kingdoms.

Nubian wigs, which Ancient Egyptians grew fond of during the Amarna period, were meant to mimic the short curly hair that Nubian tribespeople wore. Egyptologists believe that the Nubian wig was adopted by Queen Nefertiti after witnessing the hairstyle being worn by Nubians in the Pharaoh's army. Though there has been a discussion on what qualifies as a Nubian wig, some arguing layered wigs known as "duplex" styles that include curls and plaits may also be Nubian wigs. Still, many refer to this as a Nubian style and not a Nubian wig.

In general, wigs in Ancient Egypt were almost entirely confined to the elite due to their price. Even when wigs were made of inexpensive materials like plant fibers, the sophisticated craftsmanship required to make wigs proved costly.

== Iconography ==
One can see Nubian wigs in the form of reliefs, statues, and paintings. They are a prime factor in determining the gender of figures in Ancient Egyptian art, as royal women exclusively wear them. It is characterized by its short bushy appearance with rows of curls that frame the brow and sides of the face. The feature that requires the most attention is located on the neck. In Nubian wigs, the hair is cut to expose the nape of the neck, which distinguishes it from a similar headdress where the nape of the neck is not exposed, and the hair falls towards the shoulders. Royal men exclusively wear this alternative style and can be seen in the left image titled Walk in the Garden.

== Techniques and composition ==
Wigs were composed of various materials such as human hair, wool, plant fibers, and horsehair. The most expensive wigs were made of human hair or black sheep wool, or both. In addition to the hair, false or human, Ancient Egyptians used beeswax and resin to hold the style in place on a mesh cap.

One wig specifically, titled wig by The British Museum, has been studied extensively. Efforts to study other wigs are scarce due to the fragile nature or incompleteness of the wigs after thousands of years. Though this wig is the "duplex" style that men wore and is referenced above, its condition gives historians insight into how Ancient Egyptians created wigs.

To begin the process of making a wig, a wigmaker must have first collected hair. After a wigmaker collected enough hair, the hair was washed and separated into individual locks with about 400 strands per lock. Construction could then begin on a wooden wig mount very similar to what modern wigmakers would use. The wig achieved the mesh base by laying hair down vertically and horizontally across each other. The base layer was kept in place by knotting and folding the hair back over itself and then was further reinforced by a mixture of two-thirds beeswax and one-third conifer resin. To hook curls to the mesh layer, the curl was looped around the mesh and then fastened by fifteen individual hairs, called a "sub-strand" that was tired around the stem of the curl. Wigs could take up to 200 hours to complete and could take even longer if plaits were styled on the wooden wig mount, as they probably were in ancient times.

== Gallery ==
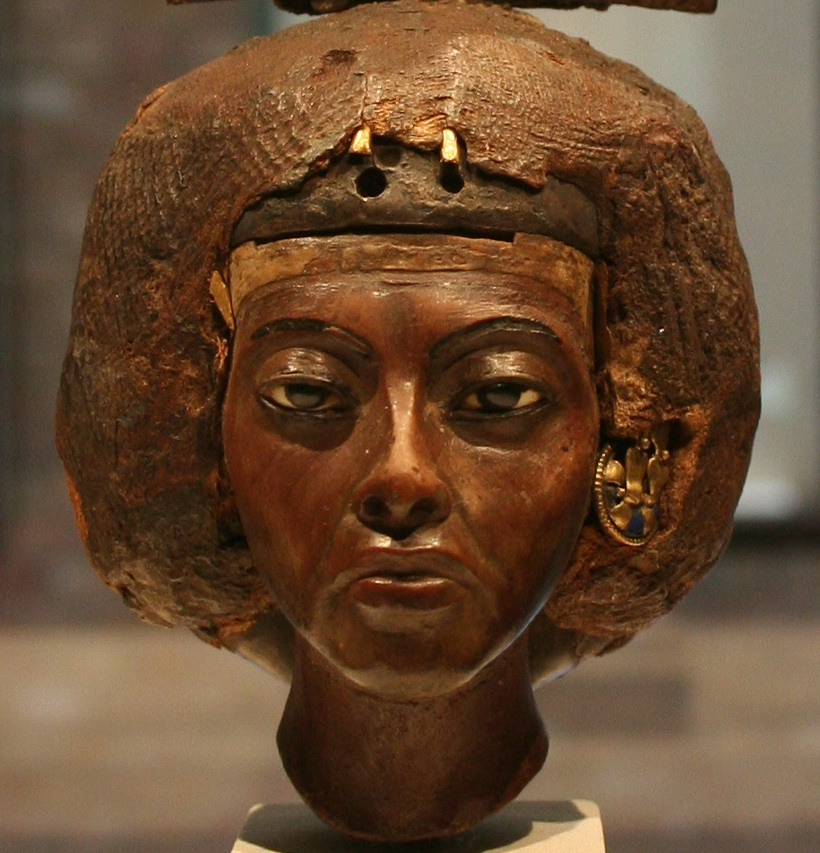
Bust of Tiye, now in the Ägyptisches Museum in Berlin, Germany

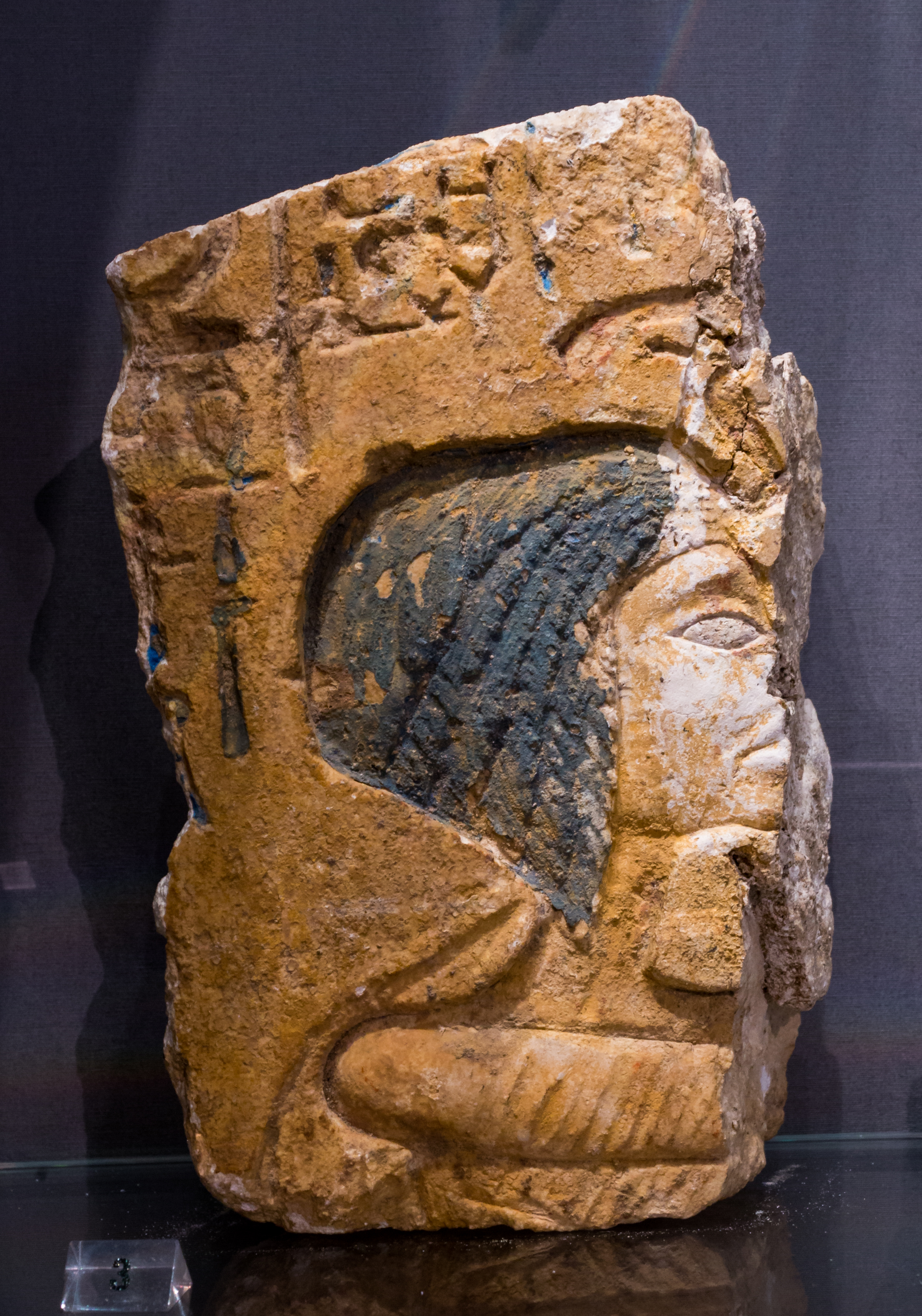
Relief depicting the queen, Nefertiti (E.GA.4530.1943); ca.1352-1336 B.C.; Limestone, Painted; The Fitzwilliam Museum Cambridge

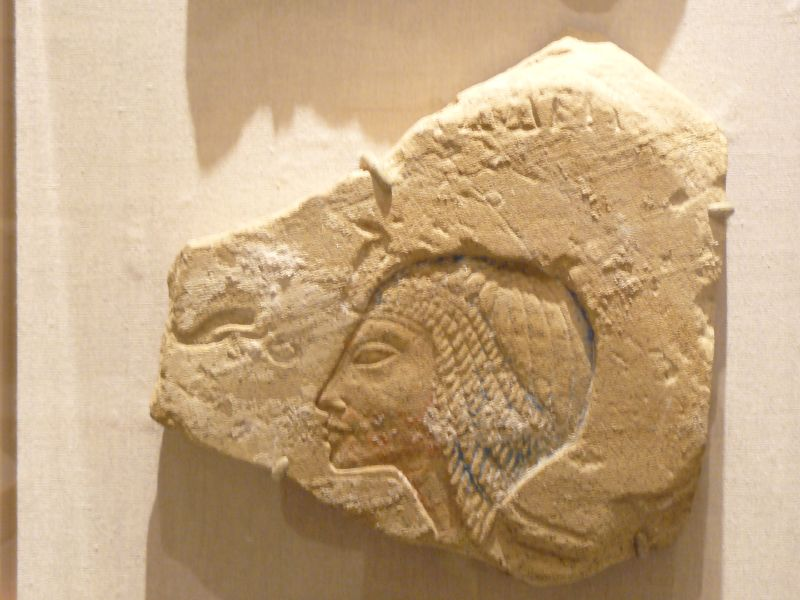
Late Image of Nefertiti (35.1999); Sandstone, pigment; ca.1352-1336 B.C.; 11 9/16 x 3 15/16 x 17 1/8 in. (29.3 x 10 x 43.5 cm); Brooklyn Museum, Gift of the Egypt Exploration Society

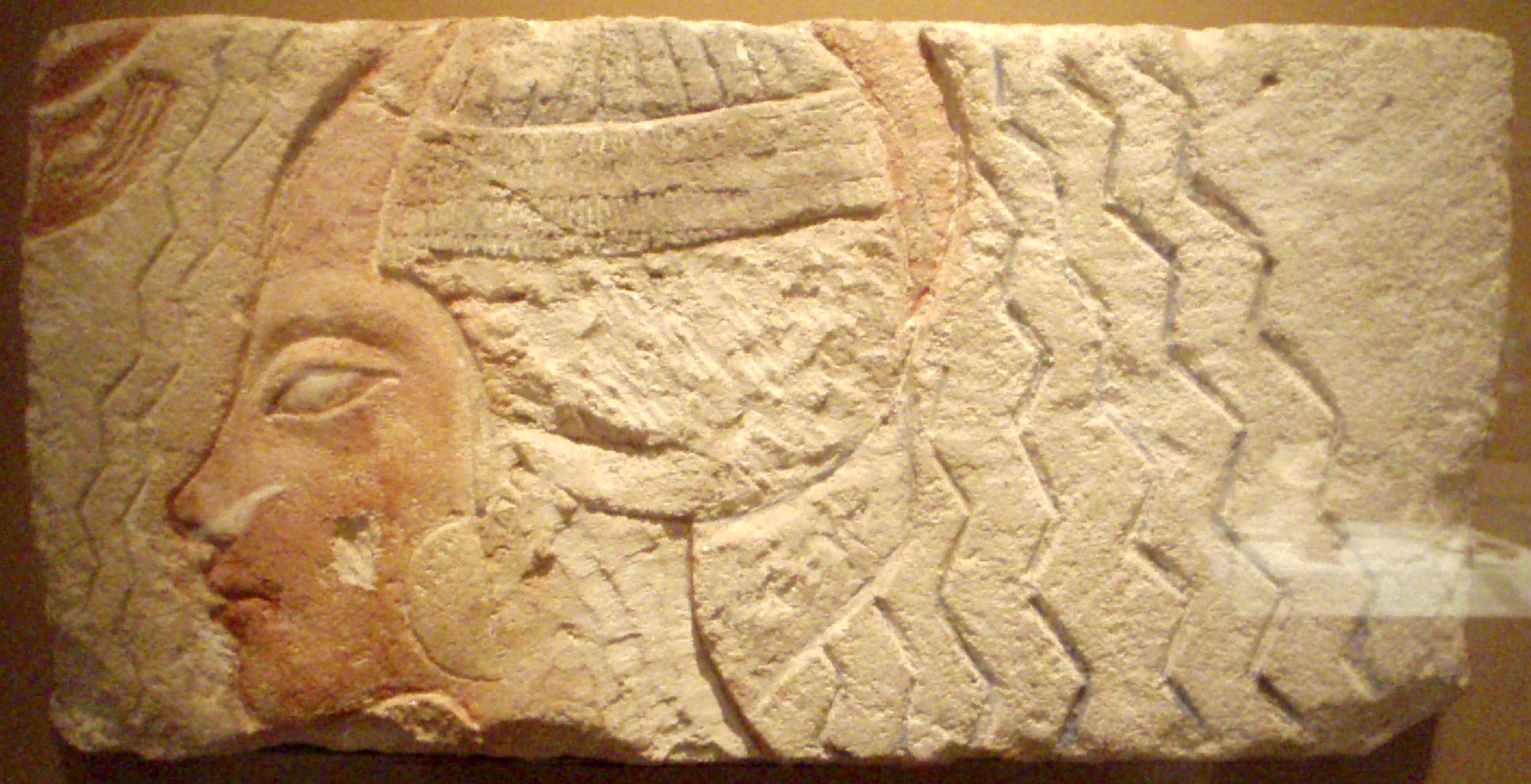
Relief Depicting the Purification of Queen Kiya (?) (1985.328.8); Limestone, paint; ca. 1353–1336 B.C.; H. 22.8 × l. 47 × d. 2.5 cm (9 × 18 1/2 × 1 in.); Metropolitan Museum
