= Afro puffs =

Hairstyle

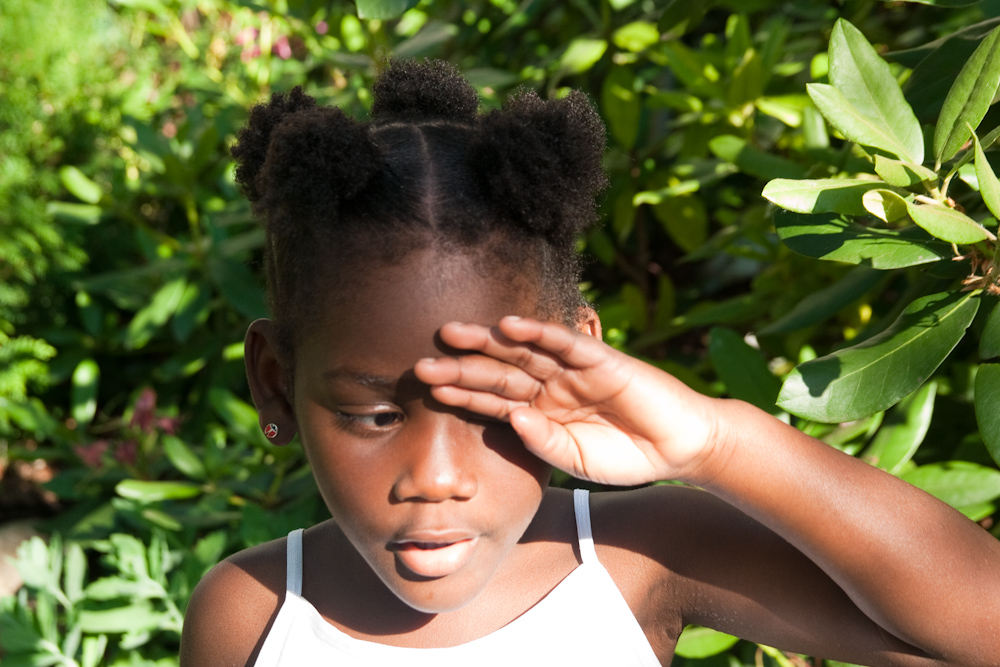
A young girl in afro puffs

Afro puffs are a hair style usually consisting of "puffs" of hair, like smaller versions of an afro, from which it evolved.

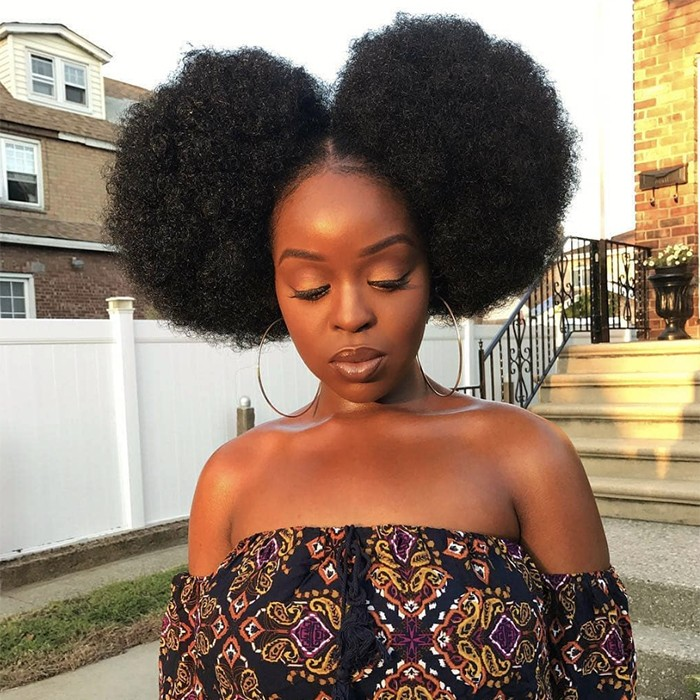
A woman with afro puffs

The style is created by parting the hair down the middle and using a hair tie on each side. Variants include zig-zag partings and multiple puffs.

== In popular culture ==
- The song "Afro Puffs" by The Lady of Rage is named after the hairstyle.
- On Central Park (TV series), the character Molly Tillerman (voiced by Kristen Bell in season one and Emmy Raver-Lampman from season two and onwards) has the hairstyle. Molly also draws herself in comic books as the superhero Fista-Puffs, whose Afro-Puffs are the source of her powers.

== See also ==
- Pigtail
- List of hairstyles
