= Afro =

Hair style

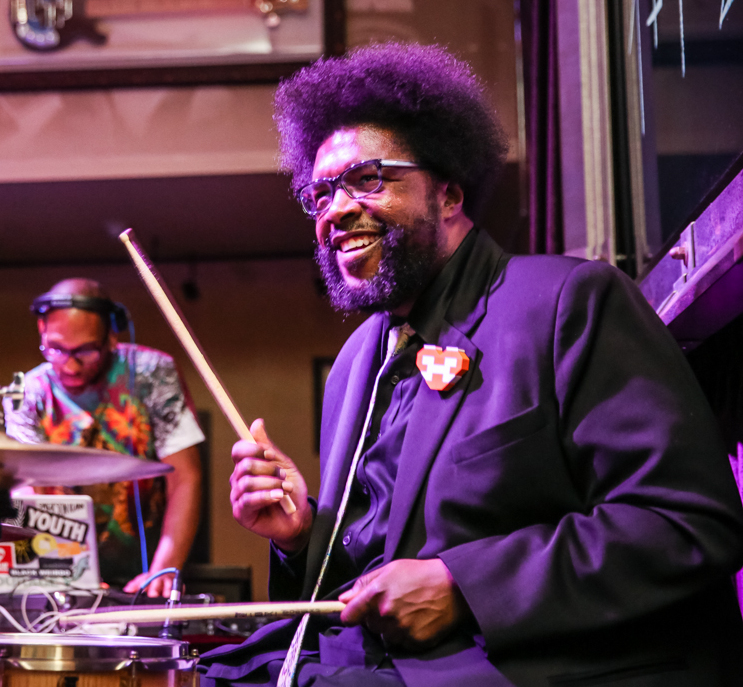
American drummer Questlove with an afro, 2014

The afro is a hair style created by combing out natural growth of kinky hair, or specifically styled with chemical curling products by individuals with naturally curly, wavy, or straight hair. The hairstyle can be created by combing the hair away from the scalp, dispersing a distinctive curl pattern, and forming the hair into a rounded shape, much like a cloud or puff ball.

For people with wavy or straight hair, the hair style is created with the help of permanent hair structure-changing creams or gels and/or other solidifying liquids to temporarily hold the hair in place. Particularly popular in the African American community of the late 1960s and early 1970s, the hairstyle is often shaped and maintained with the assistance of a wide-toothed comb colloquially known as an Afro pick.

== Etymology ==
"Afro" is derived from the term "Afro American". The hairstyle is also referred to by some as a "natural hairstyle". In most cases the hair is left untreated by relaxers or straightening chemicals and is instead allowed to express its natural curl or kinkiness.

== History in the United States ==
=== African-American hairstyles prior to the 1960s ===
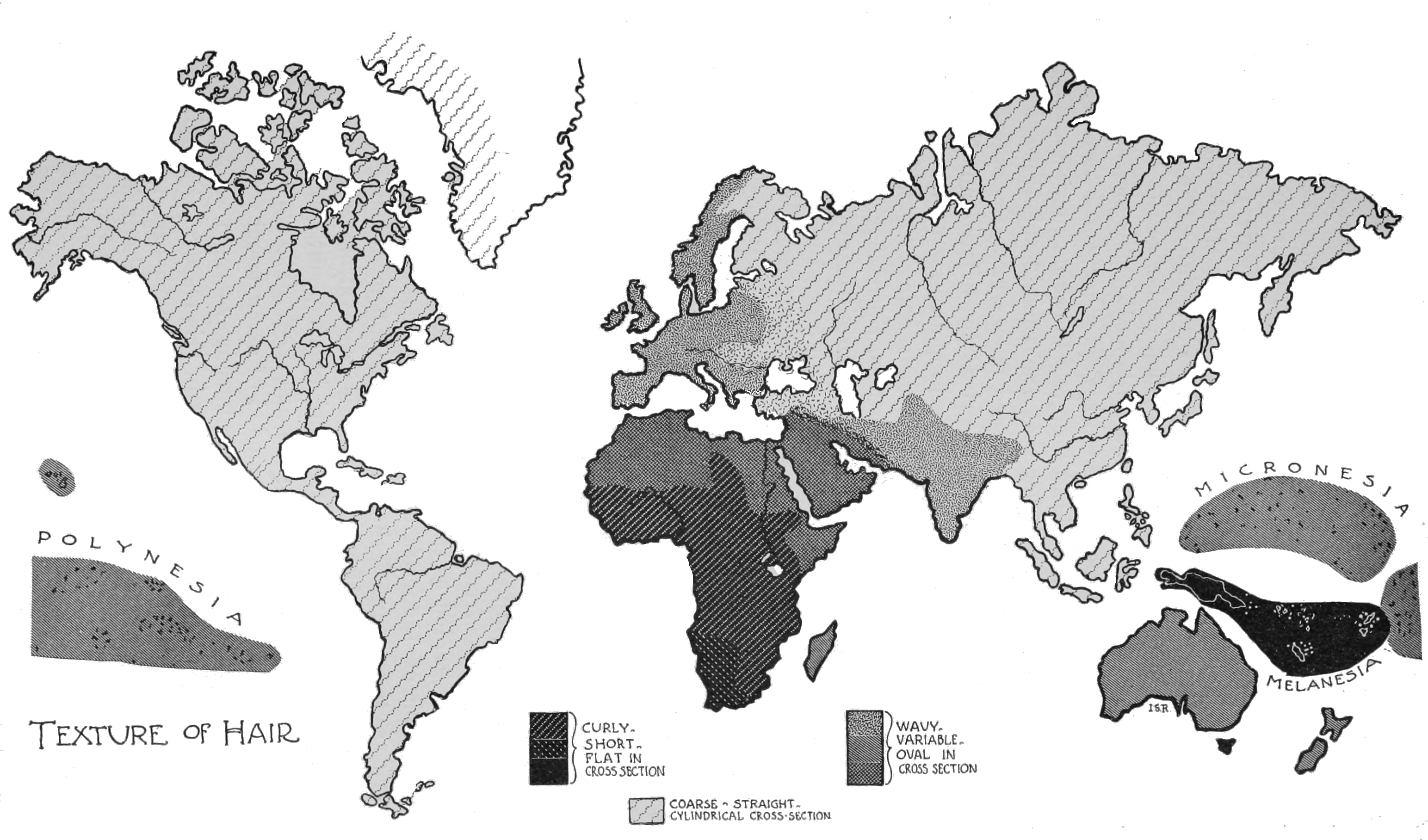
Global hair texture distribution

During the history of slavery in the United States, most African Americans styled their hair in an attempt to mimic the styles of the predominantly white society in which they lived. Afro-textured hair, characterized by its tight kinks, has been described as being kinky, coarse, cottony, nappy, or woolly. These characteristics represented the antithesis of the European American standard of beauty, and led to a negative view of kinky hair. As a result, the practice of straightening gained popularity among African Americans.

The process of straightening the hair often involved applying caustic substances, such as relaxers containing lye, which needed to be applied by an experienced hairstylist so as to avoid burning the scalp and ears. Those who chose not to artificially treat their hair would often opt to style it into tight braids or cornrows. With all of these hairstyling methods, one ran the risk of damaging the hair shaft, sometimes resulting in hair loss.

=== 1960s and 1970s ===
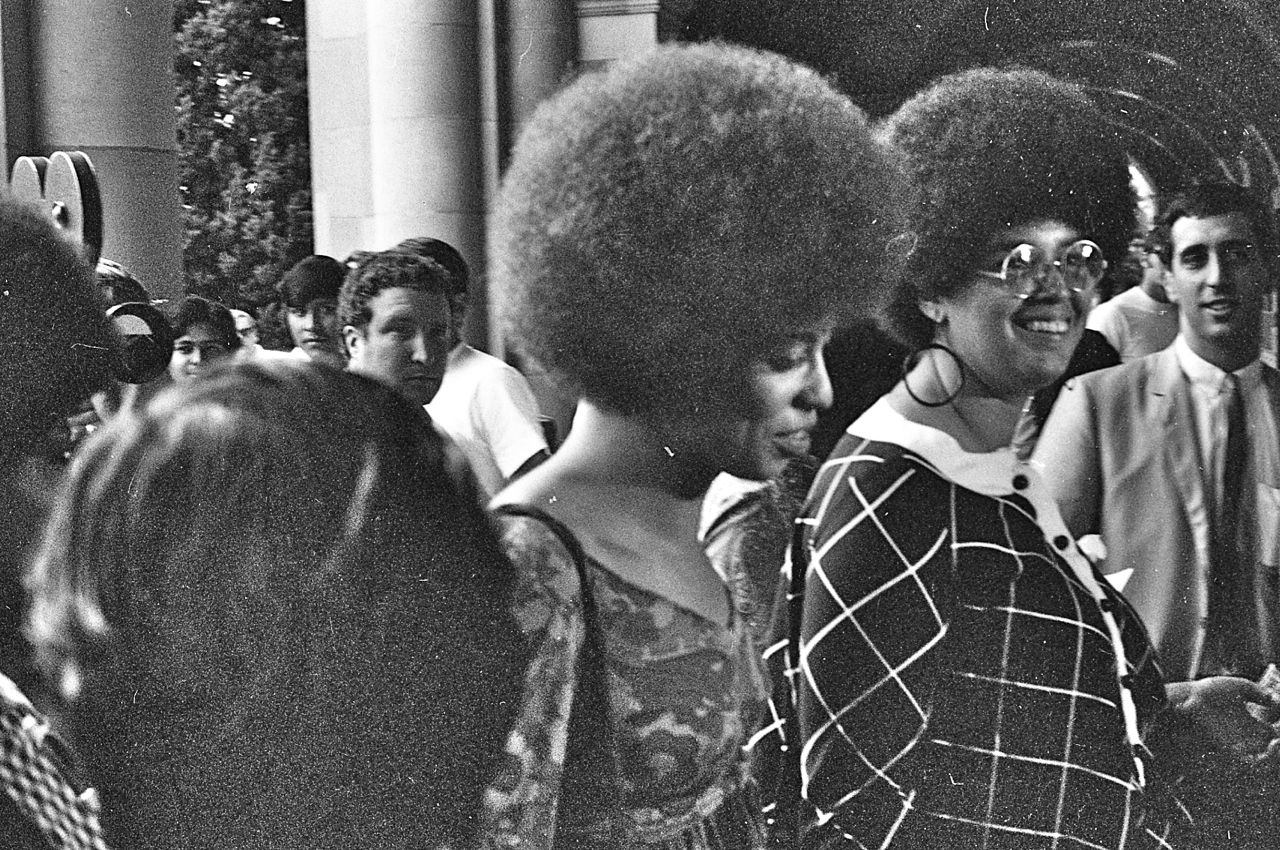
Angela Davis (center, no glasses) enters Royce Hall at UCLA for her first philosophy lecture in October 1969.

The effect of the Civil Rights Movement brought a renewed sense of identity to the African–American community, which also resulted in a redefinition of personal style that included an appreciation of black beauty and aesthetics, as embodied by the "Black is beautiful" movement. This cultural movement marked a return to more natural, untreated hairstyles. The afro became a powerful political symbol which reflected black pride and a rejection of notions of assimilation and integration—not unlike the long and untreated hair sported by the mainly White hippies.

To some African Americans, the afro also represented a reconstitutive link to West Africa and Central Africa. However, some critics have suggested that the afro hairstyle is not particularly African: In his book Welcome to the Jungle: New Positions in Black Cultural Studies, cultural critic Kobena Mercer argued that the contemporary African society of the mid-20th century did not consider either hairstyle to denote any particular "Africanness"; conversely, some Africans felt that these styles signified "First-worldness".

Similarly, Brackette F. Williams stated in her book Stains on My Name, War in My Veins: Guyana and the Politics of Cultural Struggle that African nationalists were irritated by the afro's adoption by African Americans as a symbol of their African heritage; they saw this trend as an example of Western arrogance. Sly Stone wore his long hair in the Afro style in May 1971.

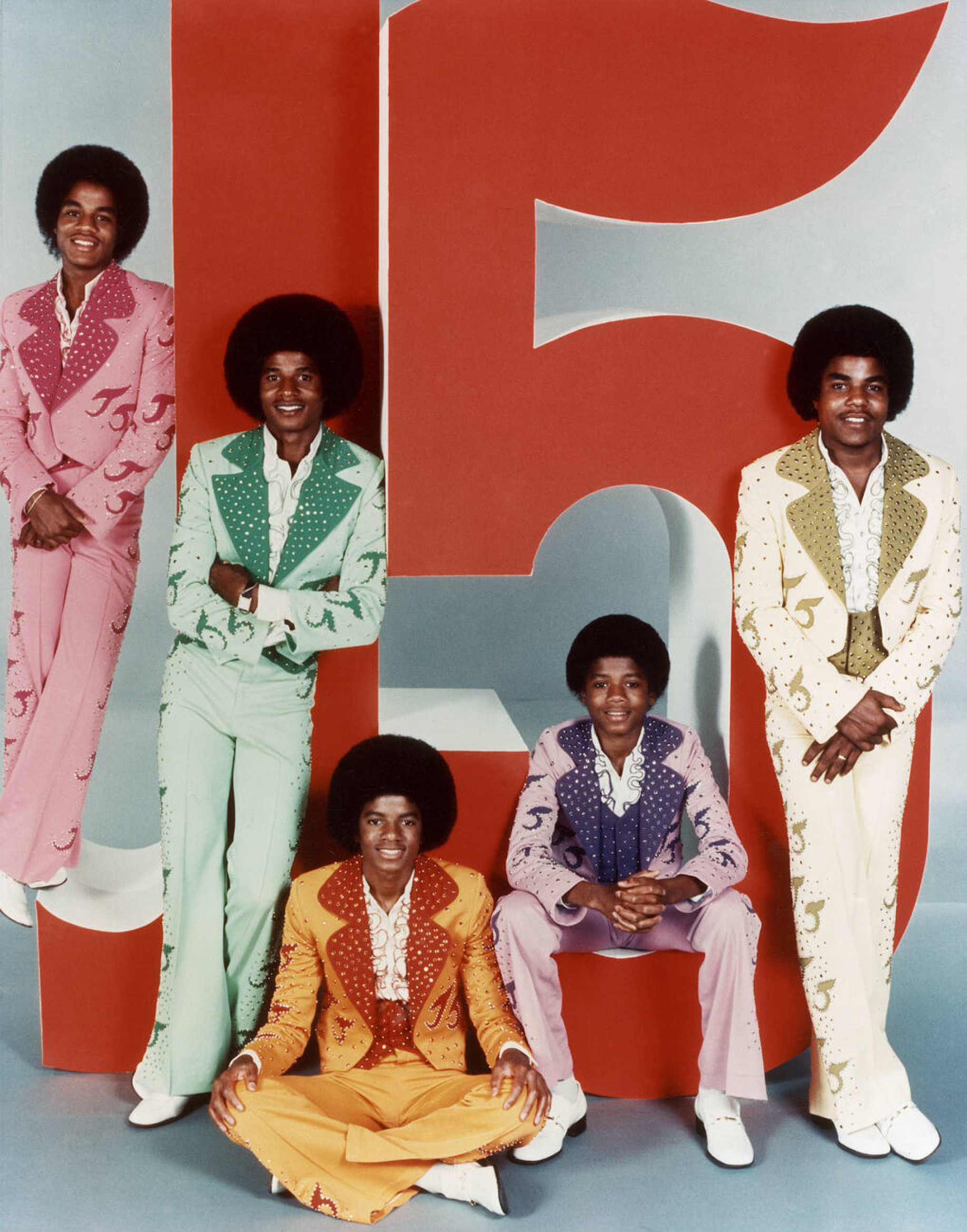
The Jackson 5 sporting afros in 1976

The afro was adopted by both men and women and was a hairstyle that was easier to maintain by oneself, without requiring frequent and sometimes costly visits to the hairstylist as was often experienced by people who chose to braid, straighten or relax their hair. Due to the kinky pattern prominent in Afro-textured hair, as it grows longer it has a tendency to extend outward from the head, resulting in a domelike hairstyle which is easily molded and sculpted into the desired shape. While the afro was a much less invasive and time-consuming hairstyle choice for many African Americans, some chose to achieve a more voluminous version of the afro by backcombing or teasing the hair, a practice that can result in damage to the hair and scalp.

In the mid-1960s, the afro hairstyle began in a fairly tightly coiffed form, such as the hairstyle that became popular among members of the Black Panther Party. As the 1960s progressed towards the 1970s, popular hairstyles, both within and outside of the African-American community, became longer and longer. As a result, the late 1960s/early 1970s saw an expansion in the overall size of afros. Some of the entertainers and sociopolitical figures of the time known for wearing larger afros include political activist Angela Davis, actress Pam Grier, rock musician Jimi Hendrix, singer Miriam Makeba, and the members of the musical groups the Jackson 5 and the Supremes.

In contrast, the afro's popularity among African Americans had already started to wane by the early 1970s; the introduction of the hairstyle to the mainstream and its adoption by people of non-African descent caused the afro to lose its radical, political edge. The 1970s saw an increase in the popularity of braided hairstyles such as cornrows among both sexes of African Americans.

=== 1990s–present ===
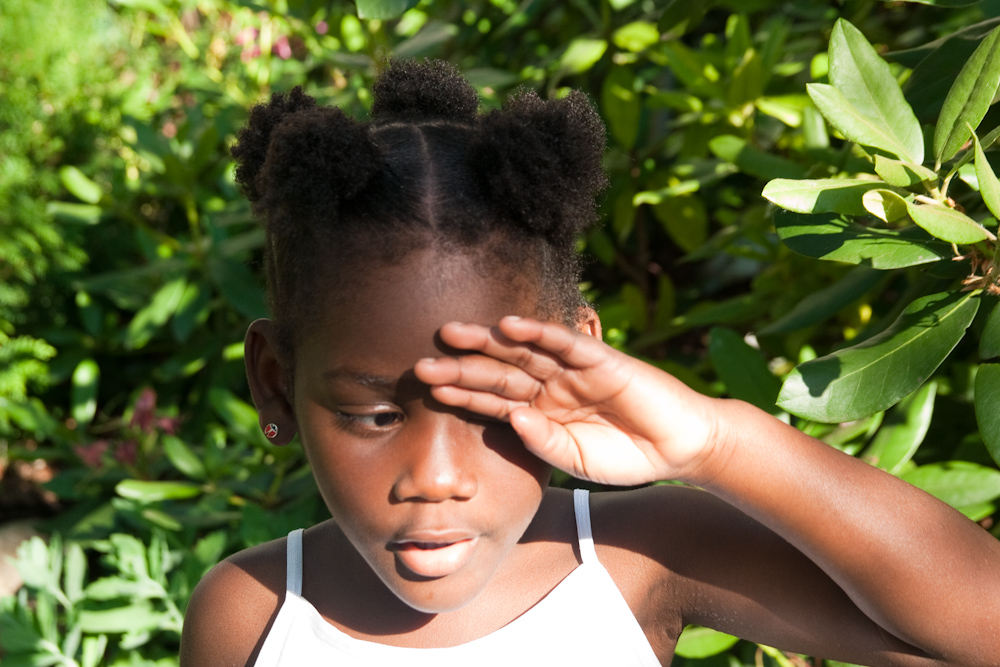
A young girl wearing a hairstyle of several sections of hair bound with elastics, a style called afro puffs

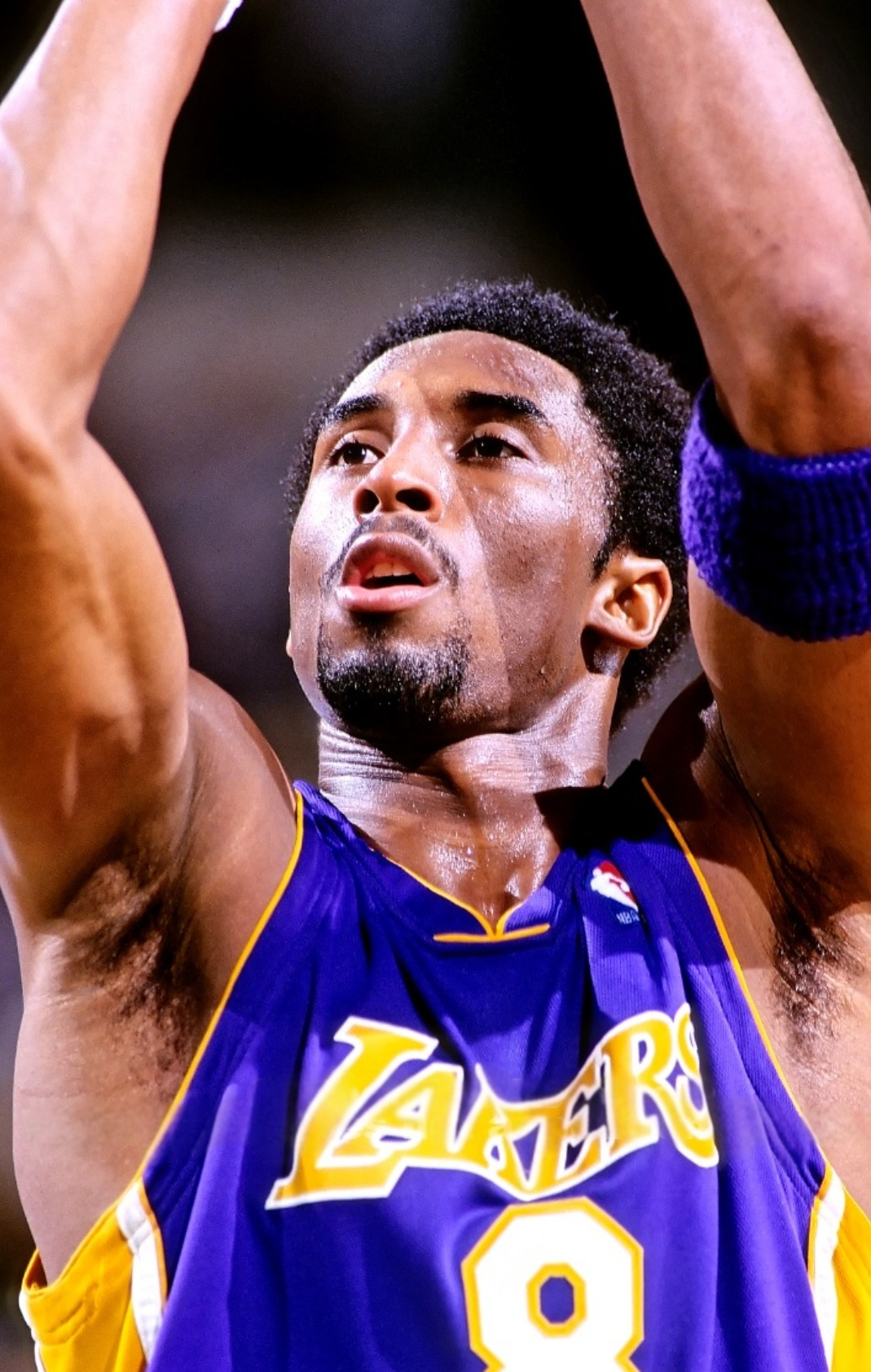
Nicknamed 'Frobe' for his early-career afro hairstyle, Los Angeles Lakers Hall of Famer Kobe Bryant in 1999

The afro saw some resurgence in both the 1990s and the 2000s. These afros would take varied forms, some incorporating elements such as braids, beads or twists, as well as various sizes, from close-cropped natural hairstyles all the way to expansive afro wigs.

Some African Americans who have been known for wearing afros or afro wigs during these two decades include NBA basketball players Ben Wallace, Kobe Bryant, and Michael Beasley, as well as musicians Lauryn Hill, Erykah Badu, Macy Gray, Ludacris, Questlove, Cindy Blackman, Wiz Khalifa, and Lenny Kravitz. Beyoncé also donned a large afro wig for her role as Foxxy Cleopatra in the 2002 film Austin Powers in Goldmember.

On July 3, 2019, California became the first U.S. state to prohibit discrimination over natural hair. Governor Gavin Newsom signed the CROWN Act into law, banning employers and schools from discriminating against hairstyles such as afros, braids, twists, and dreadlocks. Likewise, later in 2019 Assembly Bill 07797 became law in New York state; it "prohibits race discrimination based on natural hair or hairstyles."

Aevin Dugas from Gonzales, Louisiana, USA, set a new Guinness World Record on 11 September 2022, for the largest female afro, which measures 165 cm (5.41 ft) in circumference, 25 cm (9.84 in) in height, and 26 cm (10.24 in) in width. She has broken the Guinness World Record for the largest afro three times, including in 2010 and 2021. Dugas says she began growing her afro in 1999 and learned how to style and cut it herself after an unsuccessful trip to a professional hairstylist. She states that she broke the record to personally advocate for the beauty of natural hair and to encourage self-love.

== Similar styles internationally ==
A young man sporting a 'Jewfro'

A "Jewfro" (portmanteau of the words Jew and afro) or (rarely) "Isfro" (portmanteau of the words Israel and afro) refers to an afro when worn by some Jewish people. The term has its roots in the 1960s and 1970s when many prominent figures were described as sporting the hairstyle. In 1970, the Los Angeles Times called college football star Scott Marcus a flower child with "golden brown hair ... in ringlets around his head in what he calls a Jewish afro style". The New York Times, in a 1971 article on Harvard University's "hairy" basketball team, wrote that Captain Brian Newmark "hasn't had a haircut since last May, and his friends have suggested his hairdo is a first cousin to the Afro, the style that is popular with blacks. In the case of the Jewish junior from Brooklyn, though, the bushy dark hair that is piled high on his head has been called an 'Isro'." Novelist Judith Rossner was described in a Chicago Tribune profile as the "grown-up Wunderkind with an open, oval face framed by a Jewish Afro."

The Hadendoa Beja of northeastern Africa were nicknamed "Fuzzy-Wuzzies" by British troops during the Mahdist War due to their large and mop-like hairstyles, which they shaped by applying butter or mutton fat. In Somalia, some young men of the nomadic and sedentary communities would grow their hair long and carefully comb it into rather large bushes, which they would then hold in place with ghee. This elaborate hairstyle was quite distinct from another coiffure found among other Somalis, who would instead grow long and fluff out their fine, straight hair and place a chewing stick and comb in the center.

Variations of the afro have been worn by one or both sexes in the many disparate cultures of the African continent. Due to the hairstyle's links to members of the civil rights and Black Power movements, the afro was seen by several outside cultures as a dangerous symbol of political unrest, including Tanzania where the Afro was banned in the 1970s because it was seen as a symbol of neocolonialism and as part of a "cultural invasion" from the United States. In the 1950s and 1960s, South African women were also known to wear their hair in an afro-type style.

The afro did not rise to the same level of popularity among the Afro-Caribbean community as it did in the United States, in part because of the popularity of dreadlocks, which played an important role in the Rastafari movement. Not unlike the afro's significance among the members of the American Black Power movement, dreadlocks symbolized black pride and empowerment among the Rastafari of the Caribbean.

== Tools ==
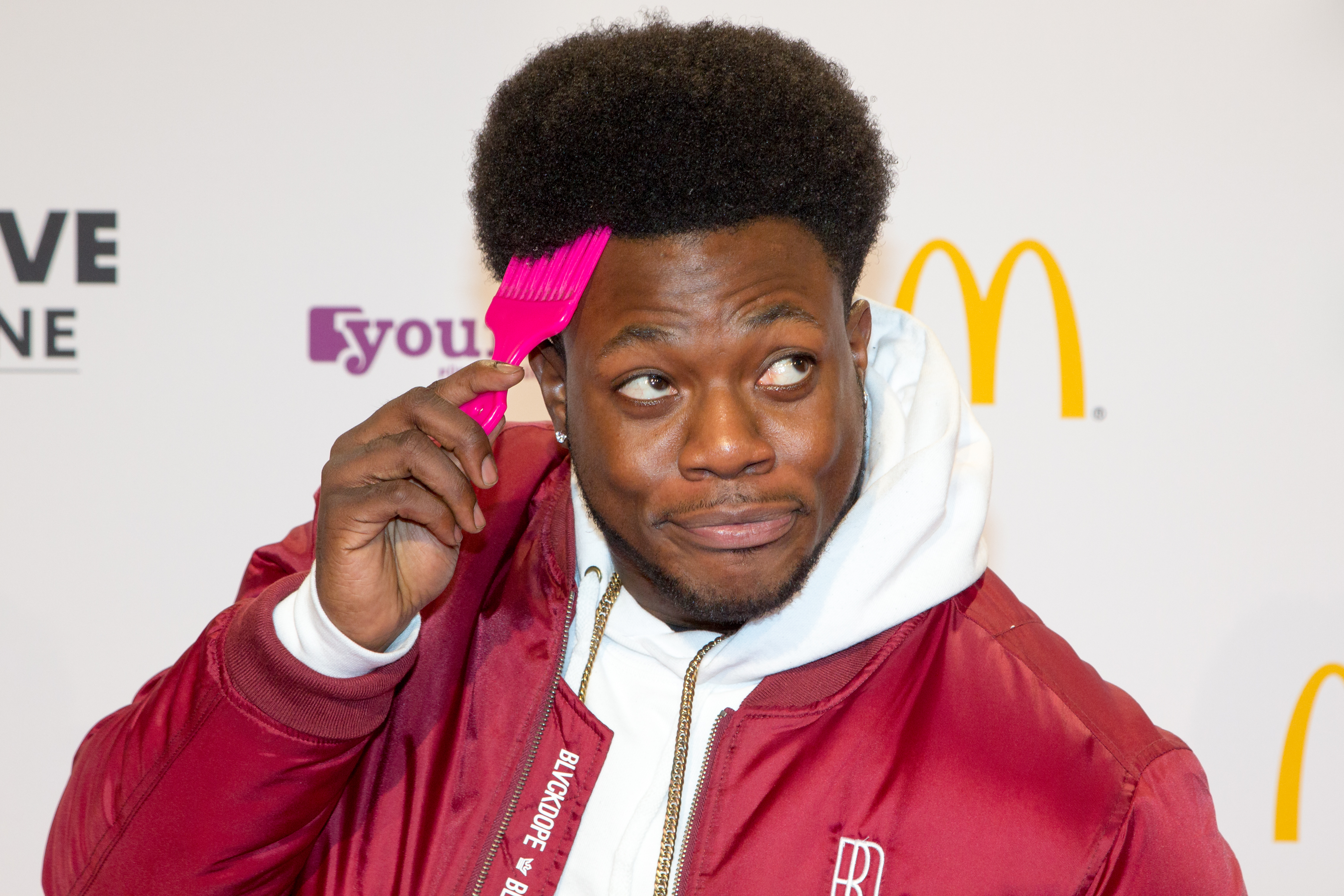
Hair pick in use

The long, wide teeth of the "afro pick" or afro comb were designed to dig down to the scalp, allowing the hair to be stretched out from the roots into a desired style or shape using a picking motion.

== See also ==
- Big hair
- Conk
- Jheri curl
- Natural hair movement
- Nubian wig
- List of hairstyles
