= Discrimination based on hair texture in the United States =

Form of prejudice in the United States

In the United States, discrimination based on hair texture is a form of social injustice that has been predominantly experienced by African Americans and predates the founding of the country.

In the 21st century, multiple states and local governments have passed laws that prohibit such discrimination. California was the first state to do so in 2019 with the CROWN (Create a Respectful and Open Workplace for Natural Hair) Act (SB 188). As of December 2025, twenty-seven states have passed similar legislation and two others have enacted executive orders, but there is no equivalent law at the federal level. A federal CROWN act was proposed in 2020, and was passed by the House of Representatives but not the Senate. Another bill was introduced in the House of Representatives in 2021; it was approved by the House in 2022, and did not received consideration in the Senate.

== History ==
In the late 18th century, free Africans in New Orleans were able to buy their freedom from slavery, resulting in an increase of interracial marriage in Louisiana. In response, Charles III of Spain demanded Louisiana colonial governor Esteban Rodríguez Miró to "'establish public order and proper standards of morality,' with specific reference to a "large class" of "mulattos" and particularly "mulatto" women.'" Louisiana women of African descent wore hairstyles that incorporated feathers and jewels, which caught the attention of white men. To comply with Charles III's demand, Miró issued an edict that required Creole women to wear a tignon to conceal their hair.

By the late 1800s, African American women were straightening their hair to meet a Eurocentric vision of society with the use of hot combs and other products.

=== 1900-present ===
Starting in the 1900s, hot combs and oils for hair straightening were improved and commercialized by businesswomen such as Madam C. J. Walker and Annie Turnbo Malone.

However, the black pride movement of the 1960s and 1970s made the afro a popular hairstyle among African Americans and considered a symbol of resistance. In 1964, the U.S. federal government passed the Civil Rights Act, which prohibited employment discrimination based on race, but it was left to interpretation by the courts as to what this constituted. In 1970, Beverly Jenkins was denied a promotion in the Blue Cross by her white supervisor due to her afro. In 1976, the federal court case Jenkins v. Blue Cross Mutual Hospital Insurance determined that afros were protected by Title VII of the Civil Rights Act of 1964. However, the case did not extend protections against hair discrimination.

In the 2010s, natural hairstyles saw an increase in popularity in response to celebrities such as Viola Davis, Lupita Nyong'o, Ava DuVernay, and Stacey Abrams wearing natural hair. However, the popularity also resulted in increased attention to dress codes and hair regulations as African American workers and students across the U.S. were subjected to punishment due to their hair. Because of awareness to the issue, California passed the Crown Act in July 2019, becoming the first U.S. state to prohibit discrimination against workers and students based on their natural hair. California's passage of the bill has led many other states to consider similar bills banning hair discrimination and a bill proposed at the federal level by U.S. representative Cedric Richmond and U.S. senator Cory Booker.

In September 2020, U.S. representative Ilhan Omar announced the passage of the Crown Act in the House of Representatives, which would prohibit racialized hair discrimination nationally if enacted.

== Legislation ==
As of December 2025, 27 out of 50 U.S. states and Puerto Rico have prohibited discrimination based on hair texture.

Passed law that prohibits discrimination based on hair texture Legislation only applies to workplace discrimination based on hair style or texture Legislation only applies to students in schools At least one legislative chamber has passed similar legislation

State	Date enacted	Notes
California	July 3, 2019	Passed the Crown Act
New York	July 12, 2019	Passed an amendment to the New York Human Rights Law
New Jersey	December 19, 2019	Passed the Crown Act
Virginia	March 3, 2020	Passed the Virginia Human Rights Act
Colorado	March 6, 2020	Passed the Crown Act
Washington	March 19, 2020	Passed an amendment to the Washington State Law Against Discrimination
Maryland	May 8, 2020	Passed without governor's signature
Connecticut	March 4, 2021	Passed the Crown Act
New Mexico	April 5, 2021	Passed the Crown Act
Delaware	April 13, 2021	Passed the Crown Act
Nebraska	May 5, 2021	Passed the Crown Act
Nevada	June 4, 2021	Passed the Crown Act
Oregon	June 11, 2021	Passed the Crown Act
Illinois	August 13, 2021	Passed Jett Hawkins Act
Maine	May 3, 2022	Passed the Crown Act
Tennessee	May 27, 2022	Passed the Crown Act; only applies to workplace discrimination
Louisiana	June 21, 2022	Passed the Crown Act
Massachusetts	July 26, 2022	Passed the Crown Act
Alaska	September 8, 2022	Passed "An Act relating to dress codes and natural hairstyles"; only applies to educational discrimination in schools.
Minnesota	February 1, 2023	Passed the CROWN Act
Arkansas	April 10, 2023	Passed the CROWN Act; only applies to educational discrimination in public schools and state-supported higher education institutions.
Texas	May 29, 2023	Passed the CROWN Act
Michigan	June 15, 2023	Passed the CROWN Act, amending the Elliott-Larsen Civil Rights Act
Vermont	July 1, 2024	Legislation implemented and signed by the Governor to ban hair style discrimination
Puerto Rico	July 24, 2024	Legislation implemented and signed by the Governor to ban hair style discrimination
New Hampshire	September 1, 2024	Legislation implemented and signed by the Governor to ban hair style discrimination
Pennsylvania	November 25, 2025	Passed the CROWN Act
Missouri	July 9, 2025	Passed the CROWN Act; only applies to educational discrimination in public schools and state-supported higher education institutions.

=== Illinois ===
In May 2024, the Illinois Legislature passed an HB 5097 to expand the Jett Hawkins Act to explicitly protect and extend hairstyle protections within childcare, juvenile detention facilities, youth in care and/or within foster and adopted families - the first US state to do so broadly. The Governor JB Pritzker signed the bill on August 9, 2024. Another bill, SB 3611 (Religious Hair and Facial Hair Protections Act), which would expand the Jett Hawkins Act to include hairstyles and facial hair in public schools specific to Orthodox Jewish faith and tradition in public or ISBE-registered schools, was passed by the Legislature on May 21, 2026, and awaits signature.

=== Executive orders ===
An executive order prohibiting discrimination by Arizona state agencies and contractors was signed by Governor Katie Hobbs on March 17, 2023. Kentucky governor Andy Beshear signed a similar executive order on May 24, 2024. Attorney General for the District of Columbia Brian Schwalb issued an interpretation of the DC Human Rights Act in 2019, extending it to apply to hair style and texture discrimination.

=== Pending similar hair bills ===
In addition, similar legislation has been introduced in Florida, Georgia, Kansas, Kentucky, Mississippi, Missouri, North Carolina, Ohio, Rhode Island, South Carolina, Utah, and Wisconsin.

=== Ordinances ===
- Arizona
  - Tempe
  - Tucson
- Georgia
  - Clayton County
  - Mableton
- Kentucky
  - Covington
  - Frankfort
  - Lexington
  - Louisville
- North Carolina
  - Durham
  - Raleigh
- Ohio
  - Akron
  - Cincinnati
  - Cuyahoga County
  - Toledo
- Wisconsin
  - Dane County
  - Milwaukee

== See also ==
- Hair texturism
- Human hair color
- African-American hair
- Facial hair in the military#United States
