= Rogers v. American Airlines (1981) =

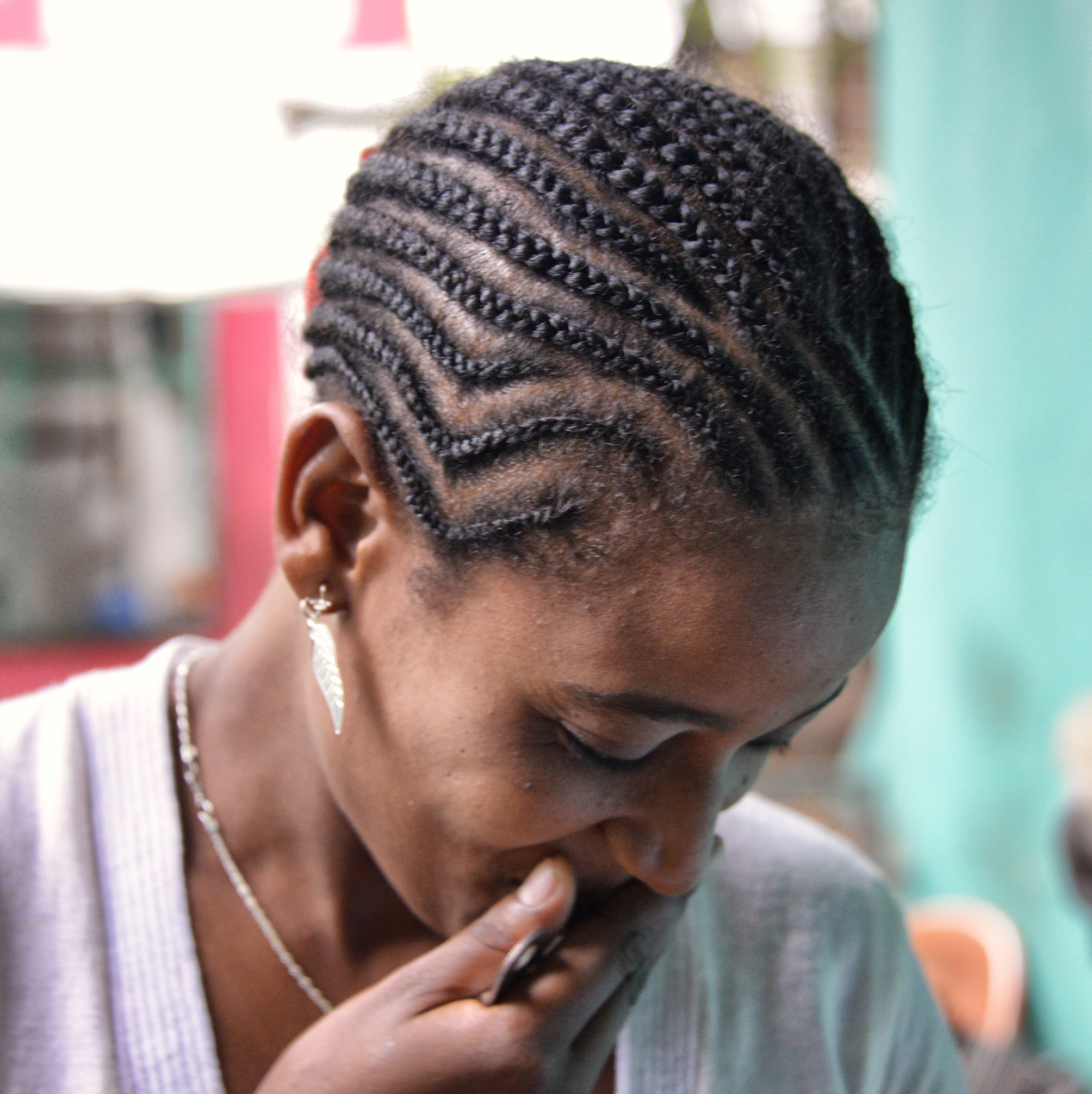
Braided hairstyles, such as cornrows, were at the center of Rogers v. American Airlines' legal discourse.

Rogers v. American Airlines was a 1981 legal case decided by the United States District Court for the Southern District of New York involving plaintiff Renee Rogers, a Black woman who brought charges against her employer, American Airlines, for both sex and racial discrimination after she was dissuaded from wearing her hair in cornrows due to the airline's employee grooming policy. Rogers believed that this hair policy was a violation of her Title VII rights.

== Background ==
Title VII of the Civil Rights Act of 1964 prohibits employment discrimination on the basis of race, color, religion, sex, or national origin. Title VII as it stands does not provide explicit protection for Black women's protective or non-afro hairstyles, including cornrows. However, regardless of an individual's hair texture (curly, straight, coiled, wavy, etc.), natural or otherwise unchangeable hair has been considered by some courts to fall under Title VII protections.

In 1981, American Airlines had policies in place that banned female employees from wearing braided hairstyles. This was permitted under Title VII. It has been previously ruled in court that "Black women may change their hair texture to make it straight, wear a weave, or wear a wig. However, every other hairstyle involving Black women's natural texture (outside the afro) may be banned."

Renee Rogers was working with American Airlines as an airport operations agent. She claimed that braided hair was culturally important to herself and to other Black women. She sued the airline for sexism and racism, citing Title VII in her argument.

== Decision ==
The court ruled that American Airlines' policy did not violate Rogers' Thirteenth Amendment rights. The court found that there was no legal violation based on sex, because American Airlines had policies in place for both men and women. Even though the policies were different, American Airlines claimed that it was because different types of styles are worn by men and women. The court also ruled that the policy didn't violate the Thirteenth Amendment on the basis of race, because the policy was "race neutral."

American Airlines claimed that the braids Rogers was wearing were popularized by Bo Derek's character in the movie 10. Rogers claimed that the braids she was wearing had historical significance to Black women. The court sided with American Airlines, rejecting the idea of Rogers' braids being culturally significant. The court concluded that the American Airlines grooming policy, specifically the prohibition of braids, had a negligible effect on employment, because Rogers' hairstyle isn't an immutable characteristic, meaning that it can be easily changed.

== Public response ==
=== Intersectional critique of the Civil Rights Act: Title VII ===
Some critics have used Rogers v. American Airlines as a case study to critique the limitations of Title VII for Black women in the workplace. According to the S.D.N.Y., Rogers did not experience discrimination because her protective cornrow hairstyle was considered feasibly changeable. Despite the court's stance, intersectional scholars like Michelle L. Turner and Nia A. D. Langley critiqued this and other logics used by the Rogers court.

The court concluded that American Airlines' grooming policy was not discriminatory because it had a neutral impact across all employee identities, including both race and sex. Turner opposed this reasoning. She said grooming policies fundamentally reflect societal beauty standards, and she argued those standards catered to white, male individuals in the United States due to their high concentration in corporate positions of power. Thus, Turner said, these purportedly neutral policies of American Airlines' actually made white grooming practices the standard for workplace expectations, putting other racial groups and genders at an inherent disadvantage in terms of policy compliance.

Additionally, Turner reasoned that braided hairstyles, such as Rogers' cornrows, are indeed culturally tied to Black women in particular. She referenced the desire for some Black women to reject the notion that "white" hairstyles are the epitome of female beauty and turn instead to braids or other protective styles seen within cultures in the African diaspora. Turner also argued Black men have been granted the right to wear afro styles, while Black women have not had similar initial success with their pro-braid legal arguments.

As for the court's conclusion that Rogers could have easily changed her hair to comply with the policy, Turner's argument did note the somatic ease of such a change. However, she then stated that Rogers changing her hair would be an assimilation to whiteness at the specific expense of culturally meaningful Black female hair practices.

In Langley's intersectional analysis of the case, she noted how hair care can be a source of anxiety for Black women; Black female hair care entails a unique combination of monetary investment and time. The frequency of hair salon visits and the money spent on hair products are both more likely to be higher for Black women than their white counterparts.

Langley additionally pointed to an Equal Employment Opportunity Commission argument from EEOC v. Catastrophe Mgmt. Sols. that states banning hairstyles like Rogers' causes Black women to utilize chemical relaxers and other methods of hair straightening. This subjects such women to both emotional and financial costs. The EEOC also argued that the idea of protecting only immutable physical traits frames race as a biological state of being, not the product of a social construction.

=== The CROWN Act ===
In 2019, California was the first state to pass the CROWN (Create a Respectful and Open Workplace for Natural Hair) Act in the United States, which outlaws hair discrimination on the basis of both race-based hair textures and hairstyles. Subsequently, over a dozen other states either passed the CROWN Act as well or passed legislation similar to the CROWN Act.

The United States House of Representatives passed the CROWN Act (H.R. 2116) on March 18, 2022. Section 2 of the bill's text states that "some Federal courts have misinterpreted Federal civil rights law by narrowly interpreting the meaning of race or national origin, and thereby permitting, for example, employers to discriminate against people of African descent who wear natural or protective hairstyles even though the employment policies involved are not related to workers' ability to perform their jobs."

Sections 3, 4, 5, 6 and 7 (the CROWN Act's applications to federally assisted programs, housing programs, public accommodations, employment and equal rights under the law, respectively) state that on the federal level, discrimination against a hair texture or style would be prohibited if "that hair texture or that hairstyle is commonly associated with a particular race or national origin (including a hairstyle in which hair is tightly coiled or tightly curled, locs, cornrows, twists, braids, Bantu knots, and Afros)."

Proponents of the CROWN Act, including scholar Margaret Goodman, argue that this measure will flesh out the United States' legal protections against hair discrimination for people whose mutable hairstyles nevertheless intersect with their race. On the federal level, CROWN Act opponents included all but 14 House Republicans who voted against the legislation in March 2022, with some characterizing it as unnecessary. The bill subsequently failed to pass the Senate.

== See also ==
- Civil Rights Act of 1964
