= Crown act =

The Crown act may refer to:

- the CROWN Act of 2022
- the CROWN Act (California) of 2019
- Crown act of state, a doctrine of UK constitutional law
