= African-American hair =

Kinky and curly hair types

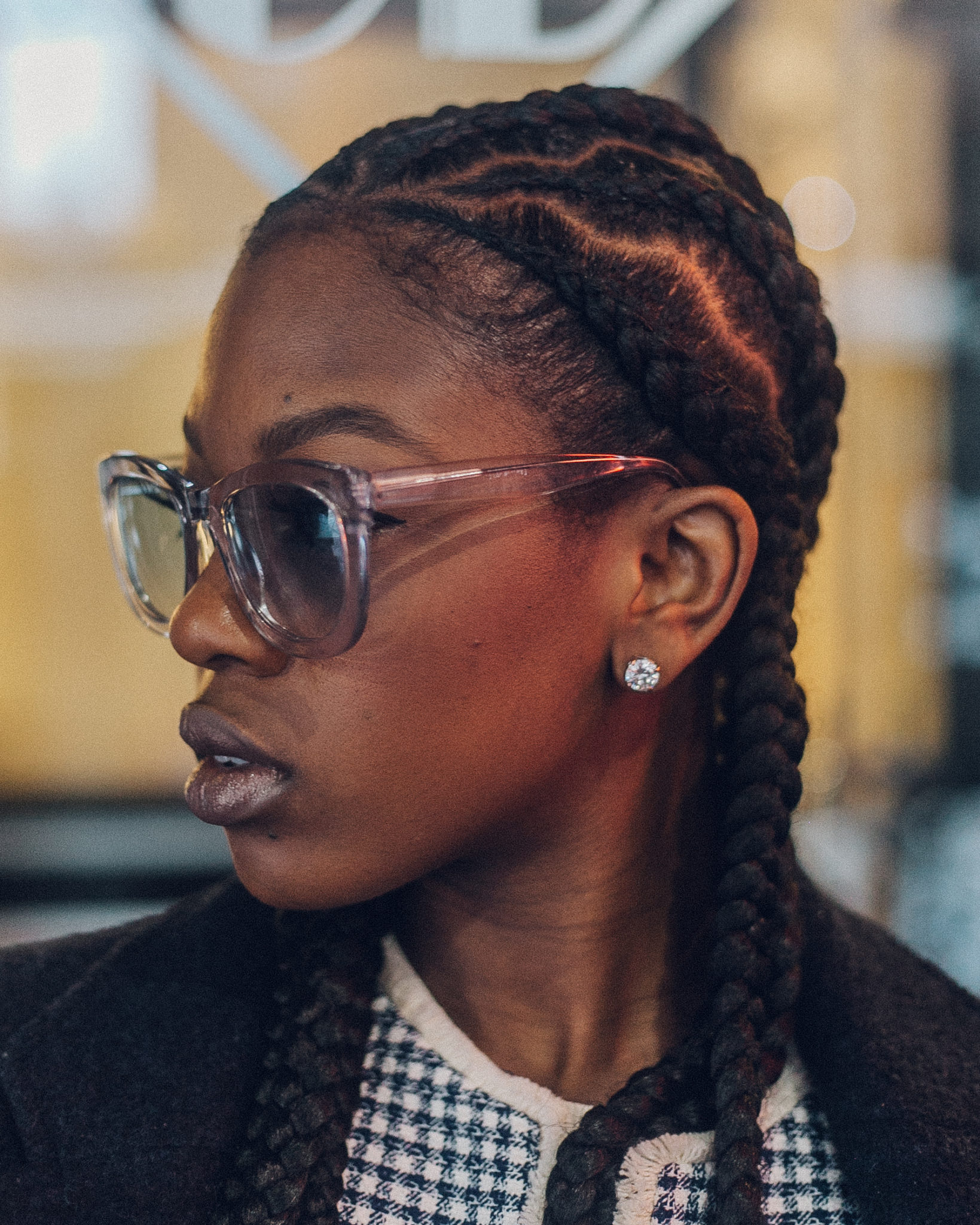
An African American hairstyle called cornrows.

African-American hair, also known as Black hair, refers to natural hair textures, styles and cultural practices associated with people of African descent in the United States. It is most commonly kinky or curly, but it can vary in texture and density. Beyond appearance, Black hair has strong cultural, historical, and social meaning. It has been used to express identity, creativity, and community, while also being shaped by discrimination and beauty standards. In recent years, movements like the natural hair movement and laws such as the CROWN Act have helped promote acceptance and protect against hair-based discrimination.

== Color and texture ==
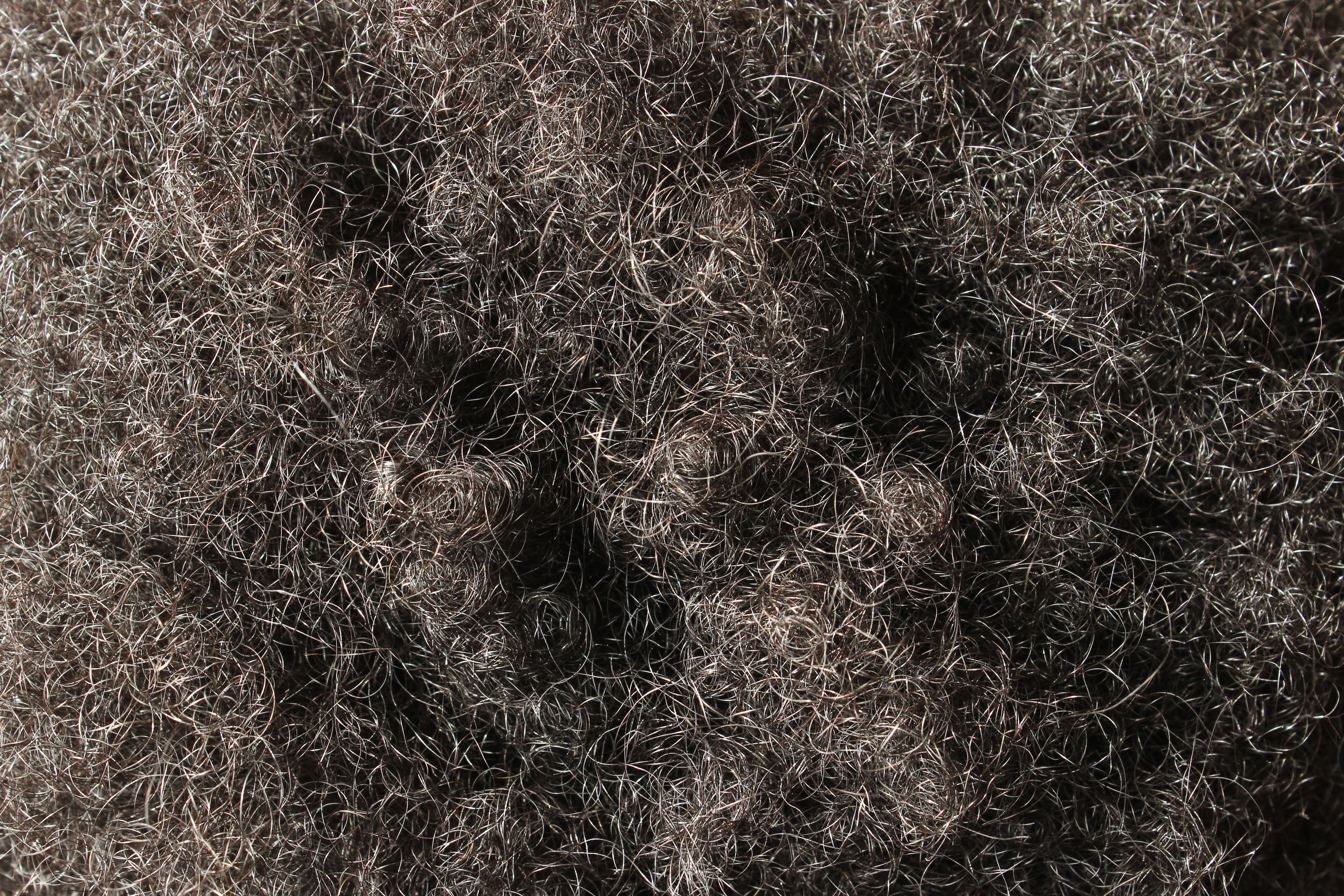
Kinky hair up close.

=== Color ===
Black hair is the product of an inherited genetic trait. The most studied black hair gene is MC1R which causes the body to produce a protein called melanocortin. This protein causes hair follicles to produce a type of melanin pigmentation called eumelanin. Black hair has the highest concentration of this pigmentation with brown, blonde and red hair following behind. In old age, hair comes to turn grey due to the inability of the hair follicle to produce eumelanin. This inability happens after the pigmentation cells in hair follicles die off.

=== Texture ===
Hair follicle shapes that result in different textured hair.

African-American hair comes in a range of textures, but it is most commonly curled or kinked. This texture is influenced by the shape of the hair follicles, where more oval-shaped follicles produce kinkier or curlier hair. Hair can also vary in thickness and density, which affects how full it appears. In general, density represents the amount of hairs that grow from the head, with denser hair resulting from more hairs growing closer together from the scalp. An individual with high-density hair creates a fuller appearance of kinks or curls.

A protective oil called sebum is produced from the scalp to help strengthen and protect hair. However, because of the kink or curl pattern, these natural oils do not easily spread from the roots to the end. As a result, African-American hair can become dry and more prone to breakage without proper moisture and care.

== History ==
=== African origins ===
Since the beginning of African civilizations, hairstyles have been used to convey messages to a greater society. Before boundaries divided Africa into states and countries through colonization, the continent was divided into kingdoms and clans. Within these kingdoms and clans, different hairstyles could "indicate a person's marital status, age, religion, ethnic identity, wealth, rank," surname, health status, geographic origin and the clan to which they belonged. A Wolof man's braided beard could indicate that he was preparing for war. In the Himba tribe, dreadlocks worn down in front of a female's face was a sign that she was going through puberty, while dreadlocks tied at the back of the head were worn by women seeking marriage. Erembe headdresses signified new mothers and married women. In Yoruba culture, people braided their hair to send messages to the gods. As the most elevated part of the body, hair was considered a portal for spirits to pass through to the soul. According to a 20th-century study, the Yoruba often shaved the heads of newborns as a marker of each individual arising from the spirit world. A person's head was shaved again at death to signal the individual's return to the spirit world.

Hair maintenance in traditional Africa was a time-consuming process that aimed at creating a sense of beauty and honoring its spiritual power. According to author Sylvia Arden Boone,

A woman with long thick hair demonstrated the life force, the multiplying power of profusion, prosperity...a green thumb for raising bountiful farms and many healthy children.

Hair was considered divine due to its position at the top of the head, and to allow someone to touch it meant you could trust them. Therefore, hair maintenance was only entrusted to relatives and hairdressers for fear of enemies bringing ill-will to the person in need of hair care. The hair maintenance process could last anywhere from hours to days and involves “washing, combing, oiling, braiding, twisting, and/or decorating the hair.” The Himba people, for example, styled dreadlocks using ground ochre, goat hair, butter and hair extensions. Hair that was clean and neatly braided or arranged with adornments such as beads or shells was a sign of vitality, whereas unkempt and dirty hair signified affliction.

=== During slavery ===
Slaves were often forced by Europeans to shave their heads to prevent lice contracted from the dirty inhumane quarters of slave ships but also to strip them from their culture.

Due to North America's Indigenous population being decimated by European colonists' extreme labor conditions, insufficient diet, violence and diseases, Europeans began aiding in kidnapping and forcibly trafficking Africans to British North America in the early 1600s. Before transporting them, captors and traders shaved the heads of all African adults and children taken captive. The claimed purpose for this action was to prepare for the unsanitary conditions of the slave ships. Due to the cultural and spiritual importance of hair for Africans, the practice of having their heads involuntarily shaved before being sold as enslaved people was in itself a dehumanizing act. In Hair Story: Untangling the Roots of Black Hair in America, Byrd and Tharps write:

The shaved head was the first step the Europeans took to erase the slaves’ culture and alter the relationship between the African and his or her hair... [it] stripped them of a lifeline to their home and a connection to their people. Their language was taken away and they were unable to identify with others from their tribe.

Once their hair began to grow back, many enslaved people did not have the time or the tools to properly maintain their hair, and it became tangled and matted as a result. Enslaved people worked every day of the week, lived in poor conditions and faced the risk of head lice and ringworm. To protect themselves from the sun, dirt, and scalp afflictions, women repurposed unwanted fabrics into hair scarves or kerchiefs (especially if they worked outdoors), while men who worked outdoors wore sun-hats with their hair cut short or completely shaved off.

In describing runaway enslaved people in wanted ads, slaveowners proved that many enslaved people were able to style and maintain their hair after it grew back.

...some slaves wore their hair long and bushy on top and ...others cut it short, or combed and parted it neatly, or shaved it at the back or at the front, or trimmed it to a roll. An African American's hair might be closely cropped on the crown but left long elsewhere; it could be tied behind in a queue, frizzed, combed high from the forehead, plaited, curled on each side of the face, filleted, cut in the form of a circle on the crown, knotted on top of the head, or worn bushy and long below the ears.

Men and women were often given similar clothing to wear and labor tasks to complete, so to achieve a more feminine appearance and differentiate themselves from the men, some women ironed their hair to make it sleek. They also wrapped their hair by brushing it and binding small sections of it with a material such as thread or cotton to prevent knotting. This technique, known as "wrapping" or "threading", shaped the hair into a curl or kink pattern that women kept protected under a scarf or kerchief while working, and took down for special occasions such as church service or weddings.

Plaits, braids and cornrows were the most convenient hairstyles to keep their hair neat and maintained for a week. Enslaved people who worked indoors were forced to wear their hair in one of those styles or a style similar to that of their slaveowner if they did not cover their hair with a scarf, kerchief or wig. By the early 19th century, Sunday was legally declared a day of rest and religious observation, and on Sundays, enslaved people braided each other's hair using the grease or oil they had available, such as butter or goose grease. They used wool carding tools to detangle their hair, kerosene, and cornmeal to cleanse the scalp. Fats, oils and eggs were used as conditioner. Enslaved people in North America named cornrows for their resemblance to rows of corn in a field. (In Central and South America and the Caribbean, enslaved people called the style "canerows" because of its resemblance to sugarcane fields.) Braid patterns became symbols for freedom, and different styles and patterns were used as guides to plantations, resembling roads and paths to travel or avoid.

Racial attitudes among White people in 17th and 18th century America held a negative connotation of the kinky hair of enslaved Africans and African-Americans. They called kinky hair "wool" in an effort to deem it inferior to the texture of their own hair. Since the onset of the enslavement of Africans in British America, the slurs "woolly" and "nappy" were also used by White people to express disapproval of kinky hair. It was also mocked through caricatured stereotypes of Africans and African-Americans in the media, which motivated women especially to keep their hair covered. Although the practice of wearing head scarves was forced upon women by law or by slaveowners, the type of head covering worn came to symbolize respectability, and could distinguish a married woman from an unmarried woman or a fieldworker from a houseworker.

=== After slavery ===
After slavery was abolished in the United States, negative attitudes about the appearance of Black Americans and derogatory terms for kinky hair persisted into the Reconstruction and Jim Crow eras because Black people were still considered inferior to White people. During this time, wig manufacturers were the only companies that advertised a Black standard of beauty. Kinky hair worn in its natural state was still considered undesirable, and media promoted a Eurocentric beauty ideal that included straight hair. In her article "Hairitage: Women Writing Race in Children's Literature", literary critic Dianne Johnson notes an early 20th-century advertisement:

Once upon a time there lived a Good Fairy whose daily thoughts were of pretty little boys and girls and of beautiful women and handsome men and of how she might make beautiful those unfortunate ones whom nature had not given long, wavy hair...

One of Winold Reiss's Brown Madonna (1925) most famous works, reimagines Black women as maternal and spiritual figures with straight hair. The image serves as the frontispiece of The New Negro, a text written to counter negative Black stereotypes and redefine Black people during the New Negro Movement.

For some African Americans, the notion of assimilation in to White American society was ideal, because it held a perceived promise of better socioeconomic status. One way they attempted to assimilate was by straightening their hair to fit the White American beauty ideal.

...hair straighteners marketed by white companies suggest to blacks that only through changing physical features will persons of African descent be afforded class mobility within black communities and social acceptance by the dominant culture.

— Noliwe M. Rooks

To straighten their hair, African-American women used a hair product and wide-bristled pressing or hot comb, a metal tool that was heated in an oven or on a stove before it was passed through the hair. It was later mass-produced in a simpler, self-heating form. It could take hours to complete the straightening process, and because of the high temperature of the hot comb, burning and damaging the hair or skin were always high-risk. Because it easily absorbs moisture, kinky hair straightened with a hot comb can quickly return to its tightly coiled state if exposed to too much moisture, such as rain or humidity. African-American men typically wore their hair relatively short, and they avoided passing a hot comb through their hair, because it was more difficult and dangerous to do so.

From the early to mid-20th century, conking was a popular style for African-American men, and required the use of a chemical treatment known as a relaxer or perm, which achieved longer-lasting straightening results. The practice of using a relaxer began during slavery, when enslaved men covered their hair in axle grease to straighten and dye it. Before the late 1960s, there were no publications that explained how to straighten kinky hair with chemicals. The earliest chemical straighteners caused severe hair breakage and dyed the hair red, so it was not until the mid-20th century that relaxers became a popular and longer-lasting alternative to hot combs for African-American women. Both men and women coated their hair with a strong acid that stripped the outer layer and altered the shape of the hair shaft, causing it to "relax" or straighten, and the longer the chemical was left on the hair, the straighter the hair would become. If left on the hair too long, the relaxer could burn the scalp and cause sores to form.

=== Civil rights era ===
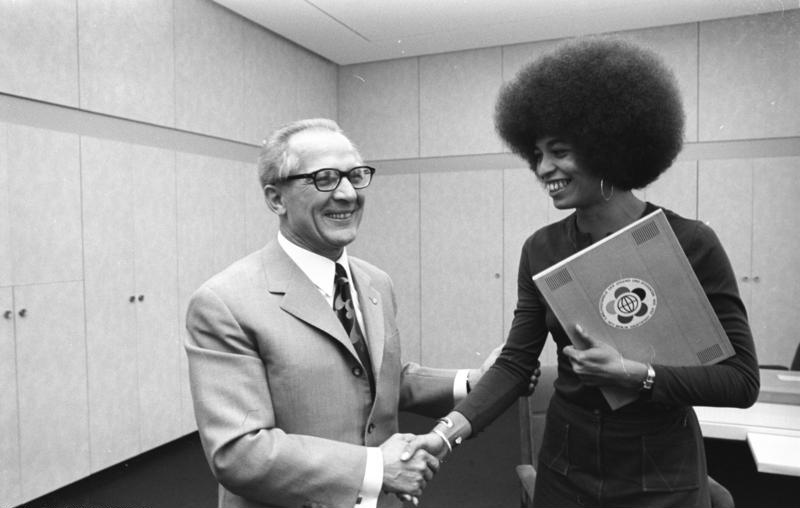
Angela Davis (right) in 1972 with her influential hairstyle

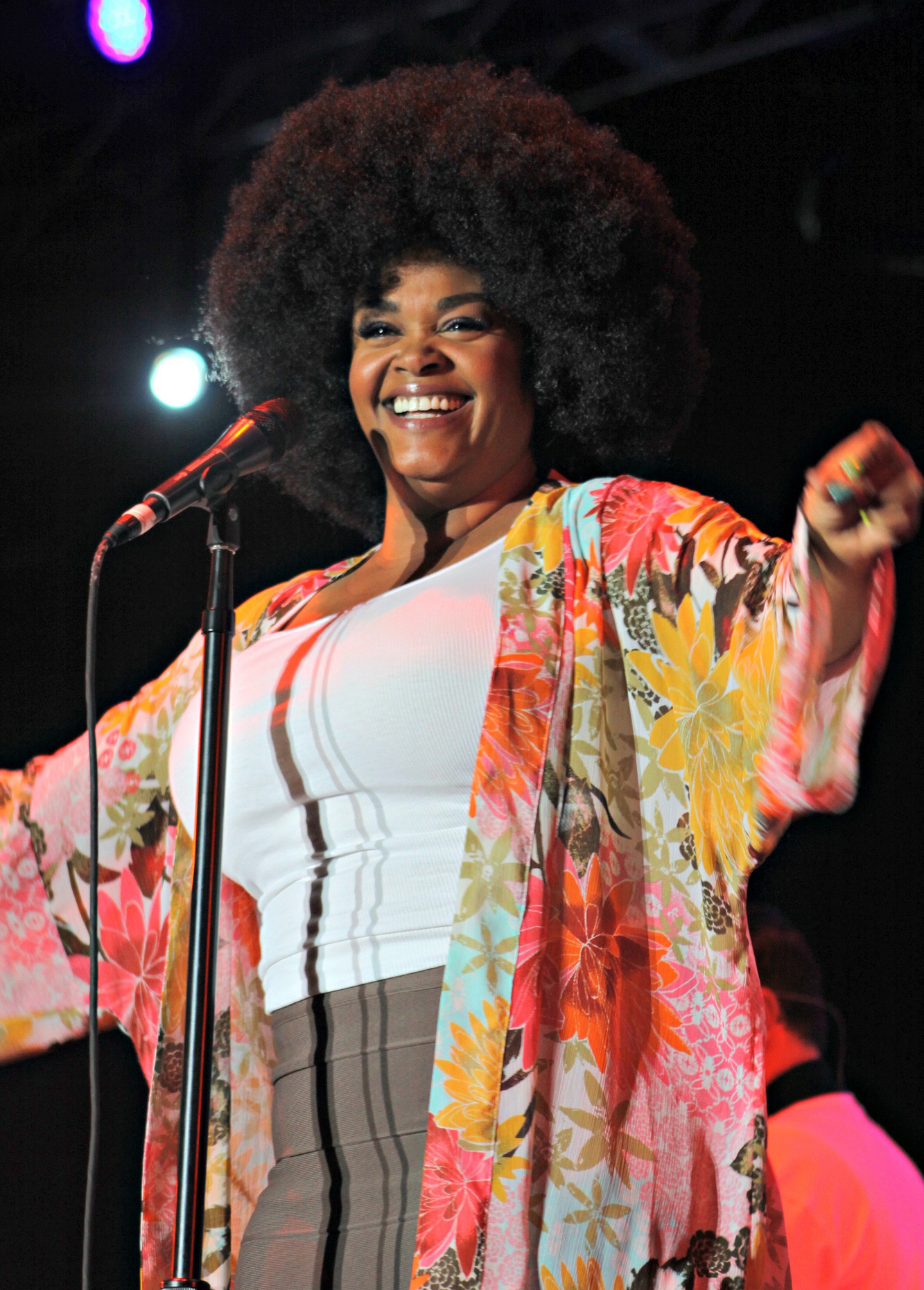
Singer-songwriter and actress Jill Scott in March 2012

The Afro, which hit its stride in the 1960s, was an expression of pride, connection, power, revolution and differentiation. The Afro first gained popularity with performers, artists, activists, youth and nationalists.

Young people who did not adopt this trend were for the first time judged and subject to "blacker-than-thou" policing by their peers. African-Americans began to use their hair as a way to showcase a link to their African ancestors and Blacks throughout the diaspora. The Afro, in conjunction with the Civil Rights Movement, was helping to define black identity.

Some artists used their actual hair as an expression of art. In David Hammons's American Costume, he pressed his own body onto paper to create an image of what being African-American means and looks like. He crafted the hair on the work by applying fingerprints to the paper.

Young Black Americans were ‘froing their hair in great numbers as a way to emulate the style of the Black Panthers and convey their racial pride. Although the Afro started in New York, it was Angela Davis, a college professor at UCLA and an associate of the Black Panther Party, who pioneered the Afro as a political statement. In embracing naturalism, she glorified the Black aesthetic and facilitated its power to connect Black people to the Civil Rights Movement. Her Afro became especially notorious because of its presence in her "Wanted" ad, as it was her most prominent identifier. It became a way to celebrate African-ness and embrace heritage while politically rejecting European ideals. Men and women in Chicago and beyond wore it as a way to support a proud way of carrying oneself in the world and occupying space.

In relation to hair, the time between the 1970s and the 1990s could be described as open and experimental. "Despite occasional political flare-ups, individual choice would increasingly dictate African-American hairstyles in this era" Trendy styles like braids were even adopted by whites, especially after white actress Bo Derek wore them in the movie 10. Although braids, cornrows and dreadlocks were becoming mainstream, they stirred up controversy and continue to when worn in the professional sphere.

== Popular culture ==
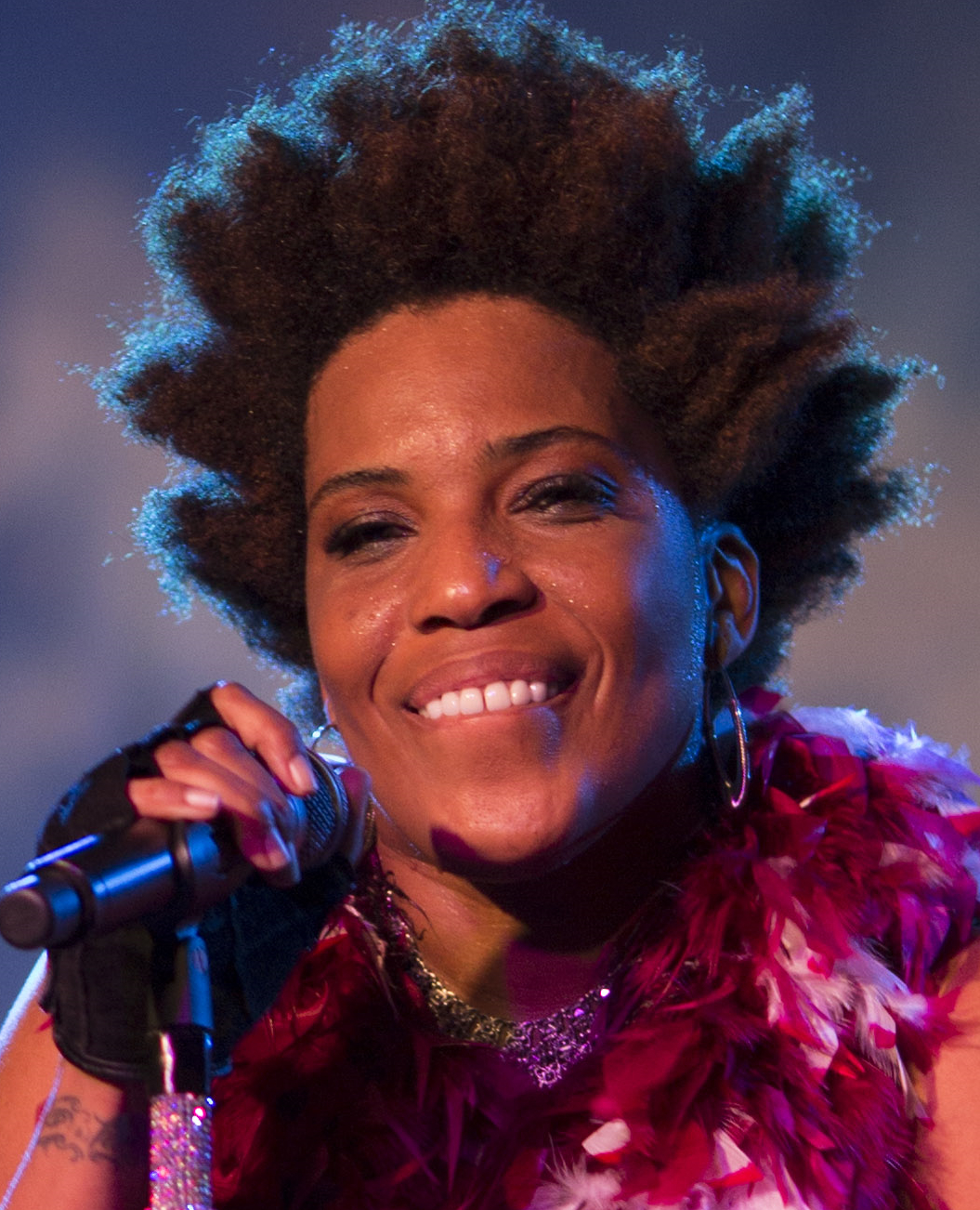
Macy Gray, distinguished African-American vocalist and actress, exemplifying cultural heritage through her signature afro hairstyle.

=== Natural hair movement ===
African-American culture has increasingly embraced natural hair through the natural hair movement. It includes people with kinky hair who resist the images used to represent them and abstain from the use of chemical hair products in favor of products that will promote healthy natural hair. The initial emergence of the natural hair movement occurred in the 1960s with activists such as Angela Davis supporting the movement. In the late 1970s–1980s, the natural hair movement began to slow down due to the social pressures placed on African-Americans to assimilate to European beauty standards. It was not until the 2000s that the second wave of the natural hair movement emerged. The movement has since been greatly influenced by society and media, ranging from the work and appearance of textile artist Sonya Clark, singer Solange Knowles, poet Maya Angelou and actress Lupita Nyong'o to an uprising of natural hair-focused YouTube channels and blogs. The movement seeks to continue to encourage African American women to embrace their natural hair despite negative stereotypes about black natural hair that arose from European beauty standards. More recently, the natural hair movement has found momentum online with various Vloggers documenting their natural hair journey to encourage other African American women and men to participate in the movement, educate the public, and create positive images of black hair in media. The movement's popularity has also encouraged corporations and government agencies to create policies that are inclusive of natural black hair. The availability of products for natural black hair has been helped by the founding of Black-owned hair product companies such as Ruka Hair in the UK, founded by Tendai Moyo.

=== "Good hair" ===
"Good hair" is a phrase used in some Black communities to describe the perceived prestige of straight or loosely curled hair (especially when genetically influenced by non-African ancestry) in contrast to afro-textured hair. "Good hair" is also used to refer to hair that is strong, thick and soft to the touch. Although many hair stylists or beauticians would define "good hair" as "healthy hair", the phrase is rarely used in this manner in informal African-American circles. Instead, it is used metaphorically to characterize beauty and acceptance. These standards vary for African-American men and women.

The term's circulation within the Black community in the North America has an uncertain origin. Artist India Arie's song "I Am Not My Hair" speaks specifically to the usage of the term "good hair" in the African-American community and in broader contexts. Comedian Chris Rock's 2009 documentary Good Hair made a wider audience aware of the importance of the term within the Black community. In the documentary, Rock explores the role of hair in the lives of African-Americans. He interviews Reverend Al Sharpton, who asserts, "My relaxed hair is just as African-based as an Afro because it all came out of black culture."

=== Facial hair ===
Maintaining facial hair is more prevalent among African-American men than in other male populations in the U.S. In fact, the soul patch is so named because African-American men, particularly jazz musicians, popularized the style. The preference for facial hair among African-American men is due partly to personal taste, but also because they are more prone than other ethnic groups to develop a condition known as pseudofolliculitis barbae. The condition is commonly referred to as razor bumps, and due to the condition, many prefer not to shave.

=== Styles ===
African-American Hairstyles have varied over time and are often influenced by culture, history, and personality. :

- Afros
- Conk
- Hi-top fade
- Jheri curl
- Cornrows
- Bantu knots
- Box braids
- Dreadlocks
- Twists
- Waves

== Discrimination related to black hairstyles ==
Black hairstyles are often subject to workplace and school discrimination.

In Rogers v. American Airlines (1981), Renee Rogers, a black female flight attendant, sued her employer American Airlines for prohibiting her from wearing cornrows and braids at work. The court dismissed Rogers' arguments that the ban was discriminatory based on race and sex, and ruled in favor of American Airlines. The ban prohibited braids and dreadlocks in favor of a bun style, which can be a challenge to achieve with afro-textured hair that has not been straightened with heat or chemicals. Since the late 20th century, many restrictions have been loosened, and professional African-American women now wear a wider variety of hairstyles.

As with women, African American men have also faced hairstyle-based discrimination in the workplace. In the case of Thornton v. Encore Global, Jeffery Thornton, a black man, sued his former employer Encore Global for denying him a job as a technical supervisor after he worked for the company for four years. Court documents stated that an unnamed hiring manager at Encore told Thornton that he needed to trim his locks off his ears, eyes and shoulders before he could be promoted to the position. This was the first time that an employer was accused of violating California's CROWN Act since the legislation took effect in January 2020.

In 2014, the United States Army implemented a ban on predominantly black hairstyles. The ban includes dreadlocks, large cornrows and twists. The rationale for this decision is that the aforementioned hairstyles look unkempt. African-American women in the Army may be forced to choose between small cornrows and chemically processing their hair if their natural hair is not long enough to fit a permitted hairstyle.

=== In schools ===
Throughout the history of education in the United States, African American students have faced significant disparities in treatment compared to their peers. These disparities include higher rates of disciplinary action and discriminatory practices related to personal appearance. For instance, there have been cited cases where African American students are disciplined at significantly higher rates than their counterparts, often due to dress code policies that target natural hairstyles as inappropriate or distracting.

Example cases
Year	Student	Description
2020	DeAndre Arnold	DeAndre Arnold, a senior at Barbers Hill High School in Texas, faced suspension and threats of expulsion due to his dreadlocks. The school's dress code prohibited hairstyles that "disrupt the educational process," which was interpreted to include dreadlocks. Despite Arnold's good academic standing and involvement in sports, the school's policy enforced a strict standard that was perceived as targeting his natural hairstyle. In contrast, white students with long or styled hair often faced no similar scrutiny.
2019	Asten Johnson	Asten Johnson faced threats of expulsion due to his natural hairstyle, which was in violation of the school's dress code that prohibited "unconventional" hairstyles. Johnson's hair was described as "unprofessional," a label that was frequently applied to natural hairstyles worn by African American students. The policy was less stringent on white students who wore similar lengths or styles that did not face the same level of enforcement.
2023	Darryl George	Darryl George, a high school student in Texas, faced disciplinary actions for wearing his natural curly hair, which was deemed "inappropriate" according to the school's dress code. The policy was particularly restrictive towards hairstyles that deviated from a certain norm, which disproportionately affected African American students. George's academic excellence and participation in extracurricular activities did not mitigate the impact of the policy, unlike white students who were often allowed to style their hair freely without facing similar penalties.
2018	Andrew Johnson	In 2018, wrestler Andrew Johnson was told by his referee, Alan Mahoney, that he needed to cut his dreads or forfeit his match. That same night, videos and pictures began to surface online of Andrew having his dreads cut off with a pair of scissors. This sparked public outrage online, with some people questioning why Johnson was able to wrestle in matches prior to this one and not have any problems. People began to question Mahoney's call during the match, with some saying that the ultimatum was derived from racism. In 2016, Mahoney was accused of calling his fellow referee a racial slur. Since this incident, Mahoney was suspended from officiating for two years, and the New Jersey Interscholastic Athletic Association and the state's attorney general's office's civil rights division have opened investigations into the incident.

=== CROWN Act ===
On March 18, 2022, the United States House of Representatives passed the CROWN (Create a Respectful and Open Workplace for Natural Hair) Act, an act aiming to protect individuals from hair-based discrimination in the workplace. The bill forbids race-based hair discrimination at the federal level, notably when the hair style or hair texture being discriminated against is particularly tied to a culture or race. However, many states are "employment at will" which allows employers to discharge employees for any reason, or no reason.

The intent is to protect workers from discrimination related to questionable African-American styles such as afros, cornrows, Bantu knots, and dreadlocks. Similar acts had already been introduced and passed in several U.S. states including California, New York, Colorado, New Jersey, New York City, Virginia, Washington, Illinois, and Maryland.

== Cultural appropriation of African American hair ==
White women such as Kylie Jenner have gone viral on Instagram for wearing traditional black hairstyles even though black women are discriminated for it. On TikTok, Asians have permed their hair to create afros. Marie Claire in 2014 described Kendall Jenner’s braided hairstyle as “new” even though African-American women have been wearing the hairstyle for decades.

== Hair products ==
African Americans often use products with moisturizing ingredients such as shea butter and coconut oil. Black owned brands such as Shea Moisture, Cantu and Cécred by Beyoncé cater to African American hair. Annie Turnbo Malone was one of the earliest innovators of African American hair care products.

== See also ==
- Black is Beautiful
- Brown Paper Bag Test
- Colorism
- Discrimination based on hair texture in the United States
- High yellow
- Passing (racial identity)
- Pencil test
- Plaçage
- Protective hairstyle
- Hair Like Mine
- Cultural appropriation#Hairstyles, makeup, and body modifications
- Anu Prestonia
