= Professionalism =

Standards expected in a workplace

Professionalism is a set of standards that an individual is expected to adhere to in a workplace, usually to appear serious, uniform, or respectful. What constitutes professionalism is often debated and varies from workplace to workplace and between cultures. Professionalism is typically defined as a mix of professional ethics, appropriate behavior, and dress code.

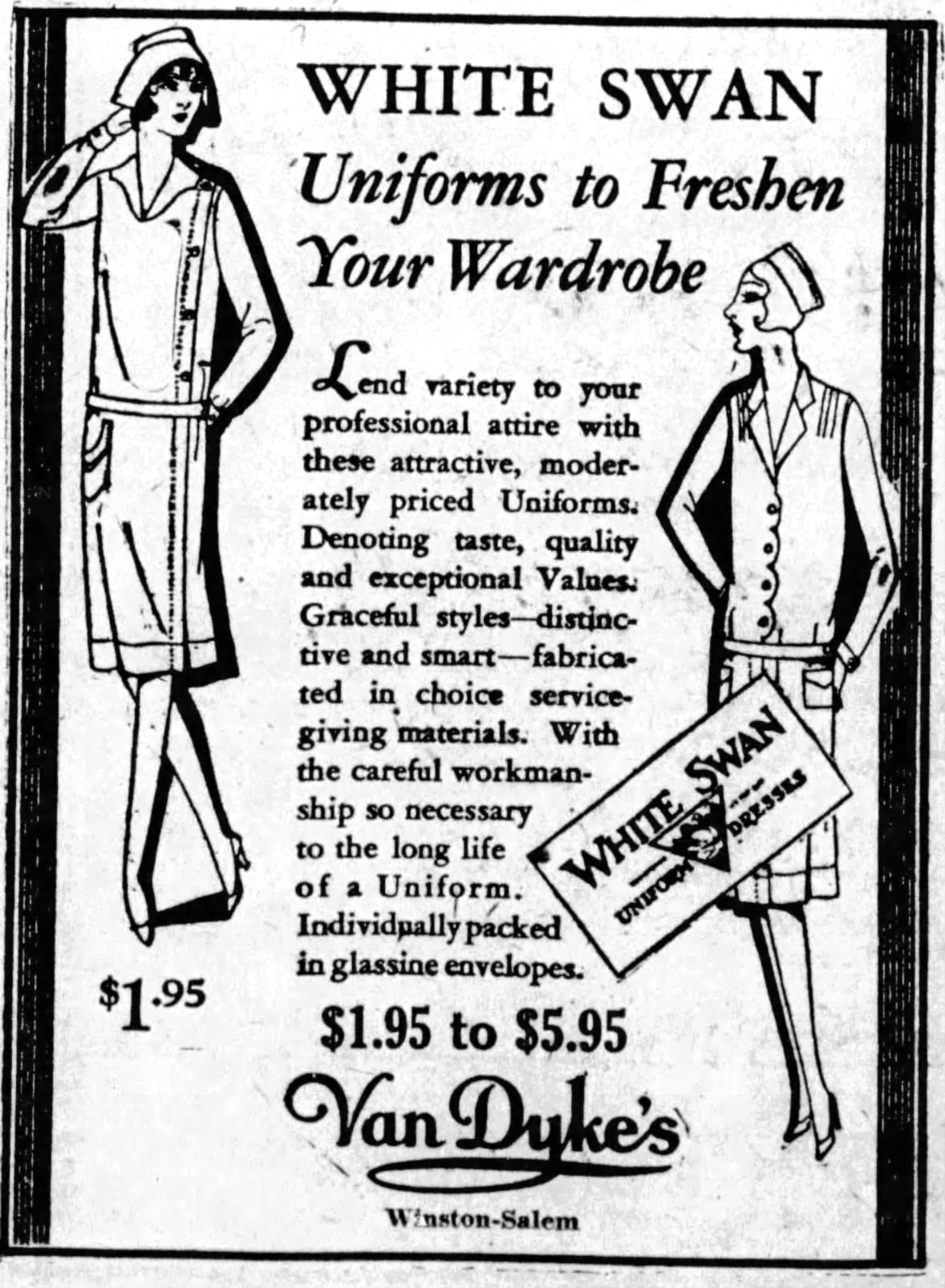
Professional attire advertisement (1930)

== Definition ==
Common traits of a "professional" person include:

- integrity
- punctuality
- reliability
- organization skills
- emotional intelligence
- appropriate dress

Expectations of professionalism are often unsaid or unwritten. Trainings and clear communication can help young people entering the workforce avoid "unprofessional" behavior.

A business's professional standards affect its reputation.

=== Cultural differences ===
Cultural expectations of professionalism differ around the world. In Japan, humility is valued as a professional trait. In the Middle East, hospitality is an important character quality of a professional person. For international companies, understanding differing views of professional behavior is important. Time zones can also pose a challenge for professional communication.

== Changing attitudes ==
Having tattoos is considered taboo in some workplaces, but this has been changing in the 21st century. A University of Miami survey found that respondents who had tattoos were more likely to be employed than non-tattooed respondents, although the researchers cautioned that this result was correlative. In New Zealand, some businesses have dropped bans on traditional Māori tattoos.

In the United States some workplaces have "Jean Fridays" where employees may wear blue jeans to work for free or for five dollars. The allowance of jeans into the white-collar workforce on Fridays has led some workplaces to adopt jeans as professional attire for the whole week.

Following the COVID-19 pandemic, professional expectations around video calls, work-from-home behavior, and after-hours availability began to change. Video call "camera etiquette" became more widespread and important.

In the 2020s American CEOs began to curse more frequently in public, sparking discussion on to what extent cursing is "professional" in the workplace. Whether cursing in the workplace is a legally protected right in the US or not was a contentious issue between the US Chamber of Commerce and the National Labor Relations Board in 2023.

== Criticism of concept ==
Critics of professionalism typically say that some specific standards, such as hairstyle or clothing restrictions, are outdated or overly limiting. Professional standards may be seen as conformist or as "selling-out."

Hairstyles are also subject to professionalism requirements in many workplaces. In the United States employers have banned natural hairstyles for African Americans, resulting in a push for CROWN Act laws (Create a Respectful and Open World for Natural Hair). Professional standards that generally apply to only one race have been criticized as a form of discrimination.
