= Good hair (disambiguation) =

Good hair may refer to:

- Good hair, a phrase
- Good Hair, a 2009 film
- Hair care, healthy hair
- African-American Hair
