= Tendai Moyo =

Zimbabwean-born British business women

Tendai Moyo, also known as Varaidzo Tendai Moyo, is the Zimbabwean-born co-founder and CEO of Ruka Hair, a direct to consumer hair extension brand for Afro-Caribbean women who prefer natural hair.

== Life and career ==
Moyo was born in Harare, Zimbabwe. In post-colonial Zimbabwe, social expectations pressurised Black women with African American hair type 3c and above, that is, with tightly curled, coiled or kinky hair, hair that has its own requirements. Convention required them to wear their hair as straight as possible, in order to mimic ideas of European standards of beauty. Moyo found that hair straightening, whether by using chemical relaxers, hair irons or hot combs, causes hair breakage, hair loss or scalp burns and is an expensive and lengthy process that also implies there is something wrong with black hair worn naturally. This view is an expression of racial discrimination and feeds internalized racism.

Moyo moved to Malawi, then to Swindon in the UK where, unlike in the USA where some 35% of African-American women can find their hair products in supermarkets, she found it impossible to find black hair salons or products. Moyo studied at the London School of Economics and Political Science gaining a B.Sc in Business, Mathematics & Statistics in 2018. She also received a certificate in Jen Rubio - Direct to Consumer from The Business of Fashion in December 2018. After graduating, Moyo worked in banking, as Head of Finance at Educo limited, from 2017 to 2019 and as a consultant with Bain & Company until 2020. She was inspired by the natural hair movement and then turned her attention to the lack of availability of Afro-Caribbean hair products in the UK.

Fewer than 1% of salons in the UK cater for Afro-Caribbean women’s hair, the main products sold being chemical relaxers. Moyo wanted to see Black women’s curly, coily and kinky hair textures and hair products represented in the mainstream haircare industry. In 2021, Moyo co-founded Ruka Hair with Nigerian colleague Ugo Agbai. Crowdfunding, to help their Black-owned startup business, raised money fast, their investors including Ian Hogarth, founder of Songkick, Tom Adeyoola, founder of MeTail and cofounder of Extend Ventures, and Nicole Crentsil, founder of Black Girl Fest.

For Afro-Caribbean women wanting natural hair with styling options, the company now makes biodegradable, natural hair extensions of different lengths in hair texture types up to 4c. These are available direct to the wearer. Ruka Hair is the only Black-owned hair concession to open in the department store Selfridges. Moyo believes in the importance of educating clients, stylists, salon owners and hair product producers about the nature and care of Afro-Caribbean hair and so hosts training videos, In addition, the British Beauty Council has successfully pushed for Afro-Caribbean hair care to be included in UK hair stylist qualification syllabuses.
