= Silk press =

Hairstyle and hair straightening technique for kinky hair

The silk press is a hairstyle and hair straightening technique for kinky hair that creates a sleek and shiny style using hot tools, and differs from chemical relaxers which use lye for a longer lasting effect. The silk press style lasts one or several weeks, and moisture such as sweat causes hair to return to its natural coils and texture. In the 2020s, the vice presidency and U.S. presidential campaign of Kamala Harris brought attention to the silk press.

== Technique and upkeep ==
A silk press takes about two hours and can be achieved at home or at a salon. Hair is washed, conditioned, and dried completely, often with a blow dryer and round brush to stretch the hair. Hair is then straightened with an electric flat iron. Stylists recommend using heat protectant on hair and keeping the hot iron below 450 degrees F to alleviate heat damage. Some hairdressers advise against wearing the style all the time due to the effects of regular heat.

A typical silk press lasts two to three weeks and may require at-home touch ups with a flat iron. Maintenance techniques include sleeping with a satin bonnet or pillowcase and applying hair oil. Sweat, humidity, and other moisture cause hair to revert to its natural coils and texture, and some may prefer cool weather for the silk press style when sweat is less common.

== History and culture ==
The silk press has roots in the early 20th century, when hair straightening with hot tools became widespread among African American women. Straight hair brought black women closer to European beauty ideals, and may have been seen as a strategy for safety and employment societal racism. Early hair tools used heat from the stove and were known to burn the ears and scalp because temperature could not be precisely controlled. These non-electric tools included hot combs popularized by Madam C. J. Walker in the 1920s, and pullers with two balls on the end of a handle which are pulled through hair to loosen kinks.

=== In popular culture ===
In the late 20th century, the silk press became associated with professional black women in the workplace. Prominent examples in pop culture were seen on the character Clair Huxtable of The Cosby Show, Tia and Tamera Mowry of the 1990s sitcom Sister, Sister, and the singer Aaliyah.

Silk press styles had a resurgence when a natural hair movement took force in 2008, and people eschewed scalp-damaging relaxers for non-chemical alternatives such as heat-based straightening methods like the silk press (as well as various natural and protective styles). Michelle Obama was known for her silk press in the White House which resembled non-Black styles in order to avoid negative attention, a look styled by Yene Demtew with bouncy curled ends. Her silk press at the Biden inauguration in 2020 was nicknamed "The Michelle" by fans.

The silk press gained additional mainstream interest in the 2020s due to the vice presidency and 2024 U.S. presidential campaign of Kamala Harris, who has worn a silk press for her political career. A hairstylist in Washington D.C. reported a surge of demand for silk press styles and a new perception of the look as "presidential hair" in the summer of 2024. Keke Palmer asked Harris about her hair routine in a podcast interview. Harris revealed that she straightens her hair with a round brush and hair dryer, and does not use a hot iron to avoid heat damage.

== See also ==
- Hair straightening
- Relaxer
