= Nappturality =

Term for natural Black hair

The term Nappturality refers to hair and is a combination of the terms nappy, natural and spirituality. Patricia Gaines, using the web identity "Deecoily" first coined the word "nappturality" in 2002 and created a website of the same name that year. The term has been used primarily by African American women who have chosen to exclusively wear their hair in its natural, afro-textured state, free from chemicals intended to straighten the hair.

The term nappturality takes the word "nappy", which is typically used in a derogatory manner, and translates it into a word of empowerment. Several commercial hair products and websites have capitalized on the success of the term nappturality. The website of the same name, nappturality.com is the largest online community dedicated to natural African American hair care and aims to "empower Black women by helping them understand and recognize the beauty of their natural hair in its natural state". Examples of napptural hairstyles include afros, braids, twists, puffs, wash and gos, bantu knots and many others.

== See also ==
- Natural hair movement
- Nappy Roots
