= Virginia Human Rights Act =

1987 American state statute

The Virginia Human Rights Act (§2.2-3900) is a 1987 Virginia statute which enacted statewide civil rights protections. The law was amended in 2020 through the Virginia Values Act.

== History ==
Prior to 1987, state law only addressed private sector employment discrimination on the basis of disability. The initial VHRA was signed by Governor Gerald Baliles in 1987, initially prohibiting discrimination on the bases of race, color, religion, national origin, sex, age, marital status or disability, in employment as well as in public accommodations, including educational institutions, and in real estate transactions. The law also established a State Council on Human Rights, which is authorized to receive, investigate, seek to conciliate, hold hearings and make findings and recommendations upon complaints alleging unlawful discriminatory practices. A 1997 amendment signed by Governor George Allen added "pregnancy, childbirth or related medical conditions" to the VHRA as protected classes, and a 2005 amendment signed by Governor Mark Warner clarified that any mention of "because of sex or gender" or "on the basis of sex or gender" in state anti-discrimination law would include all women affected by pregnancy, childbirth or related medical conditions.

=== Northam era ===
On March 6, 2020, the CROWN Act was signed by Governor Ralph Northam, which added hair style and texture to the list of protected classes. On April 11 of the same year, the Virginia Values Act (SB 868) was signed into law by Northam. In addition to protecting against discrimination on the basis of sexual orientation and gender identity in employment, housing, credit, and public accommodations, the Values Act made the following adjustments to the VHRA:

- expanded the definition of covered employers
- expanded the causes of action available to aggrieved employees,
- increased the classes of employees who are protected,
- expanded the remedies available to employees who sue.

The Values Act took effect on July 1, 2020, the first of its kind in the Southern United States. Another law signed by Northam, HB 696, authorized local governments to enact human rights ordinances to ban discrimination in housing, employment, public accommodations, credit, or education based on sexual orientation or gender identity, provided that such ordinance not be inconsistent with nor more stringent than any applicable state law. In addition, the law allows local governments to establish local commissions on human rights.

=== Youngkin era ===
On April 2, 2024, Governor Glenn Youngkin signed HB 18, which "ethnic origin" and "citizenship or immigration status" to the VHRA's list of protected classes. On April 17, Youngkin signed two further revisions:

- HB 782, which updates language with regard to dual filing of unlawful discriminatory charges
- SB 350, which allows an individual to file a civil action in court if Virginia’s Office of Civil Rights of the Department of Law ("Office of Civil Rights") fails to issue a notice of the right to file a civil action when either (a) 180 days have passed since the complaint was filed or (b) the Office finds that it will be unable to complete its investigation within 180 days after filing.

=== Spanberger era ===
On April 15, 2026, Governor Abigail Spanberger signed legislation updating the VHRA:

- SB 637, which reformed the definition of “employer” to businesses with at least five employees (uniformly lowering the minimum from a variety of thresholds) and extended age-discrimination protections to employers with at least five employees.
- HB 925, which extended the deadline to file a discrimination charge with the Virginia Office of Civil Rights from 300 days to two years and allow suit after 180 days if the charge is filed with a local human rights agency.
