= Anu Prestonia =

Anu Prestonia is an African-American hairdresser based in New York. She is considered an expert in the field of natural hair styling for black women.

Prestonia grew up in Norfolk, Virginia, and later moved to New York City at 10 years old. In 2012, she produced In Our Heads About Our Hair, a documentary about hair acceptance, and African-American women's hair care and self esteem.

In 2021, she launched Anu Essentials, a line of perfumes and body care oils.
