= Discrimination based on hair texture =

Discrimination based on hair texture, also known as texturism, is a form of social injustice, where kinky hair or coarse hair types, and their associated hair styles, are viewed negatively, often perceived as unprofessional, unattractive, or unclean. This view can lead, for example, to some school students being excluded from class.

== History ==
In the Western world, kinky hair has historically been treated with disdain, by members of all ethnicities. In the 15th and 16th centuries, the Atlantic slave trade saw sub-Saharan Africans forcibly transported from West and Central Africa to the Americas, and upon their arrival in the New World, their heads would be shaved in effort to erase their culture, as many Africans used hairstyles to signify their tribal identity, marital status, age, and other personal characteristics. Early on, both men and women would wear headscarves in order to protect their scalps from sunburn and lice but, as time progressed, these hair wraps became more associated with women, who began to wear them in various fashions, based on their region and personal style. In the 19th century, when enslaved men and women were no longer being brought from Africa, quality of life increased for them somewhat as they became more valuable in their owners' eyes. Now enjoying Sundays off, Black women would take the day to style their hair, uncovering it for church services but keeping it wrapped Monday through Saturday. As traditional styling tools were not available to them, Black women began to use butter, kerosene, and bacon grease and combs meant for livestock to style their hair.

The concept of "good hair" arose in the time leading up to the abolition of slavery in the United States. To straighten their hair, Black women would often use a mixture of lye, which could burn their skin, and other harmful chemical treatments to become "presentable" towards white standards. Madam C. J. Walker, an African American businesswoman, achieved great fortune and recognition for widening the teeth of the hot comb, as well as the modern perm, which would straighten afro-textured hair and become a staple in the black community. This "good hair" concept not only created a set standard to adhere to the white community, but it created a divide within the black community itself. The ideal of textureism arose as black [women] with tighter curls were seen as unkept or less than those with looser curls, who were often of European descent.

== Discrimination by country ==
=== Canada ===
Similar to many countries around the world, black and First Nations Canadians have experienced discrimination in educational and professional environments. One type of discrimination has been based on their hair textures and styles. The cause of this type of discrimination is based on long standing Eurocentric views of beauty that were established during early colonization. Setting this standard was used as a tool to suppress both African and First nations culture. Though Canada has made a commitment to support anti-racism and reconciliation there has been no specific protections put in place (such as the United States CROWN Act) to protect against this form of discrimination.

In Canada, there has been notable cases of discrimination that made national news sites about Black Canadian women being discriminated against at their work place, due to their hair being deemed unprofessional. In 2016, a mixed race woman in Scarborough, Ontario, who was working at the retail chain ZARA, was asked to remove her box braids because her hair style was considered unprofessional. In another case, an African-American woman living in Montreal, Quebec, was sent home from a restaurant and denied shifts, because her hair was in cornrows. The woman gained representation through the Centre for Research Action on Race Relations (CRARR), and filed a case with the Quebec Human Rights Commission based racial and gender discrimination. She won her case and was awarded $14,500 in damages.

First Nations people in Canada have also experienced discrimination and harm due to wearing hair styles that do not conform to Eurocentric view. During the time of residential schools, First Nations children braids were cut from their heads to force assimilation. Similar incidents have happened recently in Canada. In 2009, in Thunder Bay, Ontario, a First Nations boy's hair was cut by a teachers aide. In 2018, a boy in Calgary, Alberta came from school with his hair cut after another student bullied him and then cut out his braid. Braids hold significant ties to the past before colonization and have important culture meaning.

=== Dominican Republic ===
In the Dominican Republic, hair is seen as an important attribute of physical beauty. Many view straight hair as beautiful and appropriate for a professional setting while also seeing afro-textured hair as inappropriate and distracting. This mindset had stemmed from racial discrimination. This has changed over the years in the United States and abroad as the American Natural Hair Movement gains popularity.

In the Dominican Republic, hair straightening is done for the same reasons it is done in the United States and the diaspora for convenience and to conform to western beauty standards. In 1996 Rooks affirmed "Hair in 1976 spoke to racial identity politics as well as bonding between African American women. Its style could lead to acceptance or rejection from certain groups and social classes, and its styling could provide the possibility of a career".

Straightened and more conservative styles are still the standard in the workplace, as it is in the United States and other countries with African descendants of the diaspora. The views expressed aren't exclusive to the Dominican Republic. Contrary to popular misconception many Dominican women do wear natural hair and it is becoming increasingly accepted in society.

=== Indonesia ===
Indonesians living in the west half of New Guinea (Papua Barat) who are Melanesian are often racially profiled or insulted for their curly hair by their own countrypeople elsewhere outside the island who are straight-haired and of Austronesian stock. In August 2019, a Papuan student who participated in anti-racism protests at Jayapura was interrogated and beaten by police officers while his dreadlocks were forcibly cut off.

=== Jamaica ===
Along with the United States and other Caribbean islands, Jamaica also served as a hub where slaves were transported from Africa during the trans-Atlantic slave trade. In Jamaica specifically, skin bleaching is common practice used to combat societal views on beauty. Colorism plays as the main factor in this dangerous practice, and has expanded into textureism and other forms of discrimination in Jamaica. In 2018, a five-year-old girl was banned from attending classes at her primary school in Kingston, Jamaica, for having dreadlocks.

=== Somalia ===
During the Indian Ocean slave trade, many Bantus were captured in Tanzania and brought to work as slaves in Somalia. The Bantus are phenotypically, linguistically and culturally distinct from the ethnic Somalis of Somalia and were discriminated based on this and still are to this day. The Bantus brought there, who are now called Somali Bantus, were called "Jareer" by the ethnic Somalis which is a derogatory word meaning kinky-haired.

== See also ==
- Beard and haircut laws by country
- Black is Beautiful
- Blonde stereotype
- Blonde versus brunette rivalry
- Colorism
- Discrimination against people with red hair
- Good hair (phrase)
- Hair Love
- Internalized racism
- List of hairstyles
- Paper bag party
- Prejudice and discrimination against redheads

== Bibliography ==
- "Black Women and Identity: What's Hair Got To Do With It?" vol. 22, no. 1, fall 2008–2009
- "Dreadlock Discrimination: Is There Such A Thing?" AOL Jobs. N.p., n.d. Web. 29 Apr. 2013.
- ""Dreadlock Discrimination" Triggers Lawsuit." Racial Discrimination Based On A Hairstyle? N.p., n.d. Web. 30 Apr. 2013.
- "For African-American Women, a Hairstyle Can Be a Tricky Decision." SaportaReport. N.p., n.d. Web. 29 Apr. 2013.
- "Good Hair (film)." Wikipedia. Wikimedia Foundation, 28 Apr. 2013. Web. 30 Apr. 2013.
- "Willis Mason. History of the American People. Boston: Allyn and Bacon, 1922. Print.
- Byrd, A. D., & Tharps, L. L. (2001). Hair story: Untangling the roots of black hair in America. St. Martin's Press.
- Johnson, E. (2020). Resistance and empowerment in black women's hair styling. Routledge.
- Kelly, M. D., & Bailey, S. R. (2017). Racial inequality and the recognition of racial discrimination in Jamaica. Social Identities, 24(6), 688–706. https://doi.org/10.1080/13504630.2017.1381835
- Dabiri, E. (2019). Don't Touch My Hair. Penguin
