= Natural hair movement =

Movement for people of sub-Saharan African descent

The natural hair movement is a social and cultural movement advocating for the embrace and unmanipulated presentation of textured hair. Within the movement, "natural hair" is defined as hair worn in its inherent state without chemical relaxers or permanent heat-straightening, encompassing a wide spectrum of natural textures—including waves, curls, and kinks spanning various curl typologies (such as types 3A through 4C) and mixed hair types.

While particularly prominent in the United States, the movement is not restricted to any single geographic area, resonating globally across the African diaspora and international communities. Tracing its origins to the Black pride and civil rights activism of the 1960s, the movement experienced a major digital and cultural resurgence in the 2000s.

Although the cultural terminology is primarily associated with kinky hair, scholars and participants emphasize that the movement's principles of bodily autonomy, anti-discrimination advocacy in professional environments, and the destigmatization of unmanipulated textures apply broadly to diverse hair types and heritages worldwide.

== Definition and features ==
While rooted historically in the African diaspora, the natural hair movement encompasses individuals of diverse backgrounds who choose to wear their hair in its inherent textured state—including kinky, coiled, and tight curly patterns—rather than utilizing chemical relaxers to straighten it. Chemical relaxation alters the hair's protein structure and can be performed professionally or via commercial at-home kits.

Styling practices within the movement are varied and may include hair twists, braids, or locs. Furthermore, participation in the movement does not necessitate a rigid product regimen, the complete avoidance of temporary non-chemical styling methods, or alignment with a specific political ideology.

A significant aspect of the movement involves the cultural reclamation of language. The term "nappy," historically weaponized as a derogatory descriptor for the hair of Black individuals—with roots tracing to the Atlantic slave trade and pejorative comparisons to cotton—has been positively reappropriated by Afrodescendants. In Francophone regions, the word "nappy" is frequently used as a portmanteau of "natural" and "happy" to denote texture acceptance.

== History ==
In many early African societies, hairdressing historically served as a core cultural practice that extended beyond aesthetics. Hairstyles functioned as a form of social communication, following codes that signal ethnic identity, age, marital status and social rank. Scholars emphasize that Black hair has long been a site of creativity and cultural production that reflect shared histories.

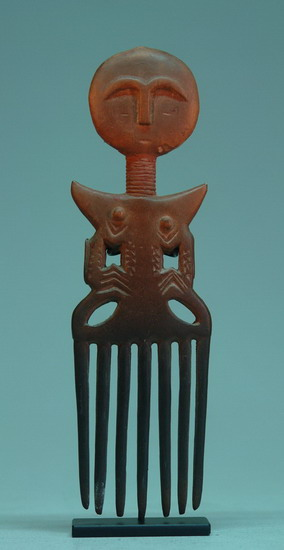
An Ashanti African comb (Ghana).

However, during the Atlantic slave trade, the conditions of servitude did not allow black people to take care of their hair. Enslaved Africans had been stripped of the tools and autonomy necessary to maintain their practices. Under slavery, kinky hair was devalued and branded, with terms like "nappy" appearing as racialized insults. In many cases, their heads were shaved upon capture or arrival, symbolizing the loss of identity and connection to the motherland. This process was part of a broader system of cultural erasure that sought to suppress African identities. Following the American abolition of slavery in 1865, Black Americans began to navigate a society that was rooted in Eurocentric beauty standards. Hair straightening became widely popular as Black women used it to improve access to employment and social mobility. Tools such as the hot comb, and later Garrett A. Morgan's invention of a relaxer cream in 1909, were used to alter hair texture to conform to the dominate ideals of professionalism.

In the 1960s, as racial segregation between blacks and whites reigned in the United States, there was a significant shift in the cultural and political meaning of Black Hair. During the Civil Rights and Black Power movement, natural hairstyles such as the Afro hairstyle, became symbols of resistance, pride and self-definition. The Afro hairstyle also became closely associated with the "Black is Beautiful" movement, which sought to redefine beauty standards and celebrate African Heritage. Figures such as Angela Davis, young human rights activist and member of the 1966 revolutionary movement Black Panthers, popularized the look, transforming it into a visible marker of political identity. It was adopted by multiple celebrities, such as Diana Ross and the Jackson 5 band members. Scholars describe this shift as part of a broader "politics of style," where hair and fashion functioned as a tool of activism that allowed African Americans to assert agency and challenge dominant norms. At the same time, these developments were shaped by broader processes of globalization and African Diaspora. Natural hairstyles became part of a transnational cultural movement, often referred to as "soul style," which circulated across national boundaries and expressed a shared sense of identity and resistance. Individuals across the African diaspora used natural hairstyles to align themselves with anti-colonial struggles, civil rights and broader efforts to challenge racial hierarchies. Historians argue hair became part of a shared cultural language through which people expressed both local identities and shared histories.

During the 1970s–1980s, popularized especially by some celebrities, the "Jheri curl," a newer technique to loosen tightly curled hair, became fashionable in the African American community; it can be seen in Michael Jackson's hair in the music video of his song Thriller. The popularity of the "Jheri curl," reflected the growing influence of mass media and consumerism that shaped beauty standards. While the Jheri curl was often celebrated as a modern and stylish look, it relied on chemical processing, which reinforced earlier pressures to alter natural hair. In contrast, during these same years, dreadlocks were also introduced into popular culture and popularized through reggae music, especially by Bob Marley's hair style and by the Rastafarian movement. This hairstyle became frequently associated with resistance, spirituality, and anti-colonial identity, particularly through their connection to Rastafarian beliefs and Pan-African ideology. As music, film, and fashion industries expanded internationally, this visibility made natural hair more susceptible to commodification. Scholars point out that Black hair has often been shaped and influenced by capitalism, as the beauty industry began to monopolize on natural hair the political movement got repurposed for commercial gain.

Hair straightening was considered mainstream and performed frequently throughout the 1980s and 1990s, often with relaxers containing harsh chemicals, particularly lye, that can cause harmful effects on the scalp like red patches, burns, and alopecia.

== Present day ==
=== Internet presence ===
Since the emergence of Web 2.0, a growing number of creators have been sharing their beauty advice via:

- Blogs: Black Girl Long Hair, Naturally Curly, Curly Nikki, Hair Lista, Afrobella, Un-ruly.com in the US; Black Beauty Bag, Afrobelle, Ivy-Mag in France
- Web-zines: Naturally Happy Hair in the US; FashizBlack, Afrosomething in France; Afro Style Magazine in the Netherlands

These websites have expanded the natural hair movement around the world so as to highlight the beauty of natural hair.

=== Events and festivals ===
In 2014 The Curly Girl Collective held their first CurlFest, a festival now held annually in Brooklyn, New York, that celebrates natural hair. Outside the US, several events have developed to accompany the natural hair movement, particularly in France and in Africa:

- The salon Boucles d'ébène: A demonstration, has existed for ten years, dedicated to the black hairdressing and beauty.
- The Miss Nappy Paris′ competition: The election of "Miss Nappy" so as to promote the Afro hair beauty.
- The Massalia Nappy Days: Lectures, projections of documentaries and fashion shows.
- The Crépue d'ébène Festival at Abidjan (Ivory Coast): Dedicated to the natural beauty of the African woman and to the highlighting of the nappy hair.
- The Natural Hair Academy: Event to better understand the nappy hair, days of advice by speakers.
- The AfricaParis Festival: Dedicated to the "Afropean" culture.

=== Presence in feminist culture ===
Each woman has her own reason to retrieve her authenticity; some want to preserve their hair against aggressive hair styling methods such as weaves being too tight or harmful straightening chemical products, while others simply prefer their natural hair in spite of the pressure from the dominant aesthetics.

The natural hair movement has been encouraged by some female stars who have abandoned straightening, allowing their natural hair to make a comeback, such as Erykah Badu, Lupita Nyong'o, Solange Knowles, Janelle Monáe, and Viola Davis.

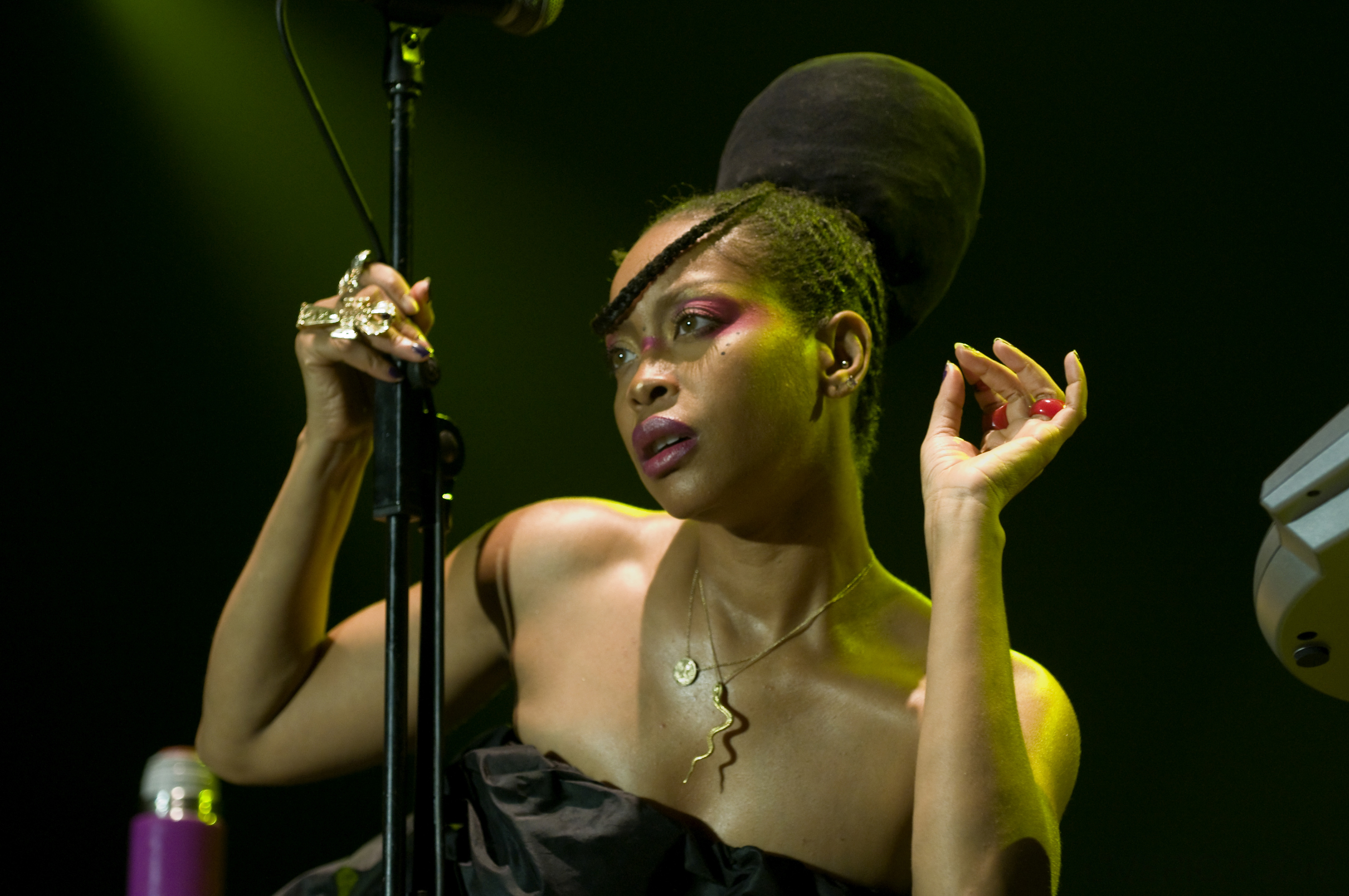
Erykah Badu at a concert in July 2008.
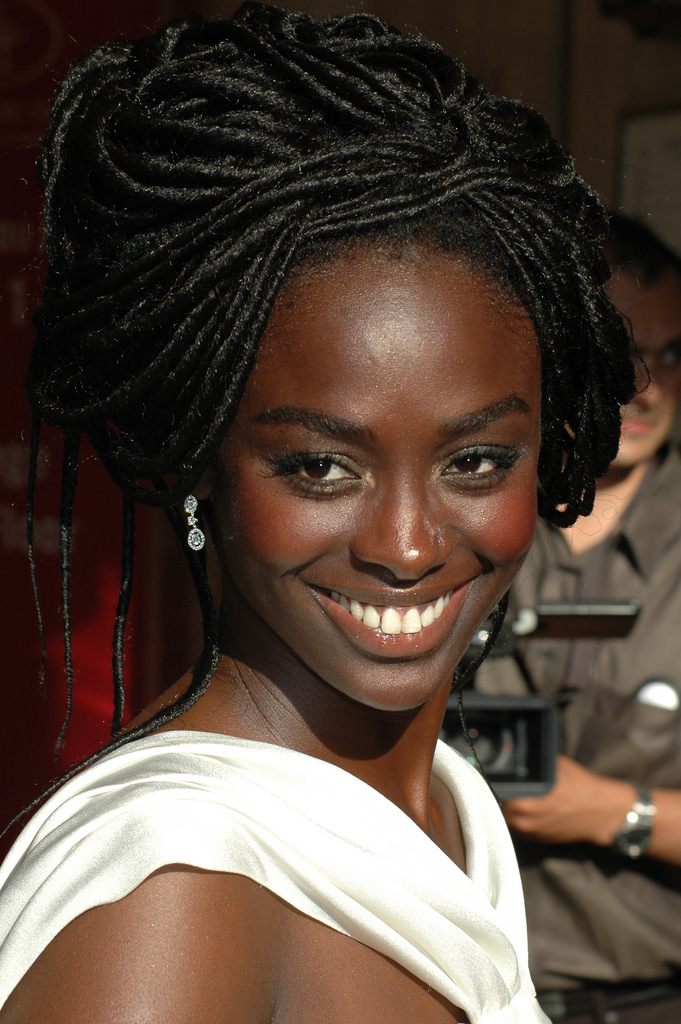
Aïssa Maïga during the 2007 Cannes Film Festival.

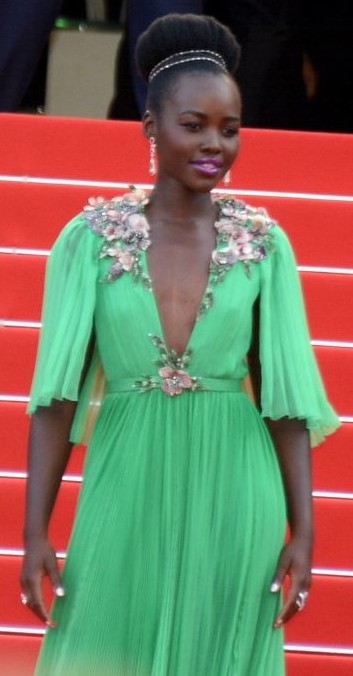
Lupita Nyong'o at the 2015 Cannes Film Festival.

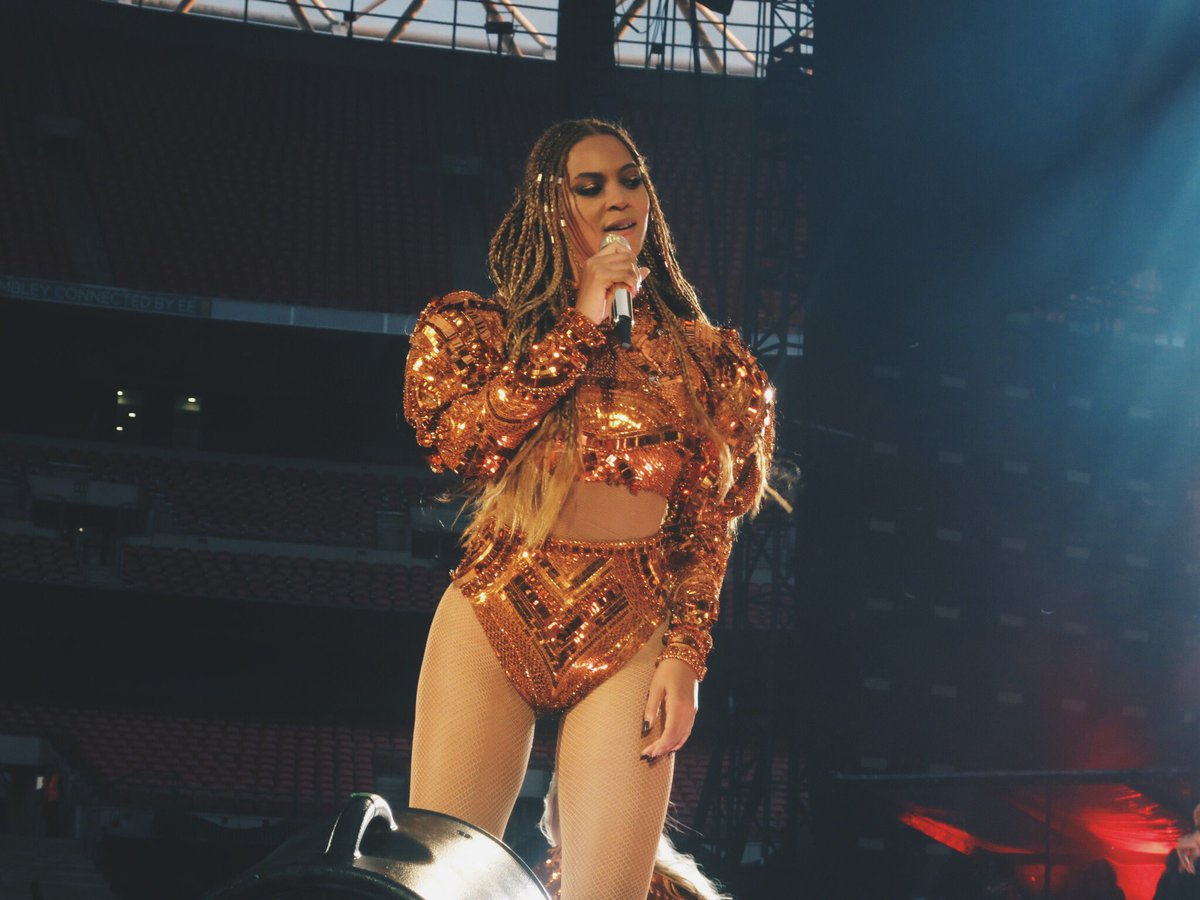
Beyoncé sporting braids during the Formation world tour.

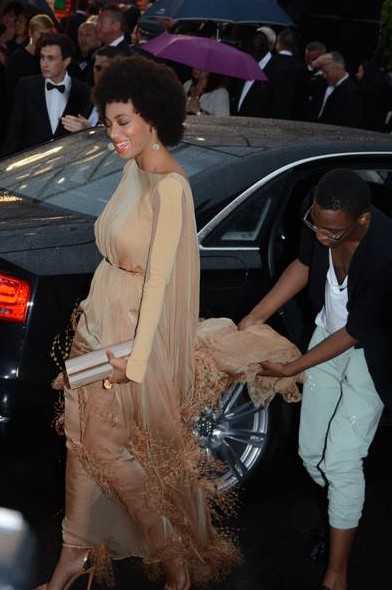
Solange Knowles at the 2013 Cannes Film Festival.

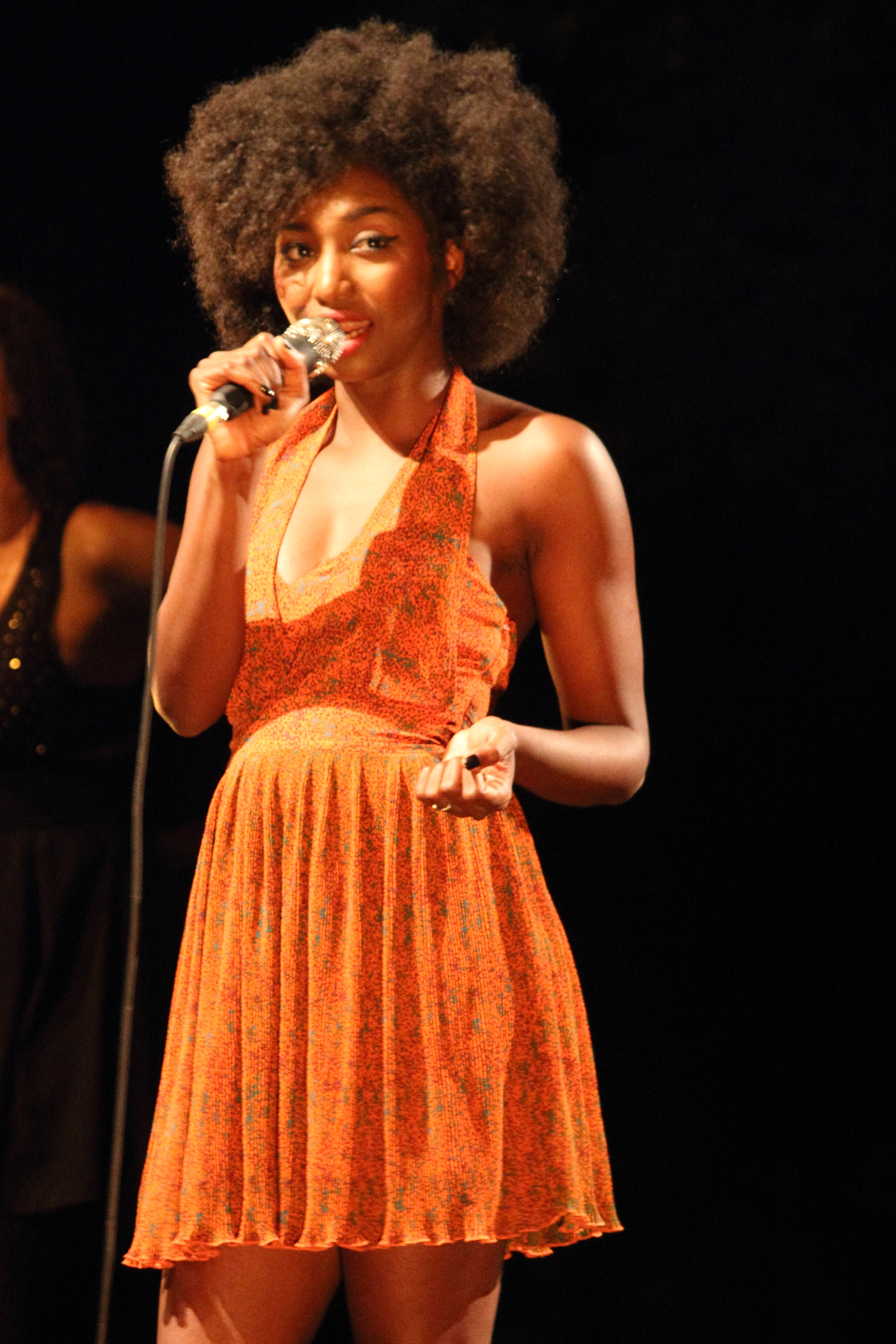
Inna Modja during a concert at Vaux-sur-Mer 9 August 2012.

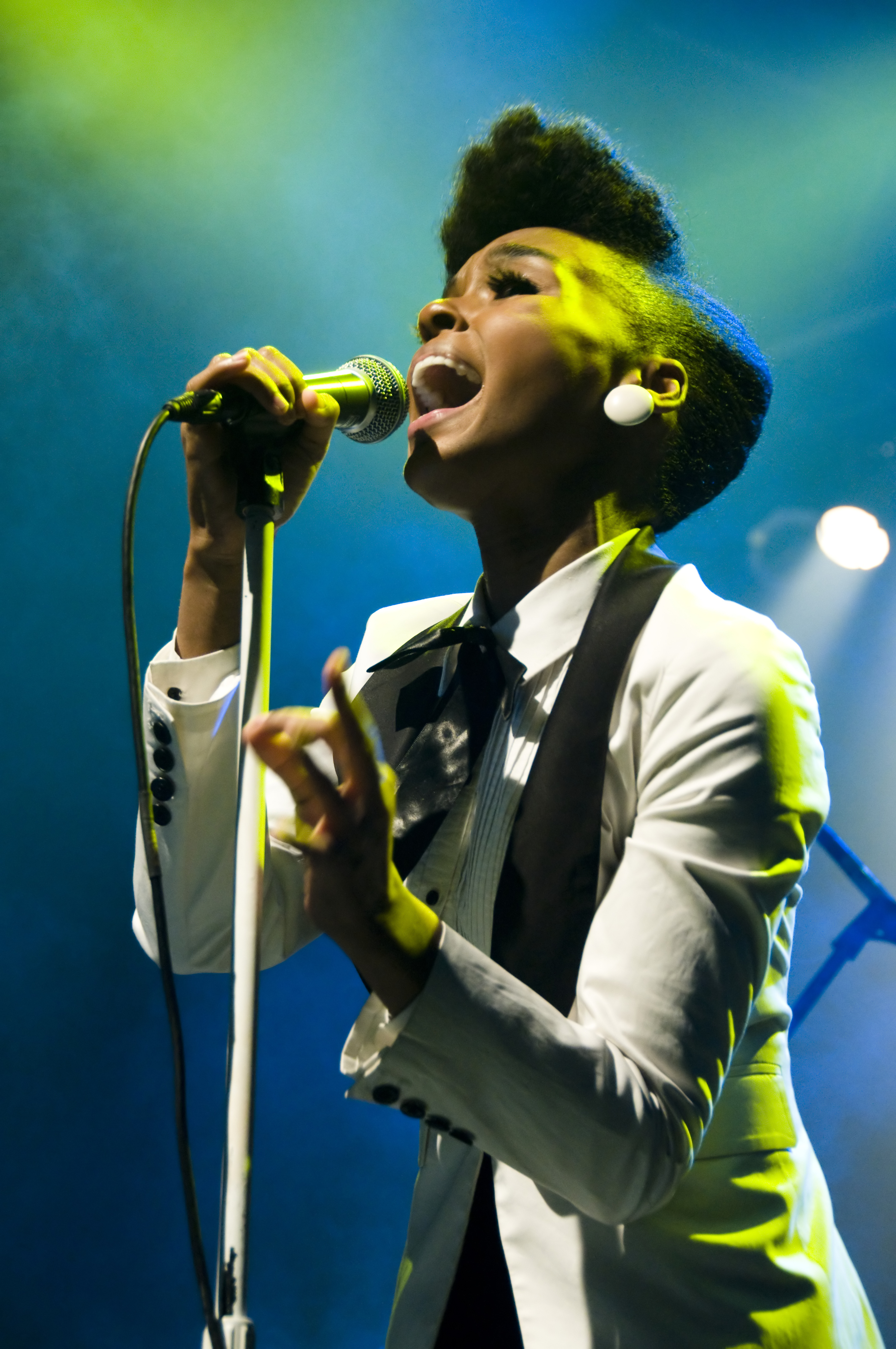
Janelle Monáe sang live at the Austin Music Hall on the occasion of SXSW in March 2009.

== Legal issues ==
On 3 July 2019, California became the first US state to prohibit discrimination over natural hair. Governor Gavin Newsom signed the CROWN Act into law, banning employers and schools from discriminating against hairstyles such as afros, braids, twists, and dreadlocks. Likewise, later in 2019 Assembly Bill 07797 became law in New York state; it "prohibits race discrimination based on natural hair or hairstyles."

== "Ethnic" hair care industry ==
With the popularity of "going natural", hair care suppliers have seen a rapid decrease in the purchase of relaxers, the harsh chemical hair straightener. An industry that was once worth an estimated $774 million, relaxer sales have gone down 26% over the last five years, as of 2013 reports. Relaxer sales had fallen by 38% between 2012 and 2017 and were estimated to decrease to 45% by 2019.

Women who wear their hair natural are now spending more money on chemical-free products that highlight the best results for their natural textures. Hair care suppliers and markets are taking note, as Black consumers represent a lucrative segment for the hair care industry, prompting brands to adjust their product lines to meet this growing demand. However, many products that appear to cater to Black consumers, and may be perceived as Black-owned, are in fact owned by large corporations. This has prompted increased awareness and consumer scrutiny, as highlighted by reports identifying and listing non-Black-owned brands that consumers may have previously assumed were Black-owned.

As relaxer production declines in favor of more natural-friendly products, Black consumers increasingly rely on social media—particularly YouTube—for tutorials, product demonstrations, and reviews before making purchases. Popular brands and products include Shea Moisture, DevaCurl, and Carol's Daughter. The availability of products suited for natural Black hair has also been encouraged by the founding of Black-owned hair product companies, such as Ruka Hair in the UK, founded by Tendai Moyo.

== Objections and opposition ==
Many women of African descent have faced opposition from wearing their hair in naturally curly styles or other non-straight, protective styles.

Many women have found that they are treated unjustly based on having naturally afro-textured hair. Natural hair can be deemed "unprofessional", turning it into a fireable offense. For example, a 12-year-old student at a Florida Christian school with natural hair "was given one week to decide whether to cut her hair or leave the academy that she has attended since third grade" after she complained to school officials about being bullied by other students. In March 2014, the United States Department of Defense issued a set of guidelines that banned all afros, dreadlocks, braids, and twists that were greater than 1/4" in diameter. Guidelines such as these clearly disproportionately affect and target those of African descent. They later rolled back the guidelines that same year in August by allowing two-strand twists. The Army increased the size of permissible braids and removed the word "unkempt" from their guidelines. In April 2016, a female Zara employee in the Canadian city of Toronto was reprimanded for wearing her hair in a braided hairstyle, which resulted in her filing a complaint with the Ontario Human Rights Commission. Hair appropriation/cultural appropriation has been an issue within the natural hair community. Many non-black individuals, especially celebrities, often wear African-American hairstyles, which some have found offensive. Giuliana Rancic apologized to actress Zendaya—who wore dreadlocks on the 2015 Oscar's red carpet—after commenting that Zendaya's hair must have smelled of "patchouli oil or weed".

Kim Kardashian wore Fulani braids, originating from the Fulani tribe of West Africa, on three different occasions in 2018. She referred to them as "Bo Derek braids" in reference to actress Bo Derek's Fulani braids in the 1979 film 10. Kardashian received backlash, especially from the black community. The idea of non-black women wearing natural hair styles remains controversial.

== Terminology ==
Several words are frequently used in the vocabulary of the natural hair movement:

- Afro: A hairstyle created by combing the hair away from the scalp, allowing the hair to extend out from the head in a large, rounded-shape, much like a cloud or ball.
- Bantu knot: Hairstyle that consists of twisted hair rolled up into small buns. See Jada Pinkett Smith as Niobe in The Matrix series.
- Big chop: Cutting one's chemically straightened hair to let it grow in its natural texture.
- Braids: Hairstyle where hair is braided with extensions or with natural hair.
- Box braids: A form of protective styling done through braiding synthetic hair along with real hair. This promotes hair growth and protects hair from breakage and other damaging factors.
- Braid out: Braids are unraveled.
- Creamy crack: Chemical relaxers. The term was coined with the thought that the use of relaxers is addictive for those women who strive for a permanently straight hair texture.
- Coils: A hairstyle achieved by taking small sections of wet or very damp hair and smoothing, while rotating the sections, one by one, from root to tip. Tiny styling combs or a finger are typically used.
- Coily: The texture characteristic of natural Type 4 hair, whereby the configuration of the strand resembles a small-diameter ink pen spring.
- Cornrows: A style of braiding/plaiting hair into narrow strips to form geometric patterns on the scalp. A form of protective styling.
- Co-wash: Washing one's hair with conditioner instead of shampoo.
- Detangling: The process of using fingers or a wide-tooth comb to get out knots in curly textured hair.
- Dreadlocks: Matted or sculpted ropes of hair.
- Fro-hawk: Hairdressing similar to the mohawk hairstyle.
- Hair porosity: Natural hair can have low, high, or medium porosity. Low porosity hair cuticles are very tightly closed and do not absorb water or product easily. High porosity hair cuticles are very open and absorb water and product easily. Medium porosity is more balance and absorbs water, product, and moisture easily. In order to best treat naturally curly hair, celebrity hairstylist Andre Walker created a hair typing system. This categorizes hair into four categories based on how tight curls are coiled.
- Kinky hair:
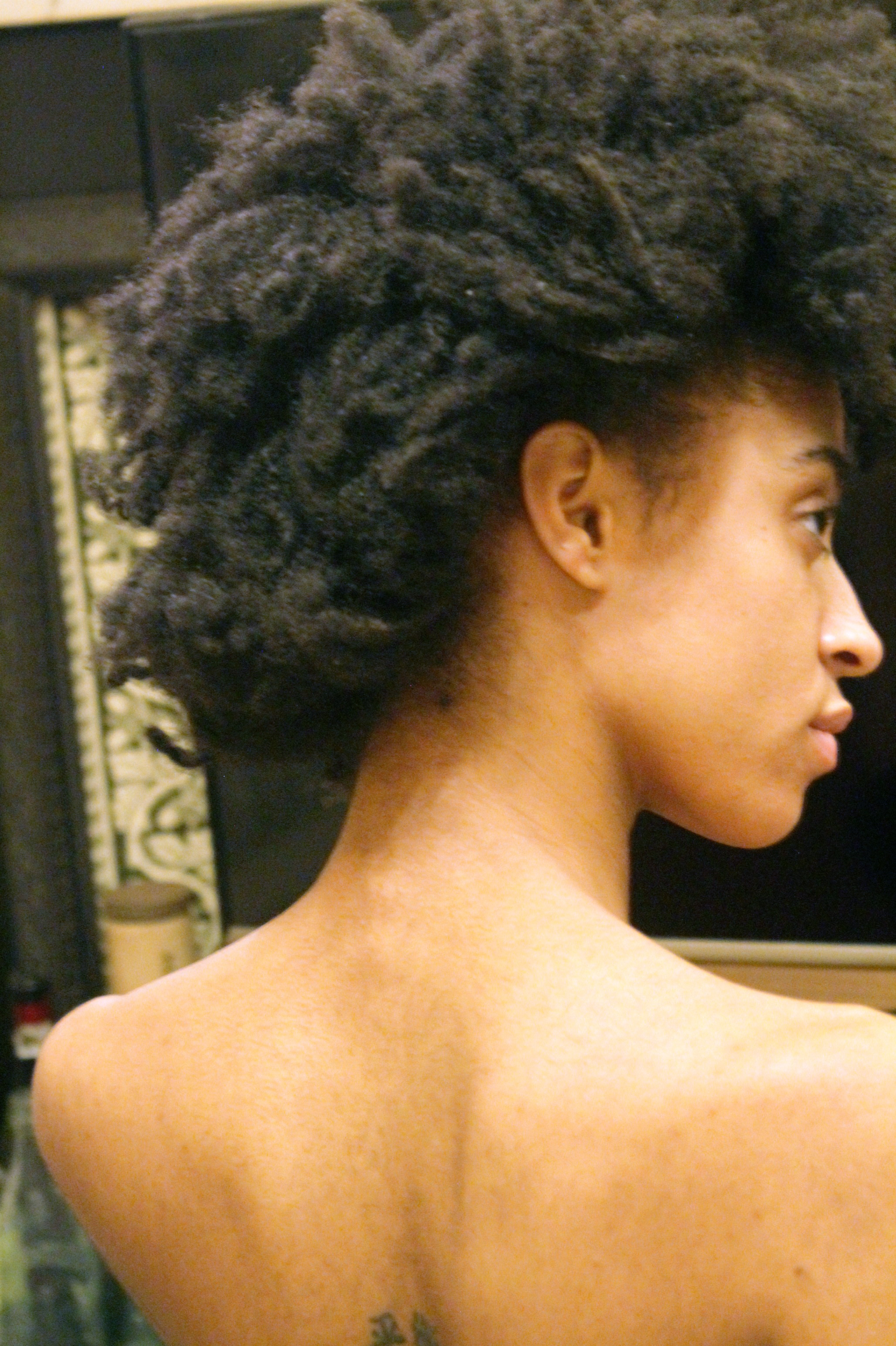
  Kinky hair is hair with tight curls, tight coils, or no defined curls.
  Tightly curled hair, tightly coiled hair or hair without defined curls.
- Protective hairstyle: Any coiffure configuration that keeps hair ends safely tucked away to keep the natural hair protected from the elements. These hairdos require very little daily upkeep and help strands stay moisturized. Includes braids, extensions, wigs, and weaves. See Janet Jackson in Poetic Justice.
- Senegalese twists: Also known as rope twists where synthetic hair is used and twisted in with the natural hair.
- Shrinkage: Because natural hair is typically has different types of curls and textures, in its natural state it appears shorter than it would straightened.
- Transition: Period of time when one is transitioning from straightening their hair with heat/and or chemical products to wearing hair in its natural state.
- Teeny Weeny Afro (TWA): Short Afro haircut. See Viola Davis in the film Suicide Squad.
- Twist out: Hairstyle where twists are unraveled. See Corinne Bailey Rae.
- Twists: Double strands of hair wrapped around each other.
- Wash and go: wash one's hair and going on about one's day. This means there is no drying or styling involved and the application of product is minimal (usually a moisturizer or anti-frizz serum). The wash and go is also sometimes referred to as the "shake and go" which further emphasizes the lack of actual styling involved. The goal of a wash and go is to define natural curls.

== Filmography ==
- Nappily Ever After, movie directed by Haifaa al-Mansour in 2018.
- Good Hair, movie directed by Jeff Stilson and produced by Chris Rock in 2009.
- My Nappy Roots: A Journey Through Black Hair-itage, movie directed and produced by Regina Kimbell in 2008.
- Bad Hair (2020 film)
- Hair Love, Oscar-winning short, created by Matthew A. Cherry

== See also ==
- Afro
- Afro-textured hair
- Afrocentrism
- Black is beautiful
- Discrimination based on hair texture
- Black Panthers
- Black feminism
- Blaxploitation
- Curly Girl Method
- Internalized racism
- Nappturality
- Postcolonialism
- List of hairstyles
