= CROWN Act of 2022 =

2022 Act of US Congress prohibiting hair discrimination

CROWN Act
- Long title: An Act to prohibit discrimination based on an individual's texture or style of hair.
- Announced in: the 117th United States Congress
- Number of co-sponsors: 116

Legislative history
- Introduced in the House of Representatives as H.R. 2116 by Bonnie Watson Coleman (D-NJ) on March 19, 2021; Committee consideration by House Judiciary; House Education and Labor; House Budget; Passed the House of Representatives on March 18, 2022 (235–189)

The Creating a Respectful and Open World for Natural Hair Act of 2022 (also known as the CROWN Act of 2022) was a bill in the United States Congress intended to prohibit discrimination based on an individual's hair type or hairstyle by classifying such discrimination illegal under federal law. It applied to federally assisted programs, housing programs, public accommodations, and employment. The act was introduced in the House of Representatives by Congresswoman Bonnie Watson Coleman (D-NJ) on March 19, 2021. Senator Cory Booker (D-NJ) introduced a companion bill in the Senate on March 22, 2021. The CROWN Act of 2022 marked the second time the legislation was introduced in Congress.

On March 18, 2022, the House of Representatives passed the bill with a 235-189 vote. In the Senate, the bill was referred to the Judiciary Committee, but was never officially voted on because it failed to gain enough support to override a filibuster from Senator Rand Paul (R-KY).

No new version of the bill has since been proposed in either the House of Representatives or Senate. However, Representative Troy Carter (D-LA) suggested the proposed legislation may be re-introduced in 2024.

== Origin ==
In 2019, Dove conducted the CROWN Research Study to "identify the magnitude of racial discrimination experienced by women in the workplace based on their natural hairstyles." The study was based on "a survey of 1,017 Black women and 1,050 non-Black women ages 25-64." The research found that "Black women are 30% more likely to be made aware of a formal workplace appearance policy," "83% more likely to report being judged more harshly on [their] looks than other women," and "1.5 times more likely to be sent home from the workplace because of their hair." These results led to Dove, Color of Change, the National Urban League, and the Western Center on Law & Poverty creating the CROWN Coalition.

In response to the gathered data, the CROWN Coalition partnered with then-California State Senator Holly J. Mitchell to introduce a bill to prohibit discrimination based on hairstyle and hair texture. The CROWN Act passed unanimously in both chambers of the California Legislature and was signed into law on July 3, 2019. The Act extended protection under the State's Fair Employment and Housing Act (FEHA) and the California Education Code, declaring it unlawful to discriminate against individuals who wear natural or protective hairstyles, including, but not limited to, braids, locs, and twists. It served as the first legislation passed at the state level in the United States to prohibit such discrimination, and largely inspired the proposed federal bill.

== Legislative history ==
On the federal level, the "Creating a Respectful and Open World for Natural Hair" Act ("CROWN Act") has been introduced to the United States Congress twice: first in the 116th Congress (2019–2020), and second in the 117th Congress (2021–2022).

=== 2019–2020 ===
==== Overview ====
The "Creating a Respectful and Open World for Natural Hair" Act was first introduced to the United States Congress on December 5, 2019. Known by the shortened name the "CROWN Act of 2020", the bill was proposed in the House of Representatives by former Representative Cedric Richmond (D-LA) for the purpose of prohibiting "discrimination based on an individual's texture or style of hair." Section 2 of the bill explained that people of African descent, particularly in employment and educational settings, routinely face discrimination due to their natural hair or protective hairstyles they are commonly adorned with, including hair that is tightly coiled or tightly curled, or worn in locs, cornrows, twists, braids, Bantu knots, or Afros. The bill clarified that such discrimination violates existing Federal law under the Civil Rights Act of 1964, section 1977 of the Revised Statutes, and the Fair Housing Act. The bill applied to federally funded programs and activities, housing programs, public accommodations, and employment.

When the bill was initially proposed in December 2019 it had 29 co-sponsors. It was then referred to two House Committees: (i) House Judiciary and (ii) House Education and Labor. By September 17, 2020, the bill had garnered 63 co-sponsors, all of whom were affiliated with the Democratic Party.

==== House Judiciary Committee Report ====
On September 21, 2020, both committees discharged the bill, and the House Judiciary Committee issued an accompanying 17-page Committee Report in favor of the bill.

In the Committee Report, the House Judiciary's Democratic majority put forth several reasons in favor of the CROWN Act of 2020, with one of the key reasons being the inconsistent rulings among federal courts on cases involving hair discrimination in the workplace. The majority referred to the 1976 case Jenkins v. Blue Cross Mutual Hospital Insurance, Inc., in which plaintiff-appellant Beverly Jenkins, an African American woman, filed suit under Title VII of the Civil Rights Act of 1964, claiming she was denied a promotion largely because of her Afro hairstyle. In Jenkins, the United States Court of Appeals for the Seventh Circuit concluded Title VII should be "construed and applied broadly," and thus discrimination based on a natural hairstyle may be a basis for unlawful racial discrimination under the statute. In the Report, the House Judiciary's majority explained that federal courts in other circuits have since adopted narrower interpretations of Title VII when deciding whether employer grooming policies that restrict certain hairstyles are unlawful. The majority referenced the 1981 case Rogers v. American Airlines, in which a federal district court concluded that a workplace grooming policy banning cornrow braids not pulled back in a bun or hair wrap was legally permissible. It also cited the 2016 case Equal Employment Opportunity Commission v. Catastrophe Management Solutions, where the Eleventh Circuit concluded that mutable hairstyles, such as dreadlocks, are not extended protection under Title VII.

The Committee majority further pointed out that the Equal Employment Opportunity Commission (EEOC) has since issued guidance on Title VII interpretation to prohibit discrimination based on hair texture and certain hairstyles. Moreover, it explained that seven states had already passed similar legislation to the CROWN Act of 2020 but noted that "such protections are incomplete and leave many minorities, especially Black Americans, vulnerable to discrimination."

Representative Jim Jordan (OH-R), expressed opposition for the proposed legislation on behalf of the House Judiciary's minority. He argued that the bill was a tactic for political messaging, and that it was not necessary since existing federal law already prohibits racial discrimination. Congressman Jordan also stated the Democratic majority did not follow proper protocol since the Committee had not held a legislative hearing on the bill before it was considered on the Floor.

==== Bill movement and status ====
On September 21, 2020, the House debated the bill for 40 minutes and passed the legislation via a voice vote. Though the CROWN Act of 2020 passed in the House, it was not enacted into law since the companion Senate legislation became stalled. Senator Cory Booker (D-NJ) had introduced an identical bill in the Senate on January 8, 2020. The proposed Act had 20 co-sponsors (19 Democrat; 1 Independent). It was read twice, referred to the Senate Judiciary Committee, but never voted on.

=== 2021–2022 ===
Congress	Short title	Bill number(s)	Date introduced	Sponsor(s)	# of cosponsors	Latest status
117th Congress	CROWN ACT of 2022.	H.R. 2116	March 19, 2021	Bonnie Watson Coleman (D-NJ)	116	Passed the House (235 -189).
117th Congress	CROWN ACT of 2022.	S.888	March 22, 2021	Cory Booker (D-NJ)	29	Referred to committees of judication.

==== Bill overview ====
On March 19, 2021, Congresswoman Bonnie Watson Coleman (D-NJ) introduced the "Creating a Respectful and Open World for Natural Hair" Act of 2021 ("CROWN Act of 2021") in the House of Representatives. The purpose, extent, and text of the bill reflected the Act previously proposed in 2019. When the CROWN Act of 2021 was first introduced, it had 30 original co-sponsors but eventually garnered a total of 116 (115 Democrat; 1 Republican). The bill was referred to three House Committees: (i) House Judiciary; (ii) House Education and Labor; and (iii) House Budget. The House Judiciary Committee subsequently referred the bill to the Subcommittee on the Constitution, Civil Rights, and Civil Liberties.

==== House Judiciary Committee Report ====
On February 25, 2022, the House Judiciary Committee issued a 27-page Committee Report in favor of the bill.

The Committee Report largely mirrored the Report issued for the CROWN Act of 2020. The main addition was that the House Judiciary's Majority addressed the Minority's previous comment about proper protocol not being followed. The Majority noted the legislative hearing the Subcommittee on the Constitution, Civil Rights, and Civil Liberties had held in relation to the bill where multiple witnesses testified, thereby it satisfied requirements. In the Conclusion, the Majority explained that although even more states (14 total) had enacted legislation to prohibit hair discrimination since the bill was first proposed, a federal Act was still needed to ensure protection nationwide.

Like in the 2020 Committee Report, Representative Jim Jordan (OH-R), expressed opposition for the bill on behalf of the House Judiciary's Minority. He argued that "a race-neutral policy is not disparate treatment simply because it is applied to a member of a protected class," and that the bill was overall "unnecessary as a matter of law."

==== Bill movement and status ====
On February 28, 2022, the House proceeded with forty minutes of debate and voted via roll-call. The 235-188 vote failed to achieve the two-thirds majority needed for passage. Of the 235 representatives who voted "yes", 220 were Democrat and 15 were Republican. Ten representatives abstained from voting: two were Democrats (Representatives Mark Pocan from Wisconsin and Terri Sewell from Alabama) and eight Republican.

The House passed a resolution to reconsider the proposed Act via one hour of debate on March 18, 2022. Shortly thereafter, the bill passed the House with bi-partisan support by a 235-189 vote. Of the 235 "yea" votes, 221 were Democrat and 14 were Republican. The 189 representatives who voted "nay" were all Republican. Eight representatives abstained from voting, all of whom belonged to the Republican Party. Both Democratic Representatives Mark Pocan (D-WI) and Terri Sewell (D-AL), who had previously voted "nay", voted for the bill's passage. When the legislation passed in the House, its name became updated to "Creating a Respectful and Open World for Natural Hair Act of 2022" ("CROWN Act of 2022" for short).

In the Senate, Senator Cory Booker (D-NJ) introduced a companion "CROWN Act" bill on March 22, 2021. It had 29 co-sponsors (27 Democrats; 1 Republican; 1 Independent). The bill was read twice, then referred to the Senate Judiciary Committee. In early December 2022, the proposed legislation failed to gain enough support to override a filibuster from Senator Rand Paul (R-KY), which prevented a vote from being conducted. Subsequently, on December 15, 2022, 30 members from the Congressional Black Caucus wrote a letter to Senate Majority Leader Chuck Schumer and Minority Leader Mitch McConnell to urge them to prioritize the bill as end-of-year legislation for the 117th Congress. The letter emphasized that the CROWN Act had achieved bipartisanship in both the House of Representatives and the Senate and was also supported by the Biden Administration. The Senate never voted on the bill before the Congressional session concluded.

The CROWN Act has not been re-introduced in the 118th Congress (2023–2024). However, Congressman Troy Carter (D-LA) suggested the proposed legislation may be re-introduced in 2024.

== State and local government legislative action ==
Map of US states that have passed laws prohibiting hair discrimination as of 2024

The CROWN Act, or similar legislation that prohibits discrimination based on an individual's hair texture or hairstyle, has been passed in 25 states, including: Alaska, Arizona, Arkansas, California, Colorado, Connecticut, Delaware, Illinois, Louisiana, Maine, Maryland, Massachusetts, Michigan, Minnesota, Nebraska, Nevada, New Jersey, New Mexico, New York, Oregon, Tennessee, Texas, Virginia, Vermont and Washington.

The extent of protection provided by the enacted state laws depends on the jurisdiction. For example, some states added "natural or protective hairstyles" to the definition of race in its state laws, and expressly listed specific hairstyles, such as braids, curls, dreadlocks, twists, and Bantu knots, as protected. Some states also intended for the legislation to apply broadly, extending protection across state-assisted housing programs, public accommodations, and employment, while other states enacted more restrictive laws that apply only to employment or educational settings.

Of the 25 states which have not enacted the CROWN Act, many have proposed such bills. Similar ordinances have also been passed at the municipal level across various cities and counties in effort to garner bi-partisan support for the proposed state laws.
