= Hair straightening =

Hair styling technique

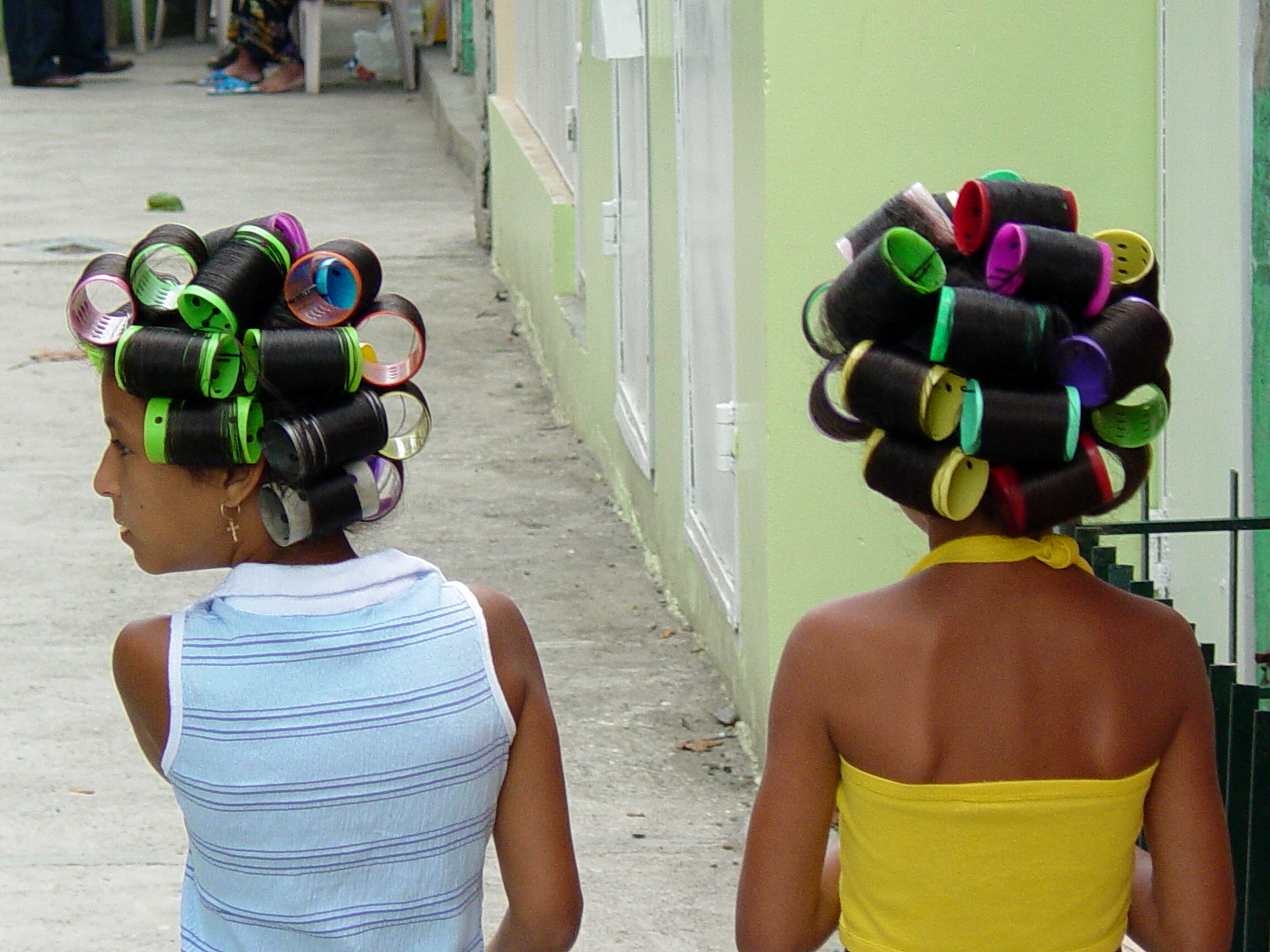
Large rollers can be used to straighten curly hair

Hair straightening is a hair styling technique involving the flattening and straightening of hair in order to give it a smooth, streamlined, and sleek appearance. It became very popular during the 1950s among black men and among women of all races. It is accomplished using a hair iron or hot comb, chemical relaxers, Japanese hair straightening, Brazilian hair straightening, or roller set/blowdryer styling. In addition, some shampoos, conditioners, and hair gels can help to make hair temporarily straight.

The process is often called "rebonding" in some countries from Southeast Asia (e.g. Indonesia, Singapore, Malaysia and Philippines). If done often, flat irons and chemicals can be damaging to hair. Excessive straightening often results in split ends. However, heat protectant sprays can decrease the damage.

== Methods ==
=== Temporary (non-chemical) ===
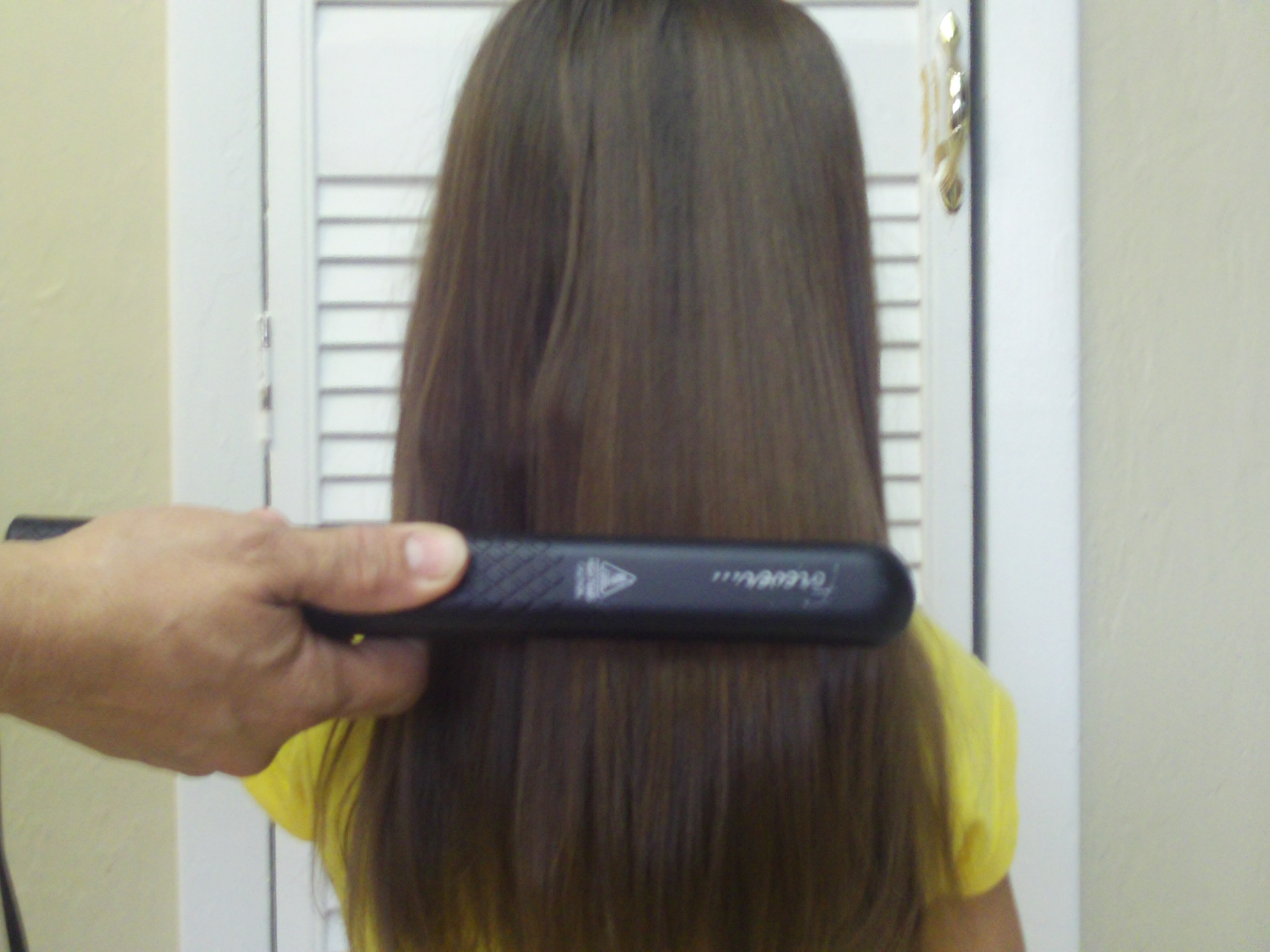
Hair being straightened with a hair iron.

Hair irons and hot combs used appropriately temporarily modify the shape and texture of hair. The hair will tend to revert to its original form due to environmental factors, mainly contact with water from washing, rain, humidity, etc. This includes water in styling products such as gels applied after straightening, although careful use of such treatments can produce usable results.

Use of too much heat, or for too long, can cause heat damage, irreversibly altering the hair's structure. Use of protective sprays or lotions before heat styling may help to prevent heat damage. While the damage cannot be reversed, it can be disguised using various styling techniques. Only cutting off and regrowing damaged hair removes the damage.

There are five principal tools used for hair straightening without chemical treatment:

- Straightening comb (also known as a hot comb) which applies heat to the hair.
- Hair irons (flat iron) apply heat directly to hair. For shorter hair, a flat iron with heating plates that are around 0.5 to 1 inch wide are used. Wider hair irons are used for longer hair.
- Blow dryer with a comb attachment or round brush to straighten hair. Too much heat can cause damage to the hair; a low to medium heat level protects it and the scalp. Adding some rinse-free or leave-in hair conditioner could help moisturizing hair while using a blow dryer to heat.
- Large hair rollers can be used on damp hair to stretch and straighten the hair as it dries. Often large rollers are used before blow-drying to minimize heat damage.
- Electrically heated hair straightening brushes produce heat that is absorbed by the hair by steadily brushing it. The hair must penetrate deep into the brush for maximum effect.

A popular temporary straightening method is the Dominican blowout which originated in the Dominican Republic. The technique spread to the United States where it was popularized by Dominican stylists. The Dominican blowout allows highly-textured and tightly-curled hair types to be straightened without the use of chemicals. It has become popular, particularly among African Americans, as an alternative to permanent hair straightening or as a method of straightening the hair between relaxers.

=== Permanent (chemical) ===
Relaxers and the other methods permanently alter the structure of the hair, although new hair growth is not affected. The drug interferon alpha has been reported as being shown to modify hair follicles causing permanent change in a person's hair texture. Chemical hair straightening uses chemical substances to break disulfide bonds, also called an S-S bond or disulfide bridge, in the hair shaft.

There are several ways of permanently straightening hair. The main methods used today are:

- Keratin/Brazilian treatment - In this treatment a layer of keratin is added to the hair, followed by a hot flat iron. The keratin treatment is considered safe for hair since it uses the natural protein found in the hair shafts and is suitable for most hair conditions. The treatment straightens the hair, reduces frizz and adds a shine. The results last approximately 6 months and gradually returns to the original texture.
- Japanese/thermal reconditioning/yuko/rebonding - a non-coating treatment that loosens the cysteine bonds in the hair by application of a chemical for 15-20 minutes, and then a heat is applied to restructure the bonds into a straight type.
- Relaxers/chemical straightening - Chemical relaxers break hair’s disulfide bonds. Lye relaxers contain sodium hydroxide, while non-lye relaxers contain calcium hydroxide and can be used on more sensitive scalps.

Comparison of the permanent hair straightening treatments:
	Keratin/Brazilian treatment	Japanese/Thermal treatment	Chemical straightening/ hair relaxing treatment
method	keratin layer + flat ironing	bond breaking chemical + heat + neutralising chemical	hydroxide substance to break the disulfide bonds
texture & appearance	soft, silky, shiny, easy to manage. Lasts 2-6 months.	silky straight hair. Permanent.	soft, straight, easy to manage. Permanent.
suitable for	all hair types, damaged and previously treated	hair that has not been treated with chemicals before; loose to medium curls	coarse, tight curls
safety concerns	emits gases, not recommended while pregnant; protection for skin and eyes is required	damage from long exposure to heat; might cause scalp irritation and hair loss	chemical burns; hair breakage
duration of treatment	2-4 hours	4-8 hours	varies
recommended hair care	no washing, ponytails, or clips for 3 days; using Sodium chloride free shampoo and conditioner; Keratin shampoo	no washing for 3 days; use moisturizer and sun protection; wait 1-2 months until dyeing the hair	deep conditioning

==== Cancer risk ====
Relaxers can contain carcinogens such as formaldehyde-releasing agents, phthalates, and other endocrine-disrupting compounds, according to National Institutes of Health studies. The compounds can mimic the body's hormones, and studies have found them to be linked to breast, uterine, and ovarian cancers. For example, a 2017 study found that women who used chemical relaxers were nearly twice as likely to develop breast cancer as those who did not.

== Afro-textured hair ==
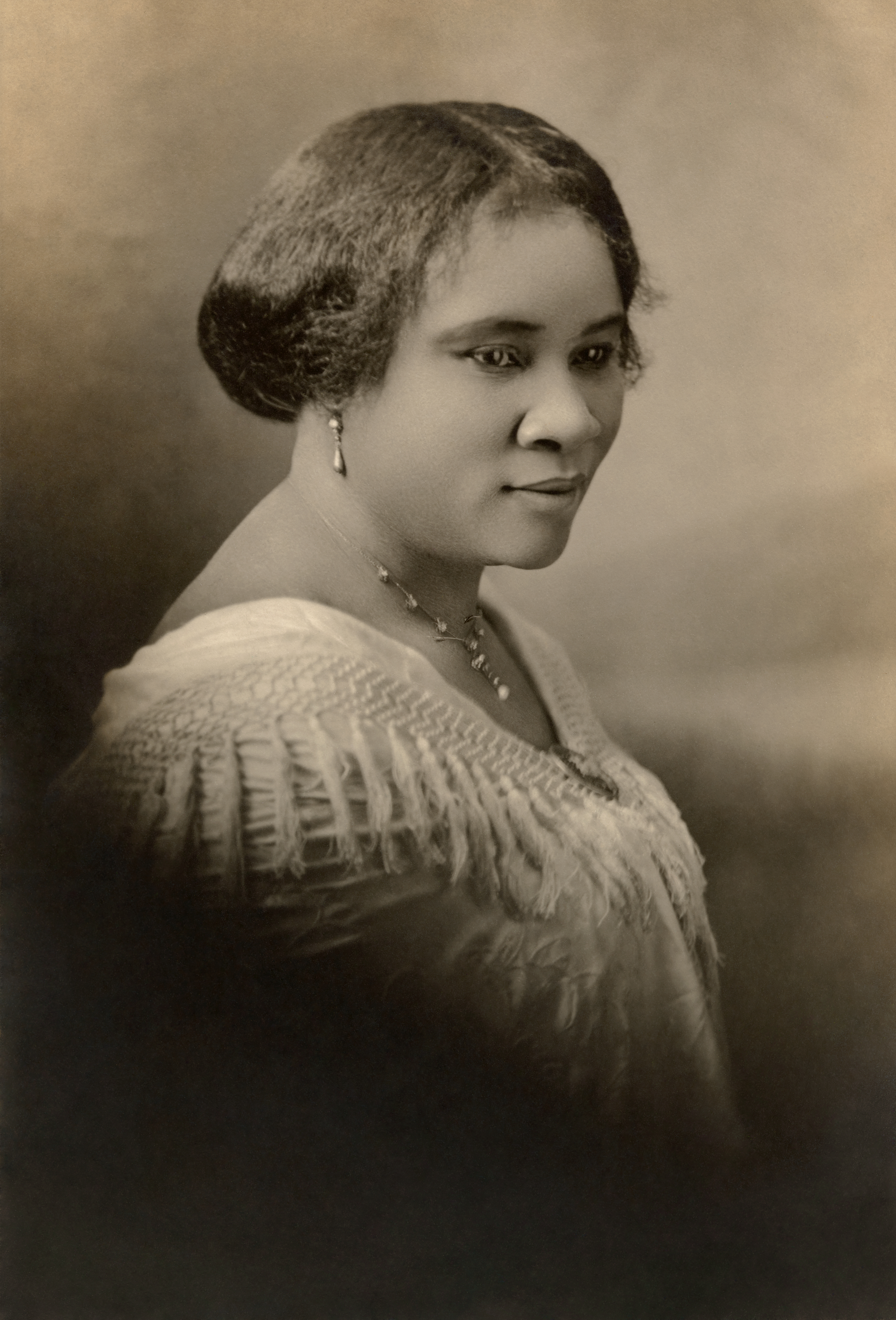
Madam C. J. Walker (1867–1919), popularizer of the straightening comb

Hair straightening using a hot comb or relaxer has a long history among women and men of African American descent, reflected in the huge commercial success of the straightening comb popularized by Madam C. J. Walker and other hairdressers in the early 1900s. The Madam Walker System of Beauty Culture focused more on hygiene and healthy scalps and hair than hair straightening. Her vegetable shampoo and Madam Walker's Wonderful Hair Grower (an ointment that contained sulfur) were designed to heal dandruff and severe scalp infections that were very common during a time when most Americans lacked indoor plumbing, electricity and central heating. Walker did not invent the hot comb, which was commercially available in Europe and America as early as the 1870s. While the practice has at times been a controversial issue in discussions of racial identity, visits to the hair salon have become embedded in black culture, fulfilling an important social role especially for women.

== See also ==
- Conk
- Jheri curl
- List of hairstyles
- Natural hair movement
- Silk press
