= CROWN Act (California) =

California law prohibiting discrimination based on hair style and hair texture

California State Legislature
- Long title: Create a Respectful and Open Workplace for Natural Hair Act; An act to amend Section 212.1 of the Education Code, and to amend Section 12926 of the Government Code, relating to discrimination.
- Enacted by: California State Senate
- Enacted: June 27, 2019
- Signed by: Gavin Newsom
- Signed: July 3, 2019
- Introduced by: Author: Holly Mitchell (D-Los Angeles); Co-authors: Rob Bonta (A) , Anna Caballero (S) , Cooper (A) , Robert Hertzberg (S) , Sydney Kamlager-Dove (A) , Kevin McCarty (A) , Shirley Weber (A)
- Status: Current legislation

The CROWN (Create a Respectful and Open Workplace for Natural Hair) Act (SB 188) is a California law which prohibits discrimination based on hair style and hair type by extending protection under the FEHA and the California Education Code. It is the first legislation passed at the state level in the United States to prohibit such discrimination.

The CROWN Act, which was drafted and sponsored by State Senator Holly Mitchell, was passed unanimously in both chambers of the California Legislature by June 27, 2019, and was signed into law on July 3, 2019.

== CROWN Acts outside of California ==
CROWN Acts were subsequently adopted in New York, New Jersey, New York City, Washington, Maryland, Nevada, Virginia, Colorado, Texas, Massachusetts and Michigan while Illinois adopted a similar law titled the Jett Hawkins Law. and expanded those protections by enacting the CROWN Act, effective January 1, 2023, which amended the Illinois Human Rights Act.

A CROWN Act was also introduced in the South Carolina General Assembly, but did not pass the body.

=== Federal CROWN Act ===
On September 21, 2020, the U.S. House of Representatives passed the CROWN Act of 2020, which failed to pass the Senate. The bill was then reintroduced on March 22, 2021 in the House and Senate simultaneously as the CROWN Act of 2021, and was passed by the House on March 18, 2022.

The bill was never voted on in the Senate.
