= Samuel Adefila Abidoye =

Nigerian Church Leader

Prophet Samuel Adefila Abidoye
- Born: 1920|June|26; Omu Aran, Irepodum Local Government Area, Kwara State
- Died: 2023|November|12; Ilorin, Kwara State
- Citizenship: Nigerian
- Organization(s): Cherubim and Seraphim Movement Church Worldwide, Ayo Ni o
- Known for: Pastoral Activism
- Title: Baba Aladura
- Term: 2006-2023

Samuel Adefila Abidoye (26 June 1920 – 12 November 2023), also known as Baba Aladura, was a Nigerian spiritual father and chairman of Cherubim and Seraphim Movement Church Worldwide Ayo Ni O.

== Biography ==
Baba Aladura was born as a prince at Omu Aran, Irepodun Local Government Area of Kwara State to Odetundun Abegunde, who was Oba Olomu of Omu Aran, and Tinuade Tinuola, daughter of Niniola, a princess of Oponda in the preset day Isin Local Government of Kwara State. He worked at the Nigerian Railway Corporation between 1944-1958, the Nigerian Ministry of Agriculture in Kaduna State between 1958-1960, temporarily relocated to London, England and worked with the British Railways between 1961-1965 before the first Cherubim and Seraphim Church was founded by him and some other notable sojourners in England. Dr. Prophet Samuel Adefila Abidoye was unanimously appointed and officially installed the fifth Baba Aladura of the Cherubim and Seraphim Movement Church Worldwide Ayo Ni O during the Mount Horeb Ascension celebration in Kaduna, 2006. He was survived by wife and children.
