= Moses Orimolade Tunolase =

Nigerian preacher (1875–1933)

Moses Orimolade Tunolase (1875–1933) is the founder of the first Indigenous or African Independent movement, generally known as White Garment Churches, the Eternal Sacred Order of the Cherubim and Seraphim, which was established in 1925. The church was born out of the Anglican church community among the Yoruba people in Western Nigeria.

== History ==
Moses Orimolade Tunolase was born in 1879 into the royal family of Ayibiri in the Okorun district of the Yoruba town of Ikare-Akoko in the Ondo State of Nigeria. Orimolade unlike most babies could walk from birth, but his father was ashamed of this and took his son to a herbalist which caused him to lose the use of his legs. His parents had taken him to St. Stephen's Anglican Church, the only church in Ikare at the time. Orimolade was often left in the custody of the clergyman at this Church (Missionary Society) establishment of the Anglican Communion. Later, Moses would report various miracles and prophetic dreams related to this part of life.

Orimolade started his missionary work as an itinerant preacher in Ikare (his Yoruba town of birth) with no formal education, particularly targeting traditional worshippers.

=== Egbe Aladura ===
The African people were converted to the Christian faith by the members of the Church Missionary Society for the Anglican Church and were introduced to the Bible. Some of the Christianized Western world views and European moral values contradicted and contravened the nature and culture of the African people. The manifestations of the gifts of the Holy Spirit among the African converts were misunderstood and mistaken by the missionaries for African voodoo. Polygamous marriages were dissolved resulting in the bastardization of the children from these African traditional marriages.

The availability of translations of the scriptures in African languages brought the Bible to life among the African people and changed their views of the missionaries and the missions. Drumming, clapping, and dancing as methods of worship were embraced by the African people but created challenges for the missionaries and their European concept of worship. The difference in understanding of religious expression resulted in clashes and conflicts between the missionaries and the African leadership in the Anglican Church. The blind insistence of the missionaries on the superiority of the European concept of Christianity provided the moral impetus for the denial of the African leadership the right to succeed Bishop Samuel Ajayi Crowther and left the African people in the Anglican Church disconnected and discontent.

In response, the people started gathering into prayer groups called Egbe Aladura. The Aladuras promoted and popularized the power of prayer to heal. When the 1918 influenza pandemic spread to West Africa the people sought healing among the Aladuras. The healing and survival of so many Nigerians among the Aladuras during the Spanish flu spurred the growth and spread of these prayer groups in the early 1920s. Moses Orimolade arrived in Lagos on July 12, 1924, and lodged at Holy Trinity (Anglican) Church with the Sexton of the Church, Emmanuel Olumodeji from his hometown. He started preaching and praying for people all over Lagos in Nigeria. Many people in and around Holy Trinity sought Orimolade for spiritual inquiry and counseling. He developed a reputation for seasoned preaching and fervent prayer and became known among the people as the "Baba Aladura" (Father who prays). The prosperity and popularity of Moses Orimolade were not welcomed among the Anglican leadership and led to his ejection from the premises of Holy Trinity on 11 September 1924. This aroused the sympathy and support of people in and around the Church. They followed Orimolade out of Holy Trinity and thereafter to his places of residence. Orimolade called this group of supporters and sympathizers the "Aladura Band" and continued his preaching and prayer with them.

=== Separation from Anglicans ===
On 18 June 1925, the Aladura Band was called to the rescue of an unconscious Methodist teenage girl, Abiodun Akinsowon, who had fallen into a trance when she tried to look into the chalice carried by the Catholic Archbishop on Corpus Christi public procession. Abiodun remained in the trance for 21 days in the care of the Aladura Band. She regained consciousness after 21 days and joined the Aladura Band. She became the first visioner in the band. The name of the band was changed to the Seraph Band on 9 September 1925 by Moses Orimolade. The addition of Cherubim to the name was advised by a spiritual injunction on 26 March 1926 to reflect the heavenly representation of the Cherubim and Seraphim. The band was fully formed and functional by the end of 1925. Moses Orimolade reigned as the Sole Founder and Spiritual head of the band from 1925 to 1933.

=== Schism ===
Abiodun Akinsowon led the evangelistic tours of the band from Lagos westward. She was sent to establish most of the early branches of the band in the west of Nigeria. She earned the appellation "Captain Abiodun" in the band. She was loved by Moses Orimolade and admired by many members of the band. Abiodun Akinsowon rode with Moses Orimolade in the hammock chair to the envy of many men and women in the band. However, she was advised to step aside from the band in 1929 to form the Cherubim and Seraphim Society after she failed to convince Moses Orimolade to refuse the volunteer housekeeping services of a widow (Iya Ijesha) who had been healed in the band. The elders of the western Conference of the band declared independence and formed the Sacred Order of Cherubim and Seraphim following their futile effort to reunite Abiodun Akinsowon and Moses Orimolade.

In 1930 a committee of elders was chosen to draft the Article of Association in preparation for the incorporation of the band. The first draft of the Article of Association was rejected by Moses Orimolade because of a clause that transferred the executive power and control of the band to the membership of the band. Upset, the authors pulled out of the band in 1930 to form the Praying Band of the Eternal Sacred Order of the Cherubim and Seraphim under the leadership of Ezekiel Davies. The Northern Conference of the band continued as the Holy Order of the Cherubim and Seraphim Movement. The Parent Body was registered and incorporated in 1930 as the Eternal Sacred Order of the Cherubim and Seraphim (ESOC&S), with Moses Orimolade alias Baba Aladura as the Sole Founder and Spiritual Head "ALAGBA".

=== Family background ===
His family were traditional worshippers of the Yoruba religion. His father was an herbalist and a popular Masquerade known all over the town. According to Elder George Olanrewaju Tunolase who is a cousin to Orimolade, when Orimolade was in the womb he would be talking to his mother and advising her on what to do. The mother found it difficult to deliver him, while the beads of the then Owa-Ale of Ikare were demanded to be put on the mother’s neck for her to deliver safely, still, she didn’t deliver the child. However he was eventually delivered, and the very day he was born he started walking, this caused his father to use juju on him to avoid embarrassment. However, an epileptic woman who was being treated by the father of Moses fell on him when she had fit but that did not kill the newly baby boy as he grew up to be a very powerful preacher and miracle healer.While some said he was lame from birth, George denied that he was not, he used to carry my father on his shoulder to the farm., so it is not true that he was lame’’...

=== Married life ===
During his lifetime, he neither married nor had children. Speaking to The Nation, Pa Tunolase [74] who is still living in the family house said ‘’my late father who was the elder brother to the late founder of Cherubim and Seraphim told me that Moses did not marry at all. He said Moses told his father that they could go and marry but for him, he had chosen to be a Eunuch, as there are three types of Eunuch, the ones that the kings castrated and kept watching their Queens, the ones from heaven and those who became eunuch in order to serve God of which Moses chose’’. The Uncle continued ‘’my father told me that Orimolade said that his children would be like the sand of the seashore. We were confused, but now the Aladura sect is numerous all over the world as they cannot be counted.

=== Myth surrounding his miracles ===
Many mysteries are woven around Moses. He was said to have possessed a supernatural power that no one ever had. According to Most Superintendent Kunle Ayanfe, Moses was said to have been a special person with a supernatural power. He would get to where he and his group were going before any of them and they wondered how. Till he died nobody was able to unravel the mystery.’’

According to Ayanfe ‘’ some white men who heard about his good works came to approach him to come and heal their boss who resides overseas. Moses refused to go with them in the aircraft they brought and promised to meet them there. Before the white men got there, he had gone and come back. When the messengers got to their boss and saw him healed and bouncing, he told them he had been healed by a man whom he described with the features of Moses, the man they came to meet in Nigeria. He had the power he used to pass through the rock and water while people wondered how he managed to perform such a feat.

=== Tombs ===
Before his death on October 19, 1933, he instructed his followers to exhume his body forty years after his death and bury him in his hometown, Ikare, Akoko in Ondo state. Accompanied by the late Highlife musician I.K Dairo who was also popularly called Baba Aladura, and on October 19, 1975, his body was exhumed and taken to Ikare, Akoko. Where he was buried. In fact, his body was said to be fresh and intact, not decayed while his clothes were as white as snow. Ojokoro Empty Tomb At Ojokoro where the first Aladura church was established is a big mausoleum. A giant statue of the founder is erected there on top of an empty grave. In the grave are three candles which are usually lighted during service. The church faithful would dance around the mausoleum, and sleep in the mausoleum where two graves of the senior leaders were buried. Not only this, the faithful also placed kegs of water and other things where they prayed over them invoking the God of Moses Orimolade to heal, assist, and answer their prayers. Asked if the spirit of Moses is still there, an elder in the church said ‘’ Moses Orimolade shed his blood here, his flesh dried here, so it is only the body that was removed to his hometown Ikare Akoko in Ondo State. We believe His spirit is still here. While this reporter asked whether it was not blasphemy, Matthew Akeusola denied it and said they needed to appreciate and honor him. Ikare Tomb Here, at Mercyland known as Oke -Anu which is in Iku in the Iyometa Area, of Ikare Akoko Ondo State where the exhumed body of Orimolade was eventually buried in 1975. Placed by the tomb are A Holy Bible, candles, crucifix, and other things while at the entrance of the mausoleum are kegs of water and other things while people file out praying on the mountain.

=== Special Room ===
In the family house of the Orimolade Tunolases at Okorun also in the Iyometa Area of Ikare is a special room where the late founder lived before he died. The room has been kept sacred and reserved as the faithful visit there for special prayers. The room is divided into two, while the inner one is where some paraphernalia of his office is kept. Ayanfe who led this reporter there at the initial stage fell into a trance and later came back alive, he said ‘’This room is a powerful room and nobody is allowed to come in anyhow. It is sacred’’.

Corroborating what Ayanfe said, the old man in the house, Pa Tunolase said he used to hear spiritual songs every night but he was not afraid for he knew it was the Angels from Heaven that were singing. His words ‘’ I used to hear spiritual songs coming out from the room in the midnight, and we don’t see anybody at all as we only hear voices. But it is crystal clear that the man Moses is a saint.

Apostle Oladokun Aduragbemi the President General and the Spiritual Head of Eso, C&S, Noah’s Ark in London said he came from London to participate in the remembrance of the departed leader and said the room where Moses used in his father’s house is a sacred place where one’s prayer is accepted straight if one has faith. He gave an example ‘’ I came from London a few days ago and I was called on the phone that one of my children was sick. I went straight to Papa’s room and prayed. Some hours later I was informed that he had been okay and doing well.

=== Moses Well & Streams ===
There is a well-believed to be efficacious in healing all kinds of diseases. The well was said to have been blessed by the late founder who used it for healing all kinds of diseases. Women are not allowed to fetch it but only males are. Any female that fetches it will have her menstruation seized forever and will not conceive. Examples abound.

According to Prophet Adeleke Adeyanju, Moses Orimolade, by the power of The Sovereign Lord established two streams that still exist today. 1. located in Ifako Ijaye, Lagos State. 2. located in Ijoko, Ogun State

=== Ifako Stream ===
The Ifako stream was made when a man named Coker (a community leader) told Moses Orimolade that there was no water for the people in the area to drink or wash. The area which is hilly experienced water shortages due to its geographical location. Orimolade walked through the valley and prayed then he stuck the earth with his staff and water gushed out from the ground. He also blessed the water. The water is used for spiritual deliverance up till today. The streets are named after Orimolade and Coker

=== Ijoko Stream ===
The Ijoko stream came into existence when a woman who was barren and had lost hope of ever having a child approached Moses Orimolade. The woman according to soothsayers and herbalists would only have a child if she was opportune to visit Israel's Jordan River to take a bath as the only child she's destined to have has been kept there by evil forces.

Moses Orimolade then walked down the Valley of Ijoko and prayed to God. He stuck his staff into the ground and commanded that the Jordan River in Israel establish itself in the Ijoko area because of the woman. And it was so.

The woman had a bath and bore a child. The river is still there today and it is named after the Jordan River. Many have since then had their testimonies of taking a bath in the river after then.

=== Palm Tree ===
The palm tree is mysterious and medicinal. It was planted by the late founder, Orimolade. According to a prophetess,….’’ the bark is highly medicinal. It cures all ailments. People come from all over the world to take it. We don’t joke with it. Speaking further, a prophet and a prophetess said ‘’ The palm fronds on the palm trees are different from others and you cannot get it from anywhere in the world. Dr. Gabriel Olukayode said he was born in the Aladura sect and cannot leave it. For Popoola Babatunde Raphael, the growth within the Aladura can be compared with that of the Catholic, as it is growing every day and no other sect can rival it. Defending why the growth is still spreading, Gorge Asogba said ’’ Since Orimolade had refused to have children, God compensated him by multiplying the number of the Aladura faithful as they are called Children of Moses Orimolade. Asked why most of the faithful and their children wear dreadlocks, Asogba defended it by saying ‘’Moses Orimolade had dreadlocks and so it was passed to us all and it is for protection. Whoever has such in the family is a blessing to the family’’ When challenged that some Christians have the opinion that they are fetish since they are practicing the Old Testament in the way of their worship by sacrificing, using coconuts, and candles among other things, Aduragbemi debunked the claim and said ‘’ they are just envious of the sect’’.

== Beliefs and practices ==
The Order believes in the Holy Bible as the word of God and in salvation through Jesus Christ and in the Trinity in unity, the use of incense, purification by prayer and fasting, and resurrection of the dead. Its first and primary work is that of prayer and preaching of the gospel. It believes in the curative effect of prayer for all afflictions, spiritual and temporal, but condemns and abhors the use of charms or fetish witchcraft or sorcery of any kind and all heathenish sacrifices and practices. It is not averse to the judicious use of curative herbs, the engagement of qualified medical practitioners or doctors, or the use of patent medicines or other drugs. It endorses and practices the sanctification of water by prayer and the effect of such consecrated water for every purpose.

The ESOC&S is a Spiritual Christian Movement with membership in the Christian Association of Nigeria. Membership is open to people of all races, ages, and both sexes. Members are required to wear prayer robes at all times for worship. All members are priests and may be called upon at any time to perform religious rites appropriate for their age and sex. Ordination and promotion are based on the performance and promotion of the activities of the holy order, attendance at religious ceremonies, and availability for religious duties. Shoes are not allowed in the house of prayer. Female members and non-members must cover their heads and may not enter the worship area during their monthly periods. Tithes and offerings are used for bills, worship articles, and the welfare of the order. The Holy Order has no paid priesthood. The church currently has about 10 million members that worship in about 1500 branches all over the world including the United Kingdom and the United States.

== See also ==
- Christianity in Nigeria
- Cherubim and Seraphim Society
- Cherubim and Seraphim (Nigerian Church)
