= Christiana Abiodun Emanuel =

Nigerian missionary (born 1907)

- Born: Abiodun Akinsowon; 1907
- Died: 1994 (aged 87)
- Spouse: George Orisanya Emanuel (m. 1942)

Christiana Abiodun Emanuel, born Abiodun Akinsowon (1907–1994), was a co-founder, along with Moses Orimolade Tunolase, of the Cherubim and Seraphim, an Aladura Christian denomination in Nigeria. After a schism in the church, she founded and led the Cherubim and Seraphim Society.

== Personal life ==
Abiodun Akinsowon was born in 1907 in the Republic of Benin. In 1920, she left her home country to join her aunt in Lagos, Nigeria to train as a seamstress. In 1942, she married George Orisanya Emanuel, a civil servant working in Lagos City Council.

== Founding the Cherubim and Seraphim ==
In 1925, while watching a Catholic Corpus Christi procession, Emanuel reportedly fell into a lengthy trance. She awoke from her coma after the healer Moses Orimolade arrived to pray for her. Waking, Emanuel claimed she had been visited by angels who had taken her to heaven. As increasing numbers of visitors came to hear of her visions, Orimolade founded an interdenominational prayer group called the Cherubim and Seraphim. In 1927, Emanuel led an evangelical tour of Western Nigeria, condemning the worship of traditional gods and encouraging Christian prayer. In 1928, they established the Cherubim and Seraphim as its own independent church, within the Aladura tradition.

== Schism and reconciliation ==
In 1929, the Cherubim and Seraphim underwent its first schism, with Emanuel founding the Cherubim and Seraphim Society and Orimolade founding the Eternal Sacred Order of Cherubim and Seraphim. The split arose from disputes within the group over the role of female leadership. Emanuel demanded to be recognised as co-founder of the church. This was viewed by Orimolade, who denied she was co-founder, as insubordination, and led to their eventual split. This was followed by other schisms, leading to the existence of more than 10 separate sects within the Cherubim and Seraphim.

After Orimolade's death, Emanuel campaigned to be recognised as the supreme head of the church, claiming she had been discriminated against as a woman. In 1986, in an attempt to reunite the disparate groupings, she was reinstalled as leader of a united Cherubim and Seraphim Church.
