= Aladura =

Christian religious movement

- Classification: Protestant
- Orientation: Mostly Pentecostal
- Origin: Early 20th century South-Western, Nigeria

Aladura (Yoruba: Aladura, "praying people") is a Christian religious movement and collective designation for a wide range of independent prophet-healing churches that originated among the Yoruba people of southwestern Nigeria in the early 20th century. The movement began developing in western Nigeria from about 1918, subsequently spreading as far as Cameroon and Sierra Leone and establishing branches in Britain. It comprises several major church traditions as well as numerous smaller churches and groups formed through secessions from them.

The largest of the Aladura churches is the Christ Apostolic Church, which in its earlier development received assistance from Faith Tabernacle Congregation in Philadelphia and the Apostolic Church in England. From 1930 it expanded through a mass healing revival led by Joseph Babalola (1904–1960). One of its founders, later Sir Isaac Akinyele, subsequently became Olubadan ("king") of Ibadan. The church developed into a well-organized body, became a member of the Nigerian Christian Council, established its own schools and teacher-training institutions, and grew to several hundred thousand members.

Another major branch consists of the various Cherubim and Seraphim societies, which originated with the Yoruba prophet Moses Tunolase (c. 1885–1933) and the young Anglican woman Victorianah Abiodun Akinsowon (1907–1994). These groups separated from the Anglican Church in 1928, and their various branches share a strong emphasis on revelation and healing.

A third principal body, the Church of the Lord (Aladura), was founded in 1930 by the Anglican catechist Josiah Oshitelu (1902–1966), who had been dismissed because of practices regarded as deviationist. Although its membership never exceeded approximately 15,000, the church spread widely throughout West Africa and into Britain. Its second leader, E. O. A. Adejobi, became a member of the Central Committee of the World Council of Churches in 1983. The wider Aladura movement also encompasses numerous smaller churches and many groups that emerged through secessions from these principal traditions.

== History/Founding ==
The emergence of the Aladura movement can be traced to the early 20th century in Southwest Nigeria. In the 1920’s, there was increasing unrest due to several crises, including influenza, smallpox, and bubonic plague epidemics. In the midst of these crises, members of the Saint Saviour Anglican Church in Ijebu Ode, created a prayer group which began Aladura.

=== Precious Stone Society ===
The sexton of Saint Savior Anglican Church, referred to as Daddy Ali, dreamt that the majority of the church, who used traditional medicine were covered in darkness while the minority who relied on prayer for healing were in the light. Daddy Ali and several church elders with whom he shared his dream, felt convinced to start the Precious Stone Society (Egbe Okuta Iyebiye), devoted to the spiritual healing and fervent prayer that Aladura would be known for. The Precious Stone Society promoted divine healing and devotion to prayer as cures for sickness in place of medicine, which they believed to be unbiblical.

The teachings and doctrine of Faith Tabernacle, headquartered in Philadelphia, were implemented within the Previous Stone Society. Faith Tabernacle embraced spiritual healing, which appealed to the members of the Precious Stone Society in the midst of numerous epidemics. In 1923, the Precious Stone Society became independent from Saint Savior Anglican Church after it rejected infant baptism, as Faith Tabernacle had also done.

=== Major Denominations/Sub-groups ===
Numerous churches arose from the Aladura movement, the largest of which are Cherubim and Seraphim (C&S), The Church of the Lord Aladura, Christ Apostolic Church (CAC), and Celestial Church of Christ (CCC).

==== Cherubim and Seraphim (C&S) ====
Cherubim and Seraphim was founded in September 1925 in Lagos by Moses Orimolade and Captain Christianah Abiodun Akinsowon. Cherubim and Seraphim originally started as the 'Aladura Band' and was then later changed to the "Seraph Band" before "Cherubim" was added to represent the cherubim angels.

Over the course of the 20th century, Cherubim and Seraphim has been divided into several branch groups:

- Cherubim and Seraphim Society (CSS)
- Eternal Sacred Order of Cherubim and Seraphim
- Praying Brand of C&S
- Holy Mary
- The Sacred Order of C&S
- C&S Movement Church

==== The Church of the Lord Aladura (TCLA) ====
The Church of the Lord Aladura was founded by Joseph Olunowo Ositelu, a former Anglican catechist, in 1930 in Ogere, Nigeria. In 1925, Ositelu claimed to receive visions and revelations from God, calling him to be a prophet. The leaders within the Church Missionary Society did not support Ositelu's prophetic activities and suspended him. It was after this that he began open-air preaching and the Church of the Lord Aladura started.

TCLA uses a formal centralized hierarchy system. The church is led by a Primate. The structure of the church has different levels, including the International Headquarters, Provinces, Dioceses, Zones, and local Parishes.

There are 4 tenets of The Church of the Lord Aladura:

1. Biblical in Pattern
2. Pentecostal in Power
3. Evangelical in Ministry
4. Ecumenical in Outlook

== Spiritual Beliefs ==
=== Prayer ===
In Yoruba, Aladura is often translated to "owner of prayer" or "praying people", and prayer is the center of the Aladura belief system. Followers of the Aladura faith tradition view prayer as an active and divine tool which can be utilized to call divine intervention in people's lives. All Aladura churches from the various branches believe and practice intense, long prayer sessions directed by the Holy Spirit. Through these prayers, it is believed that one's material circumstances can be changed, and one can receive divine healing and revelations from God.

=== Divine Healing ===
Healing is at the foundation of Aladura, dating back to its origin as a response to health crises. They believe in healing primarily by faith alone and not by Western or native medicine. In the early movement, western and traditional medicine were both explicitly rejected. Aladuras believe in the power of water for healing (omi adura). This belief is similar to Yoruba traditional religion, where the river goddess Oshun has healing power through water. Omi Adura is believed to heal all ailments and healing rituals can take place at rivers, oceans, and streams.

=== Spiritual Warfare ===
The Aladura believe in a cosmos containing many invisible powers and life containing constant battles between good and evil. Aladura maintains the belief in "witches", "sorcerers" and "evil spirits" that Yoruba traditional religion sometimes attributes life's misfortunes to.

== Role of Women in Aladura ==
Women have been central to many of the developments and revelations that began Aladura and the groups that came out of the Aladura movement. In Yoruba traditional religion, women play a key role as they are believed to have Aṣẹ (prophetic power). The role of women in Yoruba traditional religion has manifested itself in the Aladura belief system.

=== Spiritual Authority ===
Women were instrumental in the divine revelations that started Aladura. Sophia Odunlami promoted hydrotherapy in the Precious Stone Society as a form of divine healing during the influenza outbreak in Ijebu Ode. Aladura gives women recognition for their unique spiritual power, allowing them to serve as prophets and leaders. Men in Aladura are expected to obey and act accordingly when given prophecies and other forms of spiritual counsel or guidance by women in authoritative positions.

=== Restrictions ===
Women in Aladura are often limited from certain activities and spaces to manage ritual purity. Many churches believe that menstruating and childbirth make a woman unclean, drawing from the Old Testament. The presence of unclean women during spiritual activities is believed to neutralize sacred objects. During these periods when women are considered unclean, they are often barred from entering the main sanctuary of the church and the altar, as well as any other areas that male leaders within the church are. After a woman's menstrual period and 40 days after childbirth, she must go through a sanctification process before she is allowed to fully integrate back into church activities.

=== Roles and Leadership positions ===
Although men dominate leadership positions within most Aladura churches, women often have parallel positions of significant importance. In the Eternal Sacred Order of Cherubim and Seraphim, the head of the church is known as the Baba Aladura. It is a role that cannot be held by women. The highest roles that can be held by women are:

- Mother Cherub
- Mother Seraph
- Mother Captain

Women in Aladura created their own spaces where they could have their own impact. Mother Cherub Olugbusi and Prophetess B.K. Otubu created the first women's association in the Eternal Sacred Order of Cherubim and Seraphim in 1974. The Women's Association has been used to assert women's leadership within the church and their roles as peacemakers and healers.
