= Cherubim and Seraphim Church of Zion =

Christian denomination from Nigeria

Cherubim and Seraphim Church of Zion is a Christian denomination from Nigeria. It was founded by Elisha Ilene Ogunfeyimi in 1948. Its headquarters is in Ugbonla.

== See also ==
- Christianity in Nigeria
- Cherubim and Seraphim Society
- Eternal Sacred Order of Cherubim and Seraphim
- Cherubim and Seraphim (Nigerian Church)
