= Dreadlocks =

Rope-like matted hairstyle

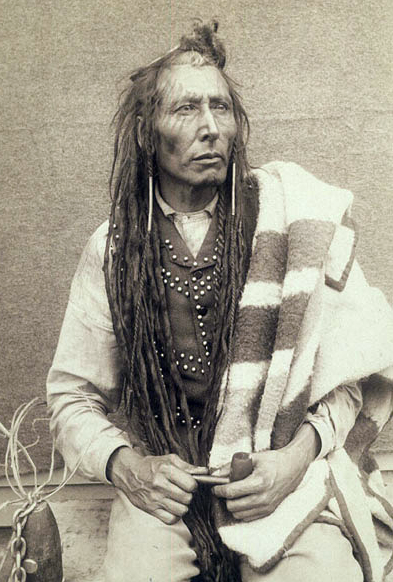
Cree chief Poundmaker with locked hair, 1885

Dreadlocks, also known as dreads or locs, are a hairstyle made of rope-like strands of hair. Locs can form naturally in very curly or kinky hair, or they can be created with techniques like twisting, backcombing, or crochet.

== Etymology ==
An older name for dreadlocks was elflocks, from the notion that elves had twisted the locks in people's sleep.

In their 2014 book Hair Story: Untangling the Roots of Black Hair in America, Ayana Byrd and Lori Tharps claim that the name dredlocs originated in the time of the slave trade: when transported Africans disembarked from the slave ships after spending months confined in unhygienic conditions, whites would report that their undressed and matted kinky hair was "dreadful". According to them, it is due to these circumstances that many people wearing the style today drop the a in dreadlock to avoid negative implications. Other origins have been proposed. Some authors trace the term to the Mau Mau, a group from British colonialists in 1959 as a reference to their dreadful hair.

The word locs refers to locks of entangled hair.

Several languages have names for these locks:

- Jaṭā In Sanskrit.
- Ndiagne and Ndjan in Wolof.
- Mpesempese in Akan.
- Dada in Yoruba.
- Ezenwa and Elena in Igbo.
- Goscha in Hamer.
- Mhotsi in Shona.
- Mĩndĩga and Matenjagwo in Gĩkũyũ
- Nontombi in Nyaneka.
- Rastas in Spanish.

== History ==
=== Africa ===
The earliest archaeological evidence of dreadlocks and locked hair in Kerma culture (in what's today Sudan) dates back approximately 4,000 years to the Kerma period (c. 2500–1500 BCE).4,000-year-old lock of dark hair discovered at the Kadruka cemeteries in northern Sudan. This confirms that the preservation of distinct hair styling, braiding, and matting has prehistoric roots in the Middle Nile Valley.

According to Sherrow in Encyclopedia of Hair: A Cultural History, locs date back to ancient times in various cultures. In ancient Egypt, Egyptians wore locked hairstyles and wigs appeared on bas-reliefs, statuary and other artifacts. Mummified remains of Egyptians with locked wigs have also been recovered from archaeological sites. According to Maria Delongoria, braided hair has been worn by people in the Sahara desert since 3000 BCE. Dreadlocks were also worn by followers of Abrahamic religions. For example Ethiopian Coptic Bahatowie priests adopted dreadlocks as a hairstyle before the fifth century CE (400 or 500 CE). Locking hair was practiced by some ethnic groups in East, Central, West and Southern Africa.

=== Europe ===
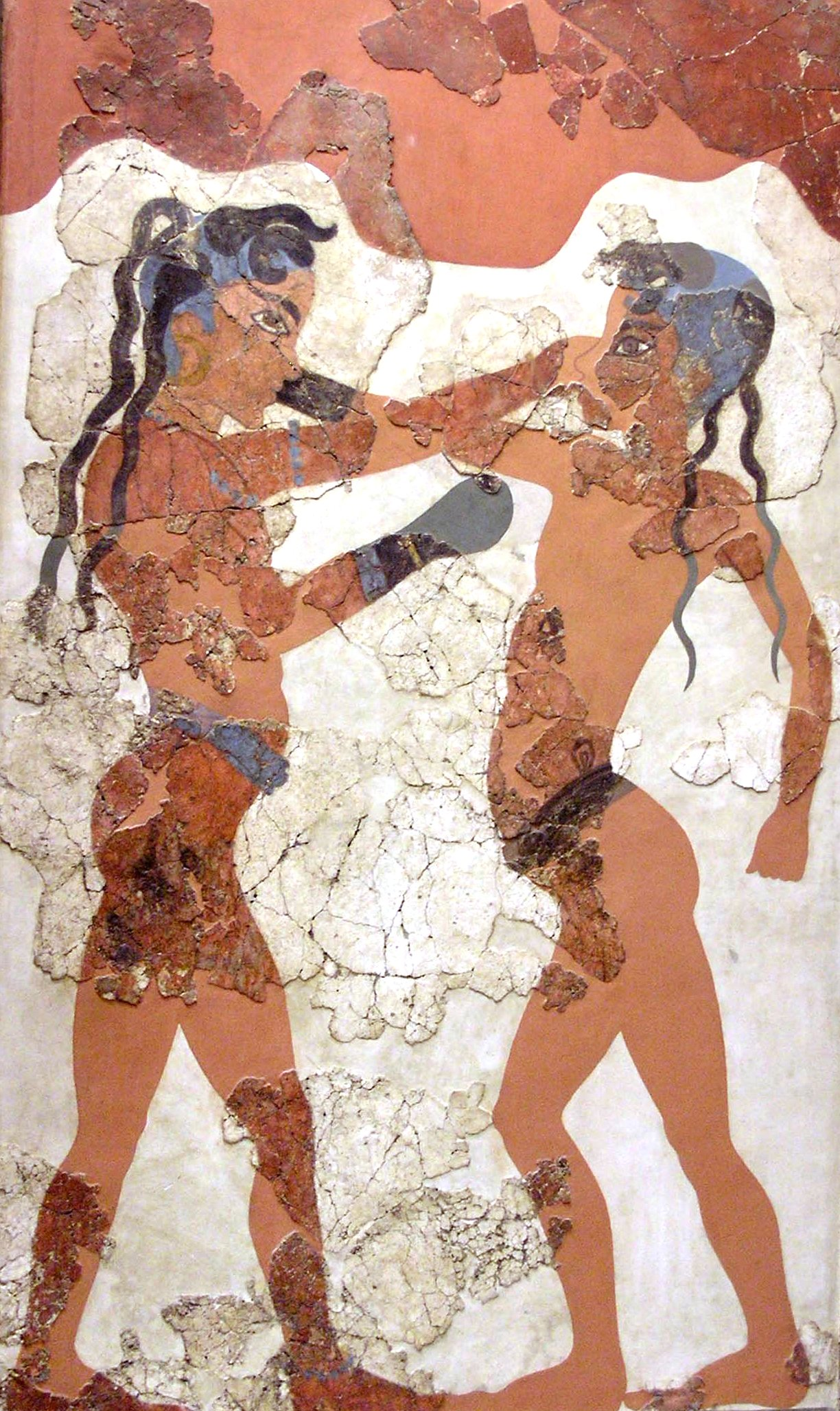
Boxers with dreadlocks on a fresco from Akrotiri (modern Santorini, Greece), 1600–1500 BCE

The earliest known possible depictions of locs in Europe date back as far as 1600–1500 BCE in the Minoan Civilization, centered in Crete (now part of Greece). Frescoes discovered on the Aegean island of Thera (modern Santorini, Greece) portray individuals with long braided hair or long dreadlocks. Another source describes the hair of the boys in the Akrotiri Boxer Fresco as long tresses, not dreadlocks. Tresses of hair are defined by Collins Dictionary as braided hair, braided plaits, or long loose curls of hair. In Poland, dreadlocks are part of Polish tradition, also known as Polish plait.

=== Mesoamerica ===
Pre-Columbian Aztec priests were described in Aztec codices (including the Durán Codex, the Codex Tudela and the Codex Mendoza) as wearing their hair untouched, allowing it to grow long and matted. Bernal Diaz del Castillo records:

There were priests with long robes of black cloth... The hair of these priests was very long and so matted that it could not be separated or disentangled, and most of them had their ears scarified, and their hair was clotted with blood.

=== 19th century ===
In Senegal, the Baye Fall, followers of the Mouride movement, a Sufi movement of Islam founded in 1887 CE by Shaykh Aamadu Bàmba Mbàkke, are famous for growing dreadlocks and wearing multi-colored gowns.

Cheikh Ibra Fall, founder of the Baye Fall school of the Mouride Brotherhood, popularized the style by adding a mystic touch to it. This sect of Islam in Senegal, where Muslims wear ndjan (dreadlocks), aimed to Africanize Islam. Dreadlocks to this group of Islamic followers symbolize their religious orientation. Jamaican Rastas also reside in Senegal and have settled in areas near Baye Fall communities. Baye Fall and Jamaican Rastas have similar cultural beliefs regarding dreadlocks. Both groups wear knitted caps to cover their locs and wear locs for religious and spiritual purposes. Male members of the Baye Fall religion wear locs to detach from mainstream Western ideals.

=== 20th century into present day ===
In the 1970s, Americans and Britons attended reggae concerts and were exposed to various aspects of Jamaican culture, including dreadlocks. Hippies related to the Rastafarian idea of rejecting capitalism and colonialism, symbolized by the name "Babylon". Rastafarians rejected Babylon in several ways, including by wearing their hair naturally in locs to defy Western standards of beauty. The 1960s was the height of the civil rights movement in the U.S., and some White Americans joined Black people in the fight against inequality and segregation and were inspired by Black culture. As a result some White people joined the Rastafarian movement. Dreadlocks were not a common hairstyle in the United States but by the 1970s some White Americans were inspired by reggae music, the Rastafarian movement and African-American hair culture and started wearing dreadlocks. According to authors Bronner and Dell Clark, the clothing styles worn by hippies in the 1960s and 1970s were copied from African-American culture. The word hippie comes from the African-American slang word hip. African-American dress and hairstyles such as braids (often decorated with beads), dreadlocks, and language were copied by hippies and developed into a new countercultural movement used by hippies.

Starting in the 1950s hundreds of Jamaicans and other Caribbean people immigrated to the metropolitan centers of London, Birmingham, Paris and Amsterdam. Communities of Jamaicans, Caribbeans and Rastas emerged in these areas. Thus Europeans in these metropolitan cities were introduced to Black cultures from the Caribbean and Rastafarian practices and were inspired by Caribbean culture, leading some of them to adopt Black hair culture, music and religion. However the strongest influence of Rastafari religion is among Europe's Black population.

When reggae music, which espoused Rastafarian ideals, gained popularity and mainstream acceptance in the 1970s, thanks to Bob Marley's music and cultural influence, dreadlocks (often called "dreads") became a notable fashion statement worldwide and have been worn by prominent authors, actors, athletes and rappers. Rastafari influenced its members worldwide to embrace dreadlocks. Black Rastas lock their hair to embrace their African heritage and accept African features as beautiful, such as dark skin tones, Afro-textured hair, and African facial features.

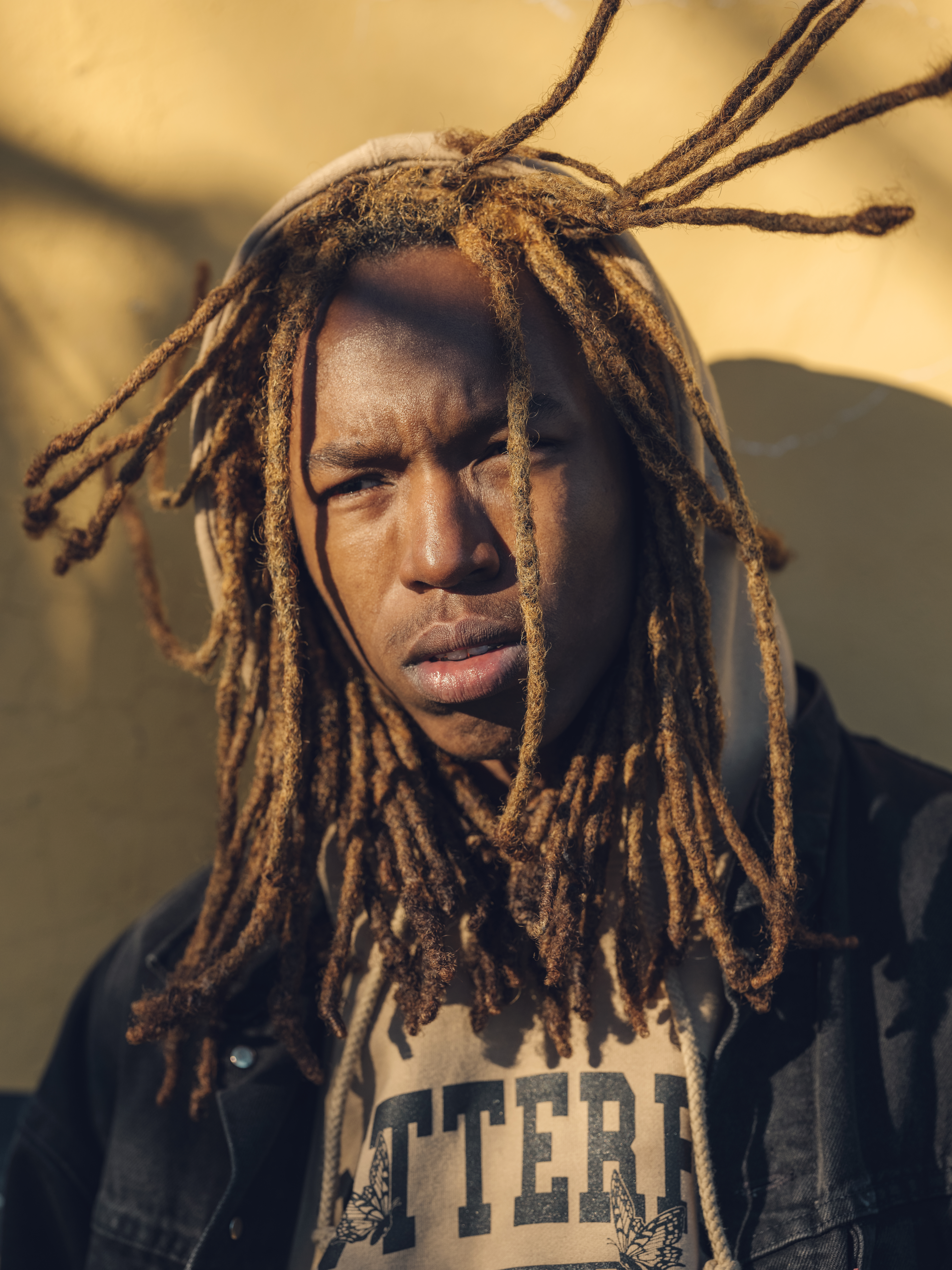
The rapper Mavi wearing dreadlocks

Hip-hop and rap artists such as Lauryn Hill, Lil Wayne, T-Pain, Snoop Dogg, J-Cole, Wiz Khalifa, Chief Keef, Lil Jon, and other artists wear dreadlocks, which further popularized the hairstyle in the 1990s, early 2000s and present day. Dreadlocks are a part of hip-hop fashion and reflect Black cultural music of liberation and identity. Many rappers and Afrobeat artists in Uganda wear locs, such as Navio, Delivad Julio, Fik Fameica, Vyper Ranking, Byaxy, Liam Voice, and other artists. From reggae music to hip-hop, rap, and Afrobeat, Black artists in the African diaspora wear locs to display their Black identity and culture.

Youth in Kenya who are fans of rap and hip-hop music, and Kenyan rappers and musicians, wear locs to connect to the history of the Mau Mau freedom fighters who wore locs as symbols of anti-colonialism, and to Bob Marley, who was a Rasta. Hip-hop and reggae fashion spread to Ghana and fused with traditional Ghanaian culture. Ghanaian musicians wear dreadlocks incorporating reggae symbols and hip-hop clothes mixed with traditional Ghanaian textiles, such as wearing Ghanaian headwraps to hold their locs. Ghanaian women wear locs as a symbol of African beauty. The beauty industry in Ghana believe locs are a traditional African hair practice and market hair care products to promote natural African hairstyles such as afros and locs. The previous generations of Black artists have inspired younger contemporary Black actresses to lock their hair, such as Chloe Bailey, Halle Bailey, and R&B and Pop music singer Willow Smith. More Black actors in Hollywood are choosing to lock their hair to embrace their Black heritage.

Although more Black women in Hollywood and the beauty and music industries are wearing locs, there has never been a Black Miss America winner with locs, possibly because the hairstyle has not been popular with many conservative standards of beauty. For example, model Adesuwa Aighewi locked her hair and was told she might not receive any casting calls because of her dreadlocks. Some Black women in modeling agencies are forced to straighten their hair. However, more Black women are resisting and choosing to wear Black hairstyles such as afros and dreadlocks in fashion shows and beauty pageants. For example, in 2007 Miss Universe Jamaica and Rastafarian, Zahra Redwood, was the first Black woman to break the barrier on a world pageant stage when she wore locs, paving the way and influencing other Black women to wear locs in beauty pageants. In 2015, Miss Jamaica World Sanneta Myrie was the first contestant to wear locs to the Miss World Pageant. In 2018, Dee-Ann Kentish-Rogers of Britain was crowned Miss Universe wearing her locs and became the first Black British woman to win the competition with natural locs.

== By culture ==
Locks have been worn for various reasons in many cultures and ethnic groups around the world throughout history. Their use has also been raised in debates about cultural appropriation.

=== Africa ===
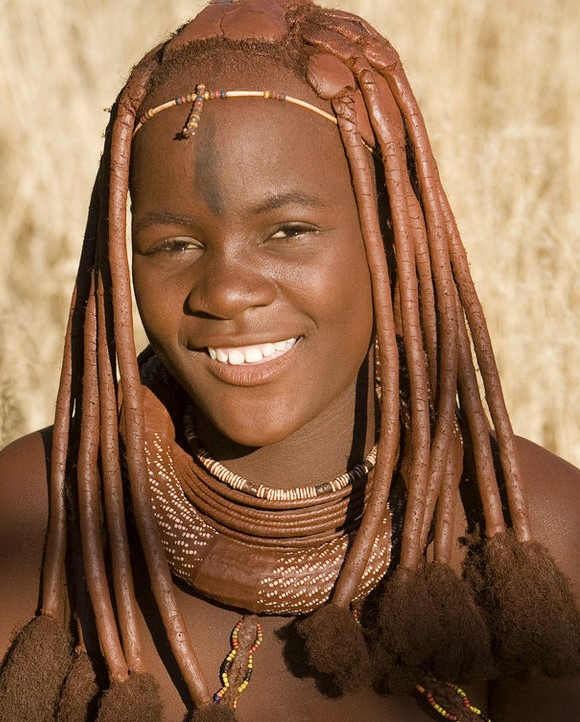
Himba woman with red dreadlocks

The practice of wearing braids and dreadlocks in Africa can be traced back to 3,000 BC in the Sahara Desert. It has been commonly thought that other cultures influenced the dreadlock tradition in Africa. The Kikuyu and Somali wear braided and locked hairstyles. Warriors among the Fulani, Wolof, and Serer in Mauritania, and Mandinka in Mali were known for centuries to have worn cornrows when young and dreadlocks when old.

In West Africa, the water spirit Mami Wata is said to have long locked hair. Mami Wata's spiritual powers of fertility and healing come from her dreadlocks. West African spiritual priests called Dada wear dreadlocks to venerate Mami Wata in her honor as spiritual consecrations. Some Ethiopian Christian monks and Bahatowie priests of the Ethiopian Coptic Church lock their hair for religious purposes. In Yorubaland, Aladura church prophets called woolii mat their hair into locs and wear long blue, red, white, or purple garments with caps and carry iron rods used as a staff. Prophets lock their hair in accordance with the Nazarene vow in the Christian bible. This is not to be confused with the Rastafari religion that was started in the 1930s. The Aladura church was founded in 1925 and syncretizes indigenous Yoruba beliefs about dreadlocks with Christianity. Moses Orimolade Tunolase was the founder of the first African Pentecostal movement started in 1925 in Nigeria. Tunolase wore dreadlocks and members of his church wear dreadlocks in his honor and for spiritual protection.

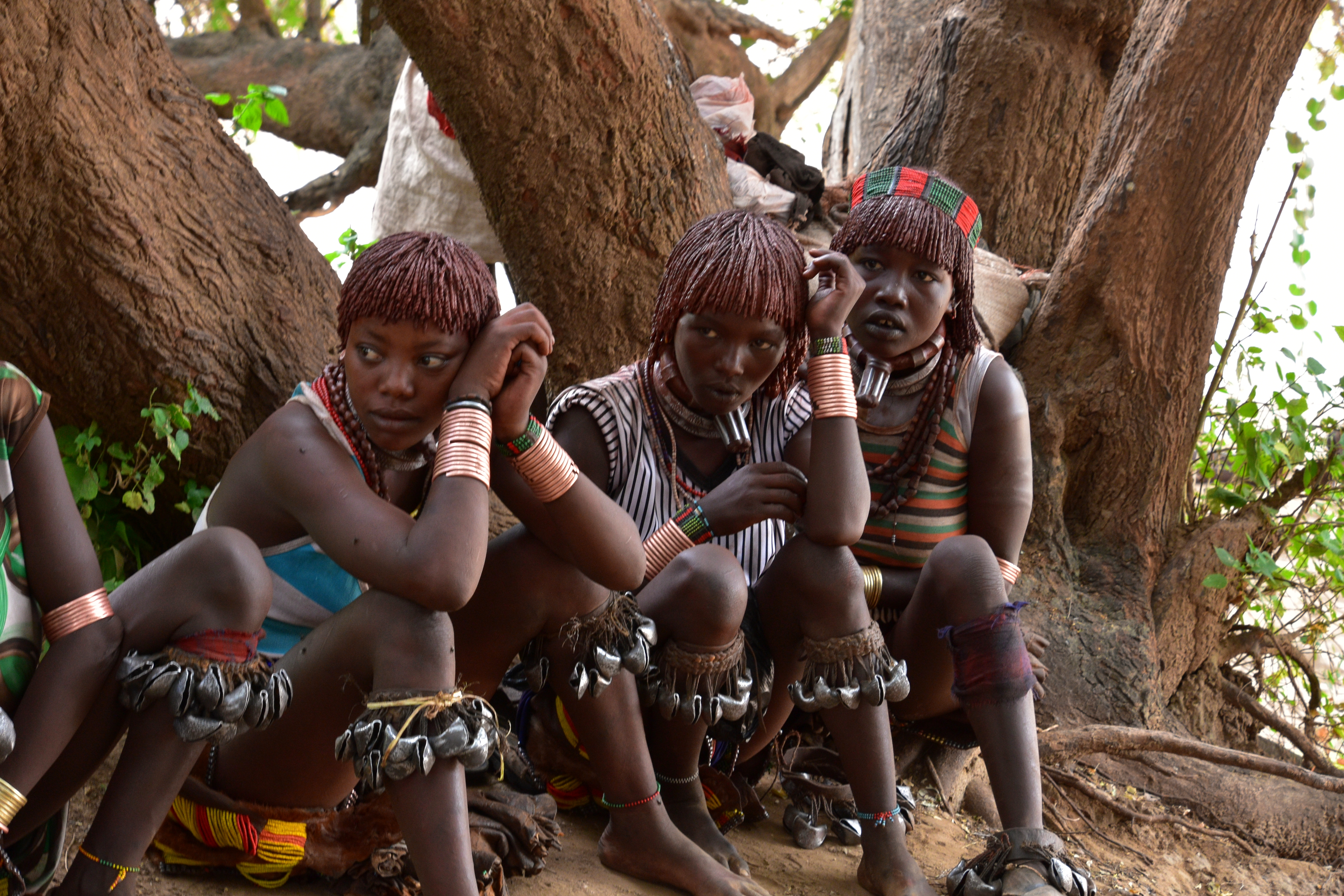
Hamar women with red ochre locs

The Yoruba word Dada is given to children in Nigeria born with dreadlocks. Some Yoruba people believe children born with dreadlocks have innate spiritual powers, and cutting their hair might cause serious illness. Only the child's mother can touch their hair. "Dada children are believed to be young gods, they are often offered at spiritual altars for chief priests to decide their fate. Some children end up becoming spiritual healers and serve at the shrine for the rest of their lives." If their hair is cut, it must be cut by a chief priest and placed in a pot of water with herbs, and the mixture is used to heal the child if they get sick. Among the Igbo, Dada children are said to be reincarnated Jujuists of great spiritual power because of their dreadlocks. Children born with dreadlocks are viewed as special. The child continues to be recognized as mysterious and special. It is believed that the hair of Dada children was braided in heaven before they were born and will bring good fortune and wealth to their parents. When the child is older, the hair is cut during a special ritual. In Yoruba mythology, the Orisha Yemoja gave birth to a Dada who is a deified king in Yoruba. However, dreadlocks are viewed by some in a negative light in Nigeria due to their stereotypical association with gangs and criminal activity; men with dreadlocks face profiling from Nigerian police.

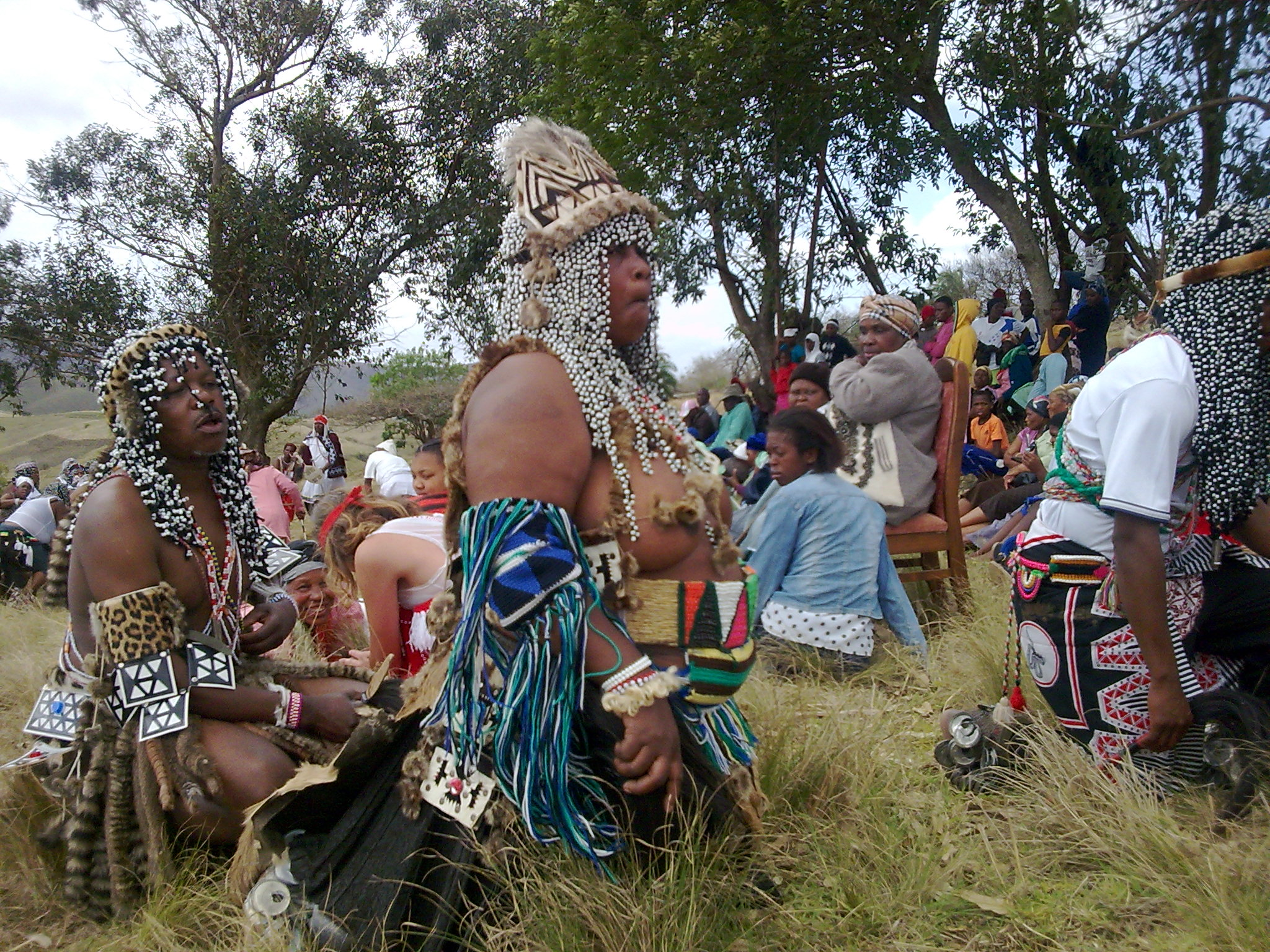
Sangomas wearing white beaded dreadlocks

In Ghana, among the Ashanti people, Okomfo priests are identified by their dreadlocks. They are not allowed to cut their hair and must allow it to mat and lock naturally. Locs are symbols of higher power reserved for priests. Other spiritual people in Southern Africa who wear dreadlocks are Sangomas. Sangomas wear red and white beaded dreadlocks to connect to ancestral spirits. Two African men were interviewed, explaining why they chose to wear dreadlocks. "One – Mr. Ngqula – said he wore his dreadlocks to obey his ancestors' call, given through dreams, to become a 'sangoma' in accordance with his Xhosa culture. Another – Mr. Kamlana – said he was instructed to wear his dreadlocks by his ancestors and did so to overcome 'intwasa', a condition understood in African culture as an injunction from the ancestors to become a traditional healer, from which he had suffered since childhood." In Zimbabwe, there is a tradition of locking hair called mhotsi worn by spirit mediums called svikiro. The Rastafarian religion spread to Zimbabwe and influenced some women in Harare to wear locs because they believe in the Rastafari's pro-Black teachings and rejection of colonialism.

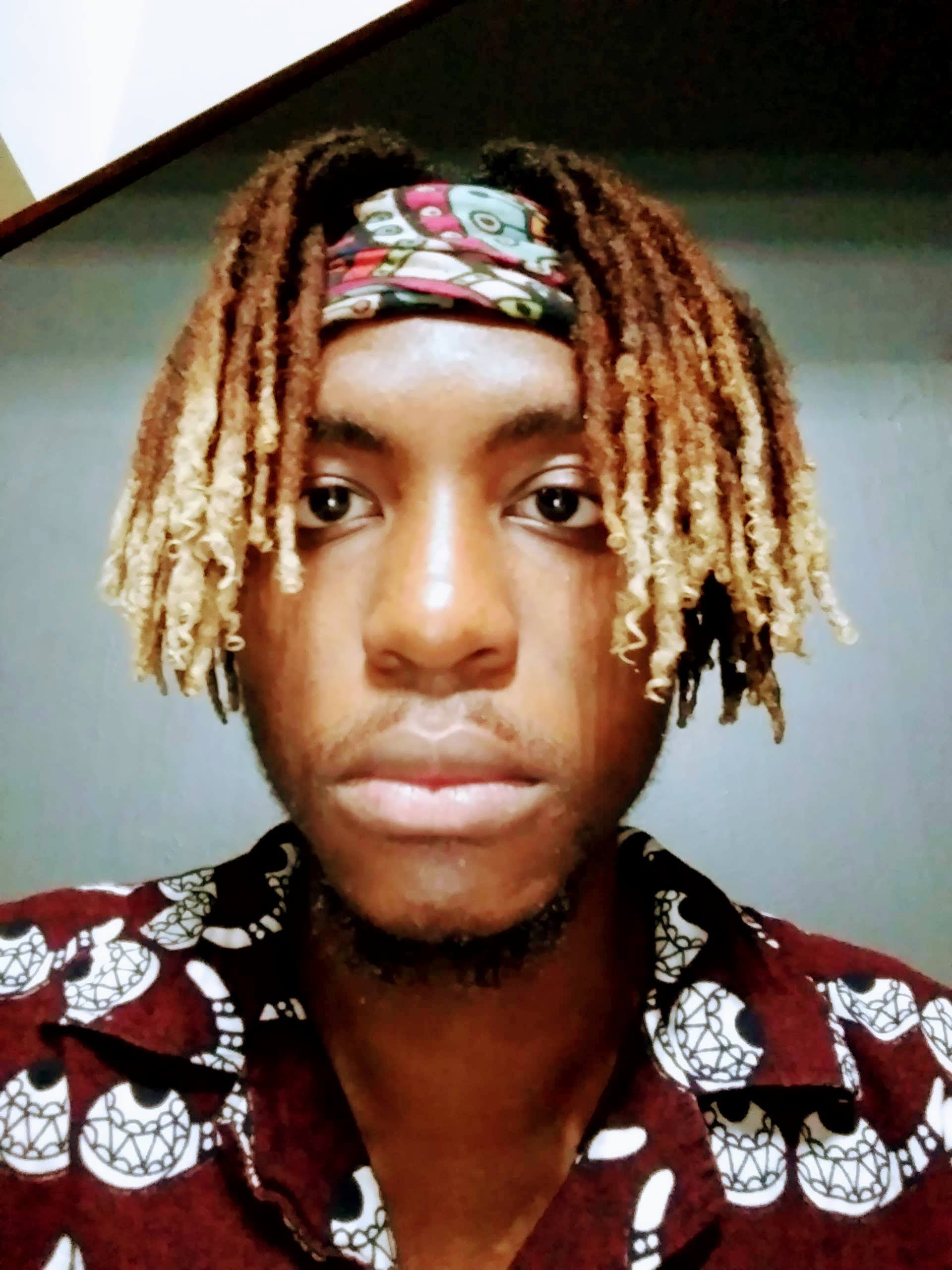
Zulu-Shona African Man With Salon-styled dreadlocks. In the Shona language, locs translate to mhotsi

Maasai warriors in Kenya are known for their long, thin, red dreadlocks, dyed with red root extracts or red ochre (red earth clay). The Himba women in Namibia are also known for their red-colored dreadlocks. Himba women use red earth clay mixed with butterfat and roll their hair with the mixture. They use natural moisturizers to maintain the health of their hair. Hamar women in Ethiopia wear red-colored locs made using red earth clay. In Angola, Mwila women create thick dreadlocks covered in herbs, crushed tree bark, dried cow dung, butter, and oil. The thick dreadlocks are dyed using oncula, an ochre of red crushed rock. In Southern, Eastern, and Northern Africa, Africans use red ochre as sunscreen and cover their dreadlocks and braids with ochre to hold their hair in styles and as a hair moisturizer by mixing it with fats. Red ochre has a spiritual meaning of fertility, and in Maasai culture, the color red symbolizes bravery and is used in ceremonies and dreadlock hair traditions.

Historians note that West and Central African people braid their hair to signify age, gender, rank, role in society, and ethnic affiliation. In many tribes, it is believed braided and locked hair provides spiritual protection, connects people to the spirit of the earth, bestows spiritual power, and enables people to communicate with the gods and spirits. In the 15th and 16th centuries, the Atlantic slave trade saw Black Africans forcibly transported from Sub-Saharan Africa to North America and, upon their arrival in the New World, their heads would be shaved in an effort to erase their culture.

=== Buddhism ===
Within Tibetan Buddhism and other more esoteric forms of Buddhism, locks have occasionally been substituted for the more traditional shaved head. The most recognizable of these groups are known as the Ngagpas of Tibet. For Buddhists of these particular sects and degrees of initiation, their locked hair is not only a symbol of their vows but an embodiment of the particular powers they are sworn to carry. Hevajra Tantra 1.4.15 states that the practitioner of particular ceremonies "should arrange his piled up hair" as part of the ceremonial protocol. Archeologists found a statue of a male deity, Shiva, with dreadlocks in Stung Treng province in Cambodia. In a sect of tantric Buddhism, some initiates wear dreadlocks. The sect of tantric Buddhism in which initiates wear dreadlocks is called weikza and Passayana or Vajrayana Buddhism. This sect of Buddhism is practiced in Burma. The initiates spend years in the forest with this practice, and when they return to the temples, they should not shave their heads to reintegrate.

=== Hinduism ===
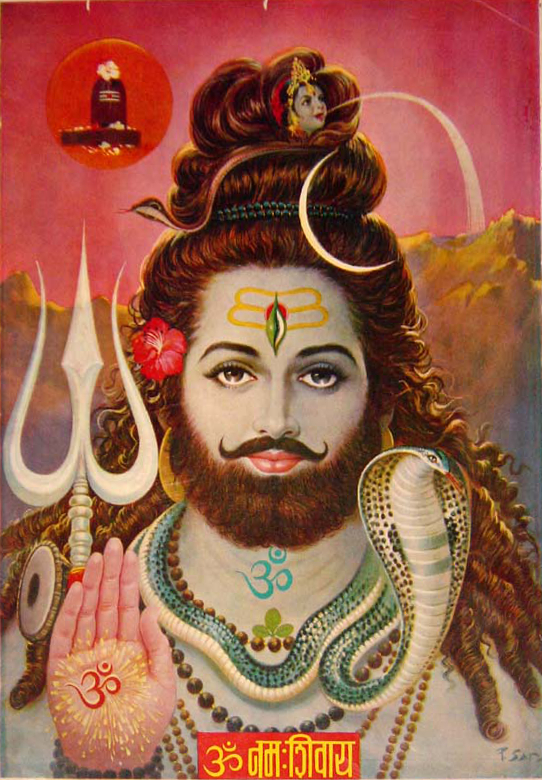
The Hindu deity Shiva, depicted here with coils of hair

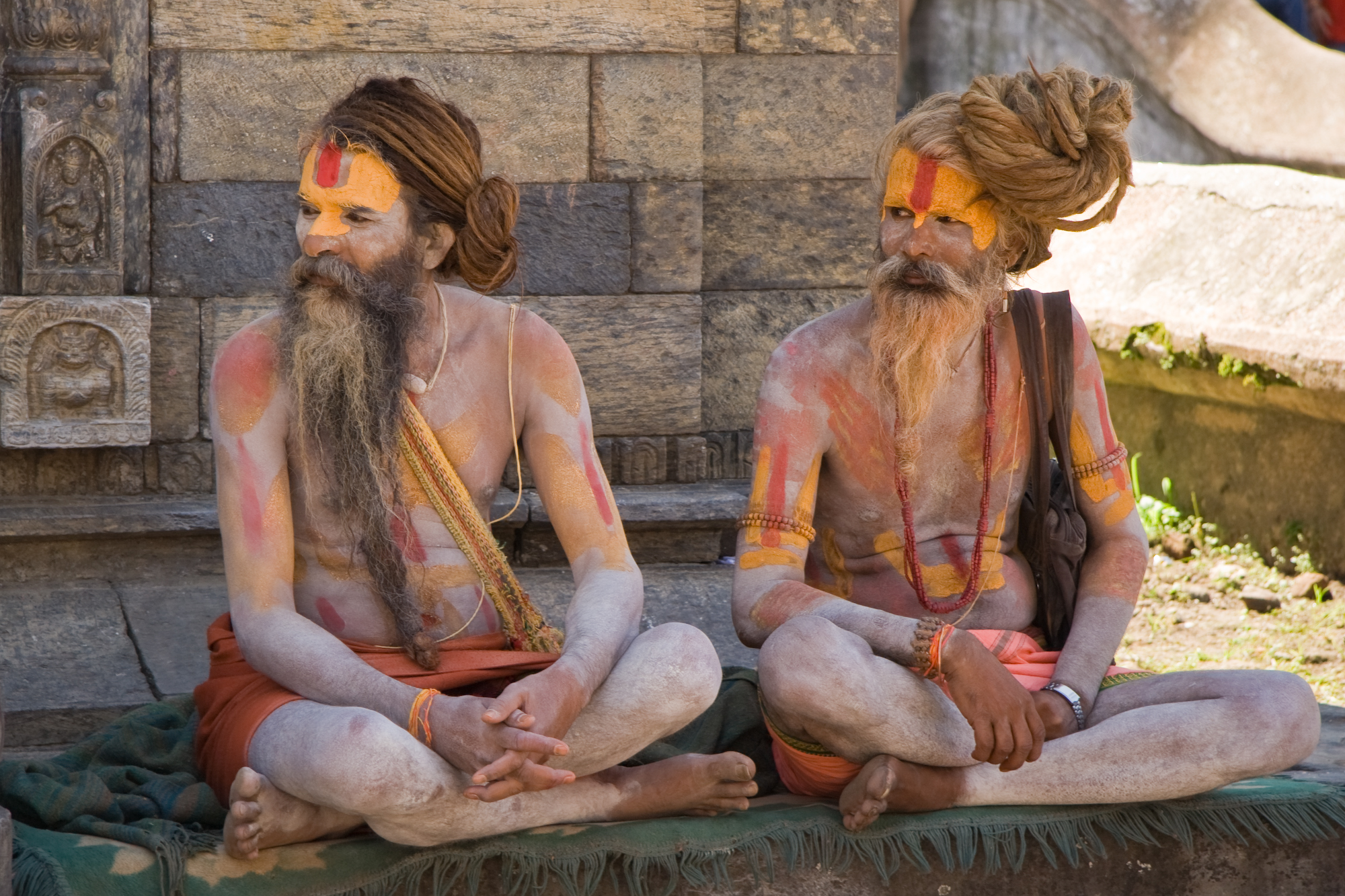
Two sadhus (ascetic monks) with their hair in traditional jaṭā style

The practice of wearing a jaṭā (dreadlocks) is observed in modern-day Hinduism, most notably by sadhus who worship Shiva.The Kapalikas, first commonly referenced in the 6th century CE, were known to wear the jaṭā as a form of deity imitation of the deva Bhairava-Shiva. Shiva is often depicted with dreadlocks. According to Ralph Trueb, "Shiva's dreadlocks represent the potent power of his mind that enables him to catch and bind the unruly and wild river goddess Ganga."

In a village in Pune, Savitha Uttam Thorat, some women hesitate to cut their long dreadlocks because it is believed it will cause misfortune or bring down divine wrath. Dreadlocks practiced by the women in this region of India are believed to be possessed by the goddess Yellamma. Cutting off the hair is believed to bring misfortune onto the woman, because having dreadlocks is considered to be a gift from the goddess Yellamma (also known as Renuka). Some of the women have long and heavy dreadlocks that put a lot of weight on their necks, causing pain and limited mobility. Some in local government and police in the Maharashtra region demand the women cut their hair, because the religious practice of Yellamma forbids women from washing and cutting their dreadlocks, causing health issues. These locks of hair dedicated to Yellamma are called jade, believed to be evidence of divine presence. In parts of Maharashtra and northern Karnataka, organised campaigns counsel women and girls with severe matted hair and their families before the hair is removed. These campaigns have also been described as the Jata Removal Movement.The goddess Angala Parameshvari in Indian mythology is said to have cataik-kari matted hair (dreadlocks). Women healers in India are identified by their locs of hair and are respected in spiritual rituals because they are believed to be connected to goddesses. A woman who has a jata is believed to derive her spiritual powers or shakti from her dreadlocks.

=== Rastafari ===
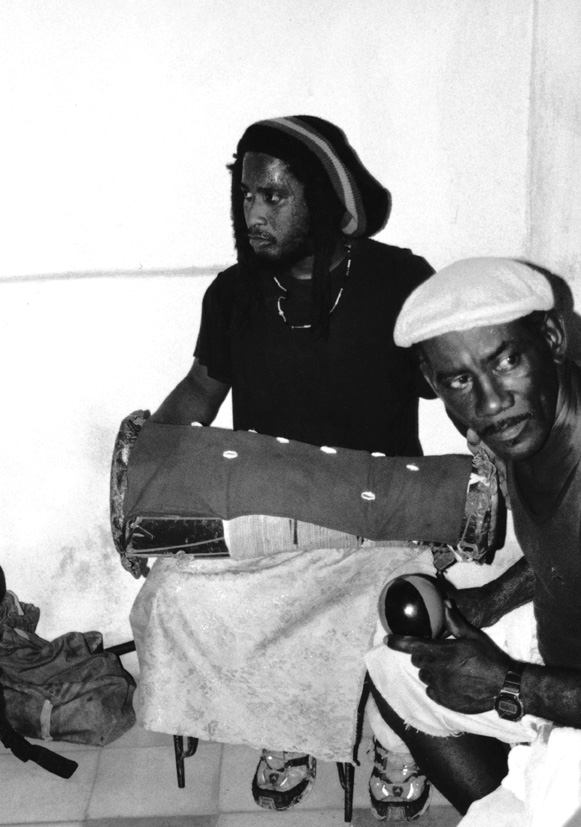
Rasta Bongo - a Rasta wearing a tam (Rastacap) to cover his locs

Rastafari movement dreadlocks are symbolic of the Lion of Judah, and were inspired by the Nazarites of the Bible. Jamaicans locked their hair after seeing images of Ethiopians with locs fighting Italian soldiers during the Second Italo-Ethiopian War. The afro is the preferred hairstyle worn by Ethiopians. During the Italian invasion, Ethiopians vowed not to cut their hair using the Biblical example of Samson, who got his strength from his seven locks of hair, until emperor Ras Tafari Makonnen (Haile Selassie) and Ethiopia were liberated and Selassie was returned from exile. Scholars also state another indirect Ethiopian influence for Rastas locking their hair are the Bahatowie priests in Ethiopia and their tradition of wearing dreadlocks for religious reasons since the 5th century AD. Another African influence for Rastas wearing locs was seeing photos of Mau Mau freedom fighters with locs in Kenya fighting against the British authorities in the 1950s. Dreadlocks to the Mau Mau freedom fighters were a symbol of anti-colonialism, and this symbolism of dreadlocks was an inspiration for Rastas to lock their hair in opposition to racism and promote an African identity. The branch of Rastafari that was inspired to lock their hair after the Mau Mau freedom fighters was the Nyabinghi Order, previously called Young Black Faith. Young Black Faith were considered a radical group of younger Rastafari members. Eventually, other Rastafari groups started locking their hair.

In the Rastafarian belief, people wear locs for a spiritual connection to the universe and the spirit of the earth. It is believed that by shaking their locs, they will bring down the destruction of Babylon. Babylon in the Rastafarian belief is systemic racism, colonialism, and any system of economic and social oppression of Black people. Locs are also worn to defy European standards of beauty and help to develop a sense of Black pride and acceptance of African features as beautiful. In another branch of Rastafari called Boboshanti Order of Rastafari, dreadlocks are worn to display a black person's identity and social protest against racism. The Bobo Ashanti are one of the strictest Mansions of Rastafari. They cover their locs with bright turbans and wear long robes and can usually be distinguished from other Rastafari members because of this. Other Rastas wear a Rastacap to tuck their locs under the cap.

The Bobo Ashanti ("Bobo" meaning "black" in Iyaric; and "Ashanti" in reference to the Ashanti people of Ghana, whom the Bobos claim are their ancestors), were founded by Emmanuel Charles Edwards in 1959 during the period known as the "groundation", where many protests took place calling for the repatriation of African descendants and slaves to Kingston. A Boboshanti branch spread to Ghana because of repatriated Jamaicans and other Black Rastas moving to Ghana. Prior to Rastas living in Ghana, Ghanaians and West Africans previously had their own beliefs about locked hair. Dreadlocks in West Africa are believed to bestow children born with locked hair with spiritual power, and that Dada children, that is, those born with dreadlocks, were given to their parents by water deities. Rastas and Ghanaians have similar beliefs about the spiritual significance of dreadlocks, such as not touching a person's or child's locs, maintaining clean locs, locs spiritual connections to spirits, and locs bestowing spiritual powers to the wearer.

=== Australia ===
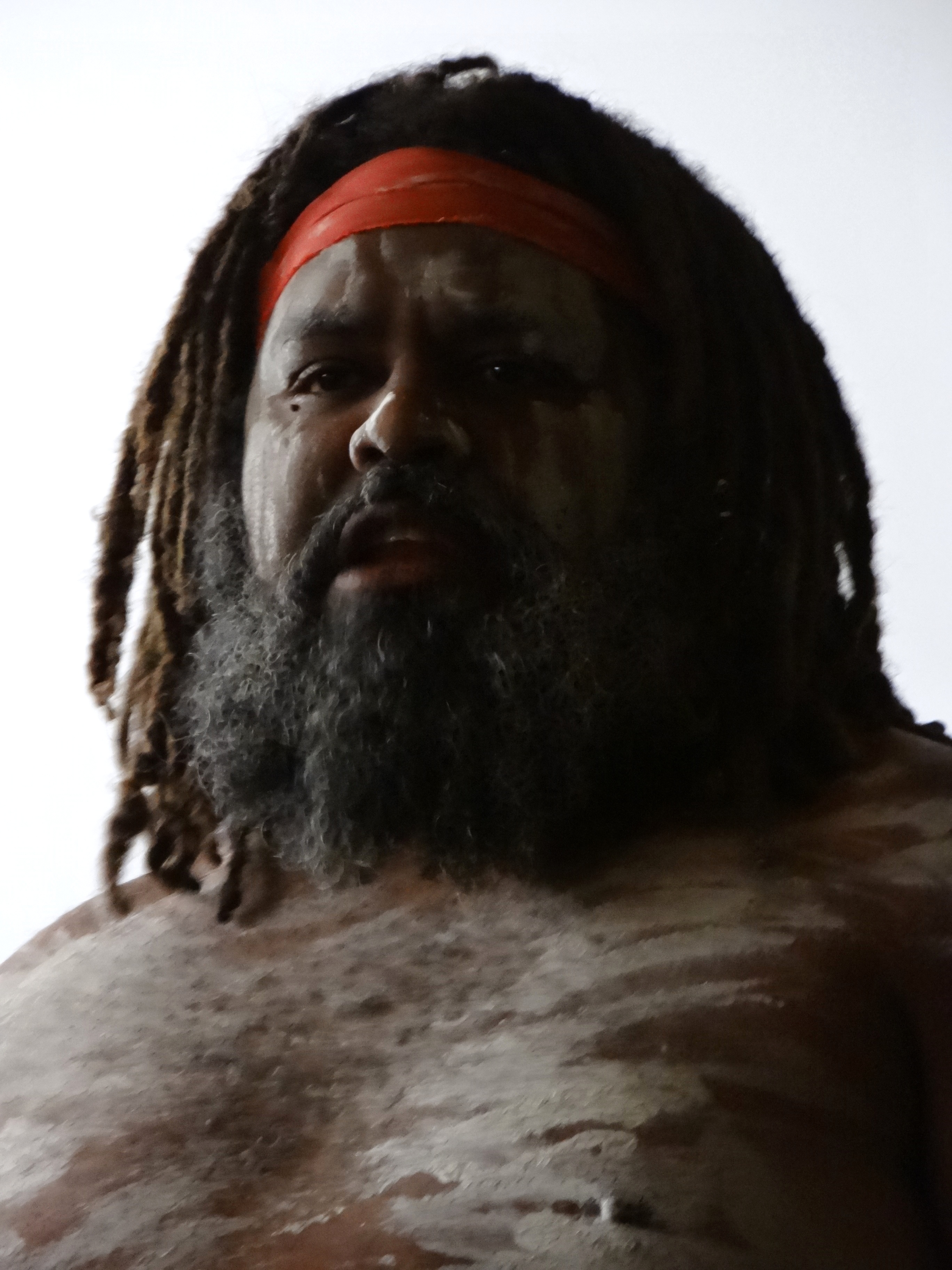
An Indigenous Australian with dreadlocks

Some Indigenous Australians of North West and North Central Australia, as well as the Gold Coast region of Eastern Australia, have historically worn their hair in a locked style, sometimes also having long beards that are fully or partially locked. Traditionally, some wear the dreadlocks loose, while others wrap the dreadlocks around their heads or bind them at the back of the head. In North Central Australia, the tradition is for the dreadlocks to be greased with fat and coated with red ochre, which assists in their formation. In 1931 in Warburton Range, Western Australia, a photograph was taken of an Aboriginal Australian man with dreadlocks.

In the 1970s, hippies from Australia's southern region moved to Kuranda, where they introduced the Rastafari movement as expressed in the reggae music of Peter Tosh and Bob Marley to the Buluwai people in the 1970s. Aboriginal Australians found parallels between the struggles of Black people in the Americas and their own racial struggles in Australia. Willie Brim, a Buluwai man born in the 1960s in Kuranda, identified with Tosh's and Marley's spiritually conscious music, and inspired particularly by Peter Tosh's album Bush Doctor, in 1978 he founded a reggae band called Mantaka after the area alongside the Barron River where he grew up. He combined his people's cultural traditions with the reggae guitar he had played since he was young, and his band's music reflects Buluwai culture and history. Now a leader of the Buluwai people and a cultural steward, Brim and his band send an "Aboriginal message" to the world. He and other Buluwai people wear dreadlocks as a native part of their culture and not as an influence from the Rastafari religion. Although Brim was inspired by reggae music, he is not a Rastafarian as he and his people have their own spirituality. Foreigners visiting Australia think the Buluwai people wearing dreadlocks were influenced by the Rastafarian movement, but the Buluwai say their ancestors wore dreadlocks before the movement began. Some Indigenous Australians wear an Australian Aboriginal flag (a symbol of unity and Indigenous identity in Australia) tied around their head to hold their dreadlocks.

=== North America and Europe ===
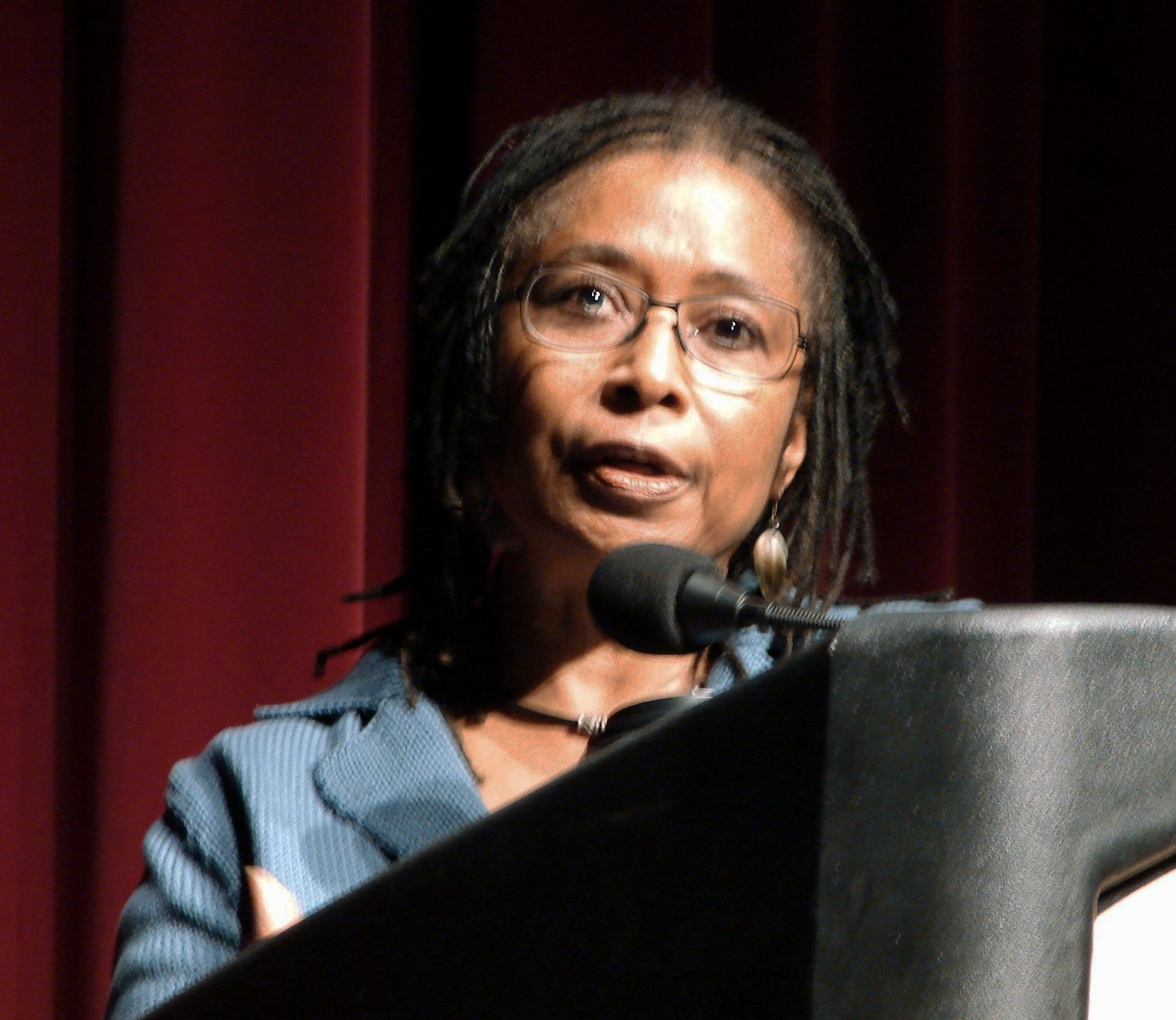
Alice Walker delivering a speech

In the African diaspora, people lock their hair to have a connection to the spirit world and receive messages from spirits. It is believed locs of hair are antennas making the wearer receptive to spiritual messages. Other reasons people lock their hair are for fashion and to maintain the health of natural hair, also called kinky hair. In the 1960s and 1970s in the United States, the Black Power movement, Black is Beautiful movement, and the natural hair movement inspired many Black Americans to wear their hair natural in afros, braids, and locked hairstyles. The Black is Beautiful cultural movement spread to Black communities in Britain. In the 1960s and 1970s, Black people in Britain were aware of the civil rights movement and other cultural movements in Black America and the social and political changes occurring at the time. Rastafari culture in Europe influenced Afro-Britons to wear their hair in natural loc styles and afros as a way to fight against racism, Western standards of beauty, and to develop unity among Black people of diverse backgrounds. From the twentieth century to the present day, dreadlocks have been symbols of Black liberation and are worn by revolutionaries, activists, womanists, and radical artists in the diaspora. For example, Black American literary author Toni Morrison wore locs, and Alice Walker wears locs to reconnect with their African heritage.

Natural Black hairstyles worn by Black women are seen as not feminine and unprofessional in some American businesses. Wearing locs in the diaspora signifies a person's racial identity and defiance of European standards of beauty, such as straight blond hair. Locs encourage Black people to embrace other aspects of their culture that are tied to Black hair, such as wearing African ornaments like cowrie shells, beads, and African headwraps that are sometimes worn with locs. Some Black Canadian women wear locs to connect to the global Black culture. Dreadlocks unite Black people in the diaspora because wearing locs has the same meaning in areas of the world where there are Black people: opposing Eurocentric standards of beauty and sharing a Black and African diaspora identity. For many Black women in the diaspora, locs are a fashion statement to express individuality and the beauty and versatility of Black hair. Locs are also a protective hairstyle to maintain the health of their hair by wearing kinky hair in natural locs or faux locs. To protect their natural hair from the elements during the changing seasons, Black women wear certain hairstyles to protect and retain the moisture in their hair. Black women wear soft locs as a protective hairstyle because they enclose natural hair inside them, protecting their natural hair from environmental damage. This protective soft loc style is created by "wrapping hair around the natural hair or crocheting pre-made soft locs into cornrows." In the diaspora, Black men and women wear different styles of dreadlocks. Each style requires a different method of care. Freeform locs are formed organically by not combing the hair or manipulating the hair. There are also goddess locs, faux locs, sister locs, twisted locs, Rasta locs, crinkle locs, invisible locs, and other loc styles.

=== Sports in the United States ===
Dreadlocks have become a popular hairstyle among professional athletes. However, some athletes are discriminated against and were forced to cut their dreadlocks. For example, in December 2018, a Black high school wrestler in New Jersey was forced to cut his dreadlocks 90 seconds before his match, sparking a civil rights case that led to the passage of the CROWN Act in 2019.

In professional American football, the number of players with dreadlocks has increased since Mike McKenzie, Al Harris and Ricky Williams first wore the style during the 1990s. In 2012, about 180 National Football League players wore dreadlocks. A significant number of these players are defensive backs, who are less likely to be tackled than offensive players. According to the NFL's rulebook, a player's hair is considered part of their "uniform", meaning the locks are fair game when attempting to bring them down.

In the NBA, former Brooklyn Nets guard Jeremy Lin, an Asian-American, garnered mild controversy over his choice of dreadlocks. Former NBA player Kenyon Martin accused Lin of appropriating African-American culture in a since-deleted social media post, after which Lin pointed out that Martin has multiple Chinese characters tattooed on his body.

Steve Turner, a former professional tennis player and current tennis coach, wears his hair in two clumped dreadlocks, as part of a Jewish mystic Nazirite vow. David Diamante, the American Boxing ring announcer of Italian American heritage, sports prominent dreadlocks.

== Formation and maintenance ==
Dreadlocks can be formed through several methods. Very curly hair forms single-strand knots that can naturally entangle into dreadlocks. For other types of hair various methods utilized to create dreadlocks include crochet hooks and backcombing. Dreadlocks should not be confused with matting, which occurs from the unintentional neglect and damage of any type of hair.

== Hair discrimination ==
=== United States ===
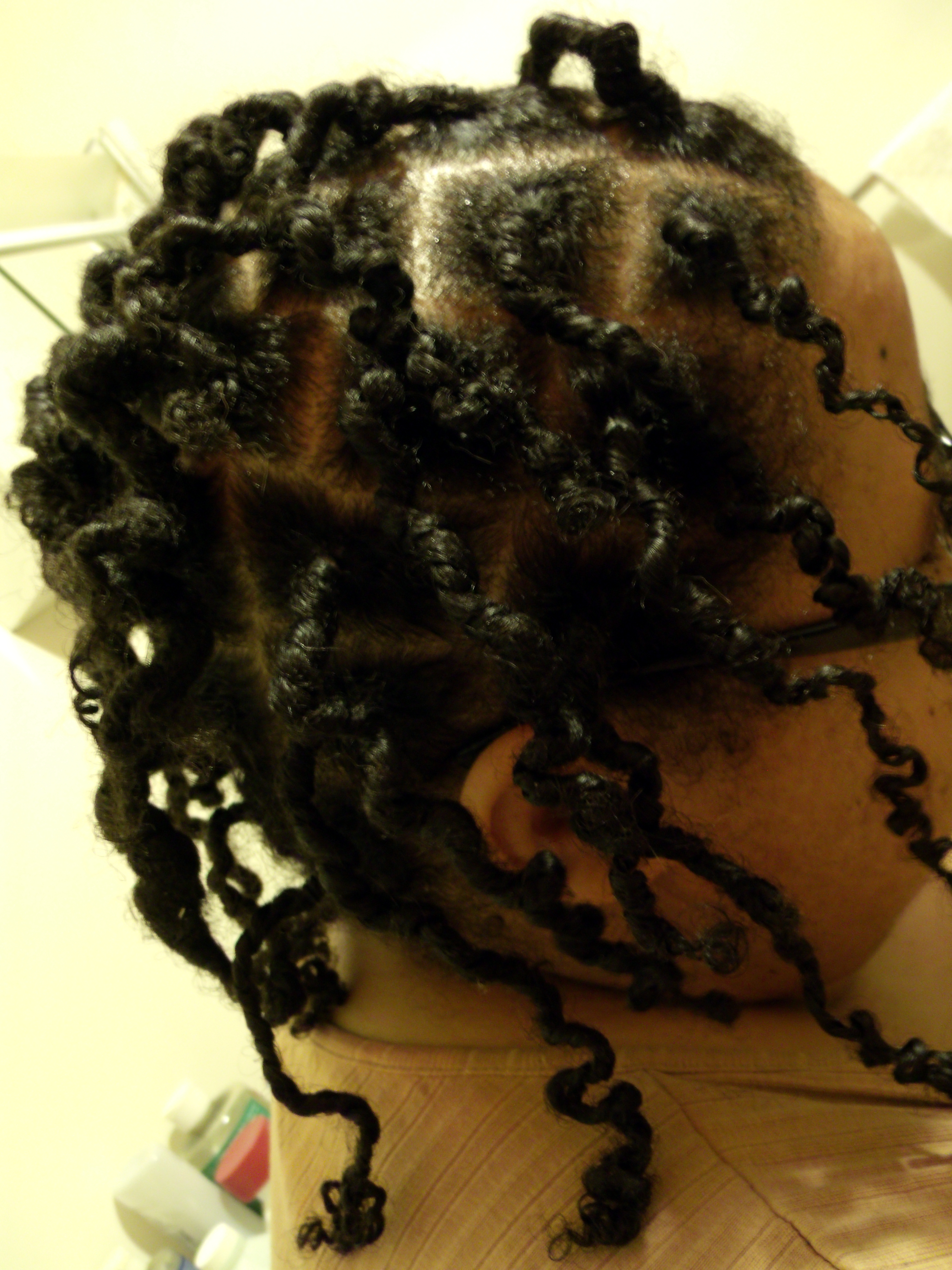
Black students in the Black diaspora are discriminated against and some are suspended from school for wearing locs.

On 3 July 2019, California became the first US state to prohibit discrimination over natural hair. Governor Gavin Newsom signed the CROWN Act into law, banning employers and schools from discriminating against hairstyles such as dreadlocks, braids, afros, and twists. Likewise, later in 2019, Assembly Bill 07797 became law in New York state; it "prohibits race discrimination based on natural hair or hairstyles". Scholars call discrimination based on hair "hairism". Despite the passage of the CROWN Act, hairism continues, with some Black people being fired from work or not hired because of their dreadlocks. According to the CROWN 2023 Workplace Research Study, sixty-six percent of Black women change their hairstyle for job interviews, and twenty-five percent of Black women said they were denied a job because of their hairstyle. The CROWN Act was passed to challenge the idea that Black people must emulate other hairstyles to be accepted in public and educational spaces. As of 2023, 24 states have passed the CROWN Act. July 3 is recognized as National CROWN Day, also called Black Hair Independence Day.

The Perception Institute conducted a "Good Hair Study" using images of Black women wearing natural styles in locs, afros, twists, and other Black hairstyles. The Perception Institute is "a consortium of researchers, advocates and strategists" that uses psychological and emotional test studies to make participants aware of their racial biases. A Black-owned hair supply company, Shea Moisture, partnered with Perception Institute to conduct the study. The tests were done to reduce hair- and racially-based discrimination in education, civil justice, and law enforcement places. The study used an implicit-association test on 4,000 participants of all racial backgrounds and showed most of the participants had negative views about natural Black hairstyles. The study also showed Millennials were the most accepting of kinky hair texture on Black people. Noliwe Rooks, a Cornell University professor who writes about the intersection of beauty and race, says "for some reason, natural Black hair just frightens some White people."

In September 2016, a lawsuit was filed by the Equal Employment Opportunity Commission against the company Catastrophe Management Solutions located in Mobile, Alabama. The court case ended with the decision that it was not a discriminatory practice for the company to refuse to hire an African American because they wore dreadlocks.

In some Texas public schools, dreadlocks are prohibited, especially for male students, because long braided hair is considered unmasculine according to Western standards of masculinity which define masculinity as "short, tidy hair." Black and Native American boys are stereotyped and receive negative treatment and negative labeling for wearing dreadlocks, cornrows, and long braids. Non-white students are prohibited from practicing their traditional hairstyles that are a part of their culture.

In 2017, the United States Army lifted the ban on dreadlocks. In the army, Black women can now wear braids and locs under the condition that they are groomed, clean, and meet the length requirements. From slavery into the present day, the policing of Black women's hair continues to be controlled by some institutions and people. Even when Black women wear locs and they are clean and well-kept, some people do not consider locs to be feminine and professional because of the natural kinky texture of Black hair.

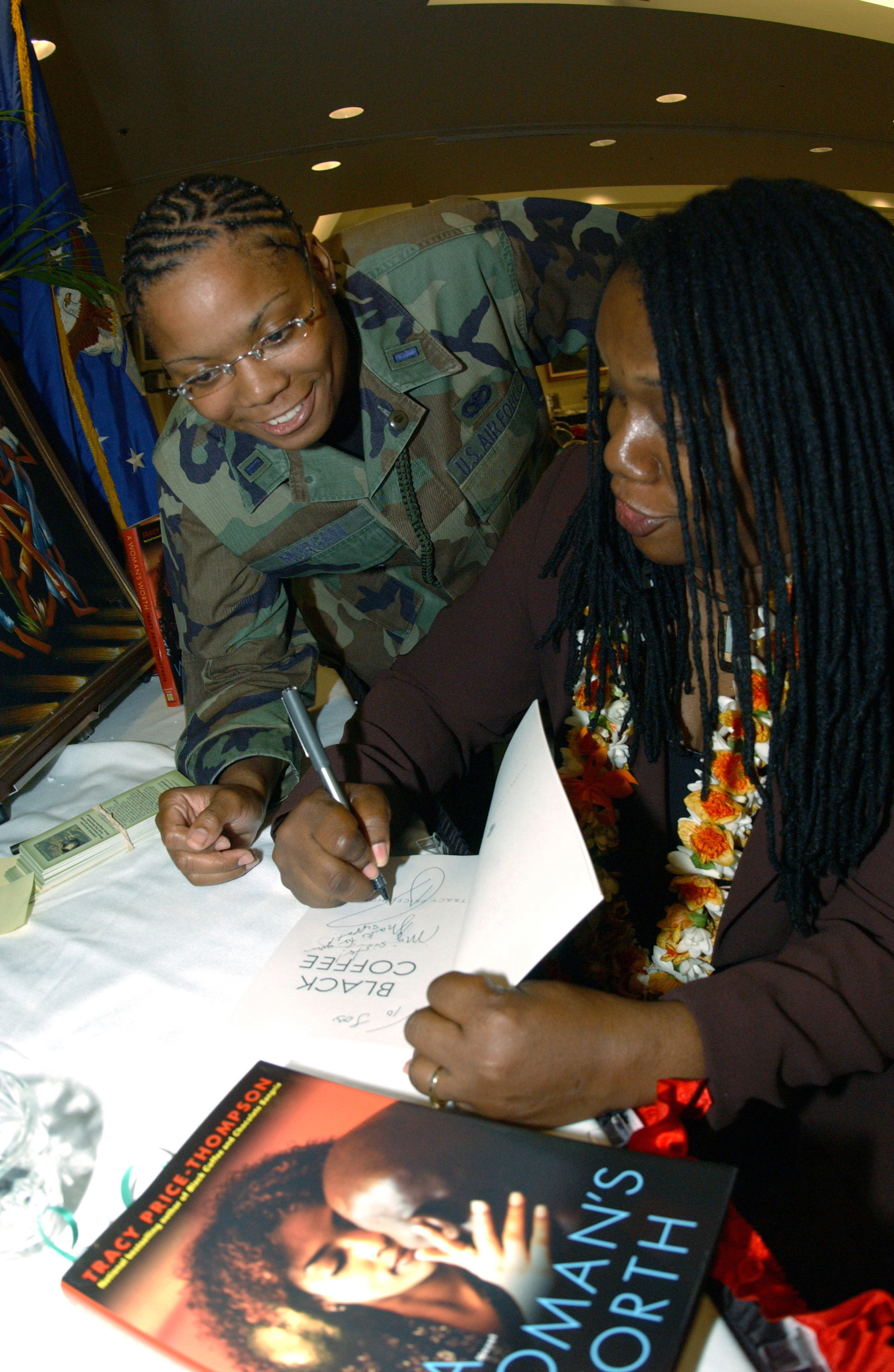
Black women in the United States Army can wear Black hairstyles.

=== Police profiling in the United States ===
According to a 2011 article from The New Republic, Black men who wear locs are racially profiled and watched more by the police and are more often believed to be "thugs" or involved in gangs and violent crimes than Black men who do not wear dreadlocks.

=== United Kingdom ===
Some Black students in England are prohibited from wearing natural hairstyles such as dreadlocks, afros, braids and twists. Black students are suspended from school, are stereotyped, and receive negative treatment from teachers. In 2022 the Equality and Human Rights Commission issued guidance that such policies, which had no exceptions on racial grounds, were "likely to be unlawful".

=== Africa ===
In Midrand, north of Johannesburg in South Africa, a Black girl was expelled from school for wearing her hair in a natural dreadlock style. Hair and dreadlock discrimination is experienced by people of color all over the world who do not conform to Western standards of beauty. At Pretoria High School for Girls in Gauteng province in South Africa, Black girls are discriminated against for wearing African hairstyles and are forced to straighten their hair.

Four African countries approved the wearing of dreadlocks in their courts: Kenya, Malawi, South Africa, and Zimbabwe. However, hairism continues despite the approval. Although locked hairstyles are a traditional practice on the African continent, some Africans disapprove of the hairstyle because of cultural taboos or pressure from Europeans in African schools and local African governments to conform to Eurocentric standards of beauty.

== Guinness Book of World Records ==
On 10 December 2010, the Guinness Book of World Records rested its "longest dreadlocks" category after investigating its first and only female title holder, Asha Mandela, with this official statement:

Following a review of our guidelines for the longest dreadlock, we have taken expert advice and made the decision to rest this category. The reason for this is that it is difficult, and in many cases impossible, to measure the authenticity of the locks due to expert methods employed in the attachment of hair extensions/re-attachment of broken-off dreadlocks. Effectively the dreadlock can become an extension and therefore impossible to adjudicate accurately. It is for this reason Guinness World Records has decided to rest the category and will no longer be monitoring the category for longest dreadlock.

== See also ==
- List of hairstyles
- Protective hairstyle
- Braids
- Box braids
- Elflock
- Cornrows
- French braid
- Polish plait

== Bibliography ==
- Sherrow, Victoria (2023). Encyclopedia of Hair: A Cultural History. Bloomsbury Publishing USA. ISBN 9781440873492.
