= Josiah Olunowo Ositelu =

Nigerian pioneer clergyman

Personal life
- Born: 1902 Ogere, Ogun State, Colonial Nigeria
- Died: 1966 (aged 63–64)
- Occupation: Clergy

Religious life
- Religion: Christianity
- Organization: Church of the Lord

Josiah Olunowo Ositelu (1902–1966) was a Nigerian clergyman and church minister best known for popularizing early religion during the Colonial Nigeria. A native of Ogere, Ogun State, Ositelu experienced a religious conversion through vision. Accused of heresy in the Church of Nigeria, he was suspended and dismissed. Ositelu founded the Church of the Lord in 1925.

Ositelu was a Yoruba descent. Following his conversion, he left his parents belief and culture to live with the Anglican priests. Born to illiterate parents, he became the founding minister of the church and performed miracles. After being removed from the church, he founded his own Church, Church of the Lord in 1925, at Ogere. After traveling through many accusations for several years conducting the Church of God-sanctioned services, he engaged more members for the denomination including his mother, who became the female women's leader. Ositelu was married and fathered many children of which Gabriel, his son also became a clergyman.

After building the Oluwaseyi Mansion in 1954, Ositelu's fame was increased in both the Northern and Eastern protectorate of Nigeria. He was also known a raid and Africa including other countries like Liberia, Ghana, Sierra Leone, United Kingdom and North America. Ositelu married seven wives from 1932 to 1949. His son Gabriel became the leader of a church and his daughter, Susannah, a prophet. Ositelu's church partner Adeleke Adejobi succeeded him as the leader of the Church of the Lord. Ositelu died on 12 July 1966.

== Early life ==
Ositelu was born in 1902 in Ogere, Ogun State, Nigeria to mother, Rebecca Ejironike and father, Dawodu Ositelu of Yoruba origin. He attended the Christ Church School, an Anglican mission school in Ijebu Ode from 1913 to 1919. During his education, he was baptized on 28 August 1914, and became the catechist of the church. In the early 1920s, Ositelu would have visited various towns in Southern Nigerian including Abeokuta, Asha, and Erukute in 1925. Ositelu separated himself for the beliefs of his parents. (Note: During this time, the 1918 influenza pandemic brought hardship in South West Nigeria. Anglican Yoruba Christians and other missionary established denominations were convinced that the pandemic was a sign of "prophetic revival", and the believers were called "Aladura". Aladura became famous and various Yoruba Christian prophets started announcing new teachings which specifically emphasized the role of the Holy Spirit in fighting against the evil.)

== Ministry ==
On 17 May 1925, Ositelu had an encounter, which was his initial exploration of becoming a clergy. While living in the Anglican mission house with other Nigerian catechists, and roommate Moses Ariyibi, he woke up in the morning and saw a bright light that contained a large eye. While in a state of shock, he woke their leader, Daddy Alangi to tell him of the vision, and he was sent back to his parents. The religious men and healers at Ogere had no explanation to the vision, that Ositelu went to Erukute for guidance. Samuel Shomoye, an Aladura leader gave him some advice which included fasting, reading, and meditating on the biblical psalms. Eventually, Ositelu declared from June to November 1925, that God repeatedly spoke to him, and consecrated him like other Prophets in the bible. Following the declaration, Ositelu's fiancée left him, and in February 1926, a council of seven Anglican priests accused him of heresy. The council suspended him on 25 February 1926, and subsequently dismissed him on 19 April of same year. Still claiming of receiving further messages from God, Ositelu went to Erukute and established his own Aladura church. In April 1927, he announced his name "Arrabablalhubab", which he used as signature, and trances in which he spoke in tongues.

In June 1929, Ositelu had a conflict with Daniel Ajayi Adefola, and returned to Ogere, where he established the Aladura Church of the Lord. He was the head from 1930 to 1966. Some Aladura leaders supported Ositelu, while many African Protestant churches found faults with him. His mother was later convinced to join the church, and she served as the leader of the female congregants until her death in 1948. Soon the church had its headquarters which Ositelu built from 1932 to 1933, as well as his residential building named Oluwaseyi Mansion in1954. Ositelu became famous and established notability in both Northern and Eastern Nigeria, other countries like Liberia, Ghana, Sierra Leone, United Kingdom and North America. Ositelu married seven wives from 1932 to 1949. His son Gabriel became the leader of a church and his daughter, Susannah, a prophet. Ositelu's church partner Adeleke Adejobi succeeded him as the leader of the Church of the Lord. Ositelu died on 12 July 1966.
