= Rastacap =

Hat associated with Rastafari

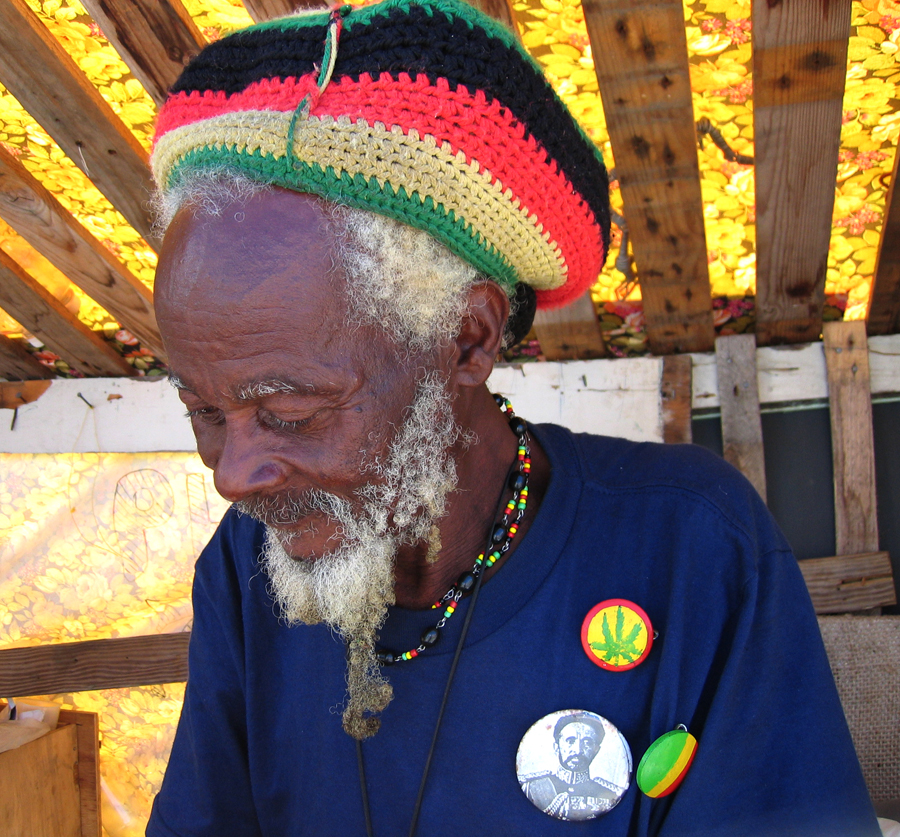
Rastafari in Barbados wearing a rastacap

The rastacap (short for "Rastafarian cap") is a type of headgear associated originally with Rastafarian culture and dreadlocks, and has evolved since then through Reggae music and Bob Marley. The rastacap is worn by Rastafaris (also called Rastas or Rastafarians) primarily as a practical way to keep their "dreadlocks" contained and protected. In this context, the term "dreadlocks" derives from the Rastafari concept of "dread": "awe and fear for Jah" (God), blended with the colonially prejudicial term "dreadful". This dual nature of the word "dreadlocks" thus describes the hair worn by Rastafarians as a spiritual symbol of their devotion to "Jah" (God), and also signifies a spiritual defense against "Babylon," the Rasta term for what they see as the oppressive Western world, its systems, and its colonial influences. Worn as a sign of their faith and connection to Jah, dreadlocks are seen as a powerful symbol of spiritual strength and independence. The practice is inspired by the biblical Nazirite vow, drawing a parallel to the story of Samson, whose strength was tied to his uncut hair. The locks are therefore seen as a source of strength, both spiritual and physical.

The rastacap can also be referred to by other terms in Jamaican patois and other Caribbean usage, such as tam, rastafar (sometimes with a silent -r), toppa, toppah, and simply cap or hat. Rastacaps range in size and shape, as well as uses. Though originally worn by Rastafarians protecting their "dreadlocks" for religious reasons, versions of the rastacap are now worn even by those less devout and even non-Rastafarians, whether for convenience or for identification with fashion, religion, Reggae, Bob Marley, socio-political statements, and a number of other associated reasons.

In construction, the rastacap is similar to the tuque, and shaped like a hairnet but generally much larger, to accommodate the full length of uncut hair and its significant weight. Most commonly crocheted from materials such as cotton or wool, the "hat" can also be knit, woven, sewn, or constructed in a number of other ways, and is often brightly colored. The traditional Rastafari colors are red, green, and gold (or yellow), with black often added as a fourth color. The colors red, green, and gold (or yellow) are derived from the flag of Ethiopia; and black is from the Pan-African movement started by Marcus Garvey. Specifically, red represents the blood of the martyrs and the struggles of Black people who were killed in the fight for liberation; gold (yellow) symbolizes the wealth and prosperity of Africa and the promise of a bright future; green represents the lush vegetation and abundance of the promised land of Ethiopia and Africa; and, black signifies the Black people and their African heritage.

== See also ==
- List of hat styles
