= Cherubim and Seraphim =

Protestant denomination in Nigeria

The Eternal Sacred Order of Cherubim and Seraphim, also known as the esocs, is a church denomination in Nigeria that was founded by Moses Orimolade Tunolase in 1925. Orimolade received considerable media attention when he allegedly healed a girl, Christina Abiodun Akinsowon, from a long-term trance in which she could neither speak nor hear. After the healing event, Orimolade Tunolase and Abiodun Akinsowon teamed up, as father and adopted daughter, and offered their services to heal and pray for people.

The Cherubim and Seraphim group claim to have dreams and visions that facilitate the connection of God and humanity. They believe that in 1925, Jesus Christ directed them to name their group "Seraphim", after the order of angels (Isaiah 6). In March 26 1926, they added "Cherubim" (also an order of angels mentioned in Isaiah 5) to the name of their church, making their congregation the Cherubim and Seraphim.

Several years after the creation of the Cherubim and Seraphim, different denominations following in its traditions broke off and formed new churches. The Church of Aladura, which began in 1930 under the lead of Josiah Oshitelu, was one of the churches that began under "similarly spectacular circumstances" as the Cherubim and Seraphim. By the 1940s, the Aladura movement church had begun to spread throughout the world, from places in Africa to other English-speaking countries, such as the United States and the United Kingdom.

== Life of the founder ==
The founder, Moses Orimolade Tunolase, was born in 1879, into the quarters of the royal family of Omoba Ode Sodi of Okorun quarters, in Ikare, Nigeria. His mother, Madam Odijoro, said that when she was pregnant, she went to the farm to cut some firewood on a particular day. When she was ready to leave, she realized she could not lift the firewood she had cut. Suddenly, she heard a voice telling her the easiest way to lift all of the firewood. She looked around but could not find anyone. Then, the voice said, "Do not be frightened, I am the child in your womb. Follow my advice and be on your way." She claimed to have been able to lift the firewood with the help of the unknown voice.

The parents had mixed feelings about how the child was behaving. "The new child stood up right after his birth and walked around the delivery place." The midwife that helped with his delivery held him down forcefully to stop him from walking. Members of the Cherubim and Seraphim believe that the force of the midwife, in addition to some incantations made by his herbalist father to calm him down on the day he was born, led to Orimolade's "prolonged paralysis". Because his father could no longer bear the embarrassment surrounding his son's birth, he asked Orimolade and his mother to leave his house for good, after which he planned to commit suicide, but was discouraged by family members. Family members claimed that it was not hard to tell that he had a little time left to live.

Not long after Orimolade and his mother left his father's house, Orimolade sent a message to his father, telling him to go to a nearby hill (now known by the Cherubim and Seraphim in Ikare as calvary) to ask for forgiveness for his sins. Certain unverified accounts claim that the message threw Orimolade's father into complete depression, which caused him to become ill. He requested that his wife be close to him on his sickbed, and he blessed her the way an elderly Yoruba man about to die would. Days after his death, he was buried "honorably."

There is an unproven claim that one night, Orimolade was in a church singing some songs of praises. Astonished by the voices, the minister, who thought they were the voices of the choir, went over to the church to ask them why they were using the church without his permission. However, upon his arrival, he found that it was just a boy, about 5 years old, singing as though he was a group of choristers. Amazed by this, the minister decided that the church should employ Orimolade to teach them spiritual songs.

After Orimolade left the church, he continued to spread the word around Nigeria, preaching in Benin, Delta, Kwara, Niger and finally Lagos, where he died in 1933. Days before his death, there were mentions of an "emblem [having] appeared in the sky, so that many stars dropped off the sky." Before his death, he prophesied that the Cherubim and Seraphim was going to spread worldwide. This prophecy seems to have come to pass, as the church is now known worldwide and has different branches under it.

== Spreading the Word ==
Orimolade claimed his calling was to go about preaching the gospel of the Lord and heal the sick. However, he felt overwhelmed by the ridicule he received from the people of Ikare because of his disability. So, he decided to pray, and he asked for God to manifest himself. Unsubstantiated sources report that in reply to his prayer, an angel appeared to him in his dreams, presenting him with a rod, which they claimed signified a "rod of victory", an insignia which represented a "power of prayer and power of speaking", and a crown which stood for "all honour and Multi-respect of every individual to bow before him to receive blessing." After Orimolade woke up, he knew his prayer had been answered. He ordered his mother to wash him, and from then on the gospel of Jesus Christ was his sole purpose.

He began his campaign when he petitioned the police to release a group of Christians who had had a clash with some traditional worshippers. It was recorded that, "He preached with so much vehemence that the earth opened its mouth ... and they were all afraid and many of them ran away, but his brother, Egunjobi did many rituals according to ancient customs to put the earth back to its former closure ... There were proclamations about the earthquake so that people from abroad came to witness the incident and [Orimolade's] name was as fearful as that of an invisible spirit." That event marked the end of hostility towards him from the people of his town.

In 1916, Orimolde left his hometown of Ikare for Irun, which was about six miles away. On getting there, he found the people celebrating the festival of Osijora, the idol they worshipped. He pulled down the images of this idol, and "opened the seal of witchcraft, and acrobatic evil worshippers." From Irun, he headed straight to Ogbagi, a nearby village, and did the same thing, after which he preached the gospel of God and showed the people what God expected from them in order to enter heaven. He continued his journey of gospel, and repeated his actions in town after town throughout Nigeria. He went to places such as Akungba, where he prayed and healed people, to Oka, where he rebuked the people for worshipping masquerades, to Kiran, with a few people from Oka carrying him on their head. He continued on to Ibilo, Merri, Ipele, and Ifon, and from Ifon they carried him to Owo. Orimolade also stopped by Benin, where they worshipped a golden statue by feeding it with human blood. He rebuked them for their actions, told them to destroy the image, told them about God, and taught them ways to worship him.

== Worship practices ==
The Cherubim and Seraphim Church base most of their worship methods and objects of worship on the New Testament of the Bible, particularly the Book of Revelation. The objects they use include candles, to represent light, backed with Revelation 3:1-3. The use of the candles also represent God as when God revealed Himself to mankind (the Israelites) on Mount Sinai as a fire, to Moses in the bush in a form of fire and multiple other instances when God revealed Himself and showed His power through fire.; rods, as a sign of authority, from Revelation 2:26-27; incense, which they believe drives away evil spirits and creates a holy and serene atmosphere for the Holy Spirit to take preeminence, from Malachi 1:11 and Revelations 5:8,8:4; and they ring bells not only as a sign of victory but also for musical purposes. Again, before any service is commenced, the most senior elder rings the bell three times. This is known as "Call To Worship". As the name suggests, it is used to call people around the Church premises to join in prayers. They also believe that the bell calls on the Heavenly Creatures to assist them in their prayers. They wear white garments as a form of uniform, and they believe that garments such as these should be the dress of the faithful, because they believe that they were what Christ wore during his suffering, crucifixion, and resurrection.

The Cherubim and Seraphim have special prayers for sick people, which are used as a form of faith healing. These prayers are led by the leaders of the church, while the sick person kneels in the middle of a circle, if they are able. During such prayers, the leader reads some selected Psalms and other Bible passages that corresponds with the situation of the sick person and the prayers going to be offered and summarizes the prayer. Each prayer is recited once or thrice, and at times recited up to seven times, depending on the seriousness of the illness. In some instances, the sick people are made to sleep in the temple for the number of days within which prayers and supplications will be made for them.

The Cherubim and Seraphim believe in the use of water and oil. They believe that water has a type of healing power, because of the strength of baptism and the spirit of God that dwells within it. They also believe in the use of consecrated oil, because it is backed by the bible in James 5:14-15. Fasting is another tradition they have. They believe it is "an injunction of Christ for support of prayers." The Cherubim and Seraphim also believe that fasting increases their spiritual strength and speeds up their success in spiritual matters. The church also has a set of taboos. They have food taboos, which place a restraint on what they can and cannot eat. Taboos include sexual immorality, drunkenness, and all works of the flesh as stated in Galatians 5:19-21, using charms, and making use of things of a magical nature.

The Cherubim and Seraphim also have special ceremonies/anniversaries, such as Holy Michael's Anniversary, which takes place on September 29 of every year. This event is used to thank God for all the victories He grants them as Holy Michael fights the battles of the faithful. It is used to acknowledge the presence of Holy Michael and his work among the Christian folks. On this day, they have a church service in which they read two lessons from the bible, from Daniel 12 and Revelations 12. Holy Gabriel's Anniversary is another special ceremony, observed on the third Thursday in August. The Anniversary of Cherubim Band is celebrated on the last Thursday in May, and the Cherubim and Seraphim wear special dresses for this sermon. They also celebrate the Anniversary of the Seraphim Band, which takes place on September 9 every year to commemorate the day the society was named in Lagos, Nigeria, in 1925. This event is also held throughout all the branches of the Church, throughout the world. On the first Friday in November, they fast throughout the day to observe the Repentant Meeting Day. They also celebrate a Day of Prayer for the Peace of Jerusalem, which takes place on the first Sunday in July. It is a day set aside for prayers for peace. It is believed that Jerusalem is the seat of Christendom; hence, by praying for the peace of Jerusalem, it is a prayer for peace for all Christendom and in the world at large. Lastly, they celebrate Love Feast, during which the church provides a meal of water and bread for the congregation, and read a few bible passages while they eat the food.

The Cherubim and Seraphim have church services throughout the week. They have special services on Sunday. On Mondays, they meet for prayers for Visioneers, Dreamers and all spiritual workers for spiritual power. On Tuesdays, they have Bible Class at 6 pm. On Wednesdays, the women meet to pray from 9am to 3pm and later in the night, the men meet to pray from 12am. On Thursdays, they have what they call "Mid-week Full Service" at 6pm. At 6 pm on Fridays, they have "Protection Mark/Sealing Service". Finally, on Saturdays, a vigil is observed from midnight until 2am.

== See also ==
- Christianity in Nigeria
- Cherubim and Seraphim Society
- New religious movement
