= Church of the Lord (Aladura) =

African Initiated Church

The Church of the Lord (Prayer Fellowship), formerly known as The Church of the Lord (Aladura) was established by Josiah Olunowo Ositelu in 1925 and inaugurated in 1930 in Ogere Remo, Ogun State, Nigeria.

"Aladura" in Yoruba means "the Praying People". They always wear white.

Also known as Aladura churches, they believe in the power of praying and in faith healing and various elements associated with Pentecostalism. Most of the founders of the churches were associated with Anglicanism, though some Methodists joined the movement as well. The churches oppose traditional African religion, and sometimes burn cult images as idols. They oppose polygamy and witchcraft. In contrast with Kimbanguism, the churches tend to avoid politics and focus instead on the holiness movement, Aladura is also known as a prophetic church: there is a prophetic gift embedded in the church as a result of constant praying, which they are known for as aladura, the praying church.

Rufus Okikiola Ositelu is the current Archbishop And Metropolitan of the Archdiocese of Nigeria and the Primate of The Church of the Lord (Prayer Fellowship) Organisation Worldwide.

== History ==
=== (Ositelu) Disciples on 27 July 1930 ===
Josiah Olunowo Ositelu founded the church in 1925, inaugurated in 1930 in Ogere Remo, Ogun State, Nigeria.

Ositelu was born on 15 May 1900 at Ogere, Ijebu-Remo, Ogun State in Nigeria.

Titus Olatunde, Joseph Aromuti, Benjamin Afolabi (from Faith Tabernacle Church, Ijebu Ode), Layide Akinyele, etc.

The first Tabieorar Festival was 10–22 August 1937.

=== Evangelism – (Cities Olunowo Ositelu pioneered) ===
Ogere (the Fountain), Ibadan, Abeokuta, Sabongidda Orra (where the Hymn "Ati 'Segun de Isegun", and "Angel Ollusegun" derived – (i.e. "from Vic-to-ry unto Vic-tory"), Ijebu Ode, Aiyepe, Sagamu, Ijebu Igbo, Sobe, etc.

Ositelu went on missionary journeys throughout Nigeria, Liberia, Ghana and Sierra Leone.

Supporters claim that Ollunowo Ositelu demonstrated God's Powers through miracles, healing, the Gospel, as well as victory and power over Satan and evil powers.

=== Owoade Adeleke Adejobi ===
Emmanuel Owoade Adeleke Adejobi succeeded Ollunowo Ositelu as the Head of the Church of the Lord (Aladura) on 7 May 1967.

During the Mount Tabborrar Festival on 22 August 1945, Ollunowo Ositelu read a message he claimed to have received from God on 18 August 1945:

"Adeleke Adejobi is the Gbolahan (Torch Bearer) of the Church of the Lord Aladura".

Ollunowo Ositelu also promoted and appointed Adeleke Adejobi prophet and apostle on the Mount on the same day, and pronounced that Adeleke Adejobi would be his successor.

In January 1966, presiding over the first International Churches Assembly at Ogere, Ollunowo Ositelu read again in his address his vision of 18 August 1945 in which he said God told him that Adeleke Adejobi was to be his successor. Ositelu confirmed before the house his implicit faith, confidence and trust in Adeleke Adejobi, and declared him his successor.

Josiah Ollunowo Ositelu died in July 1966.

On Sunday, 7 May 1967, Adeleke Adejobi was inaugurated as the second Primate of the Church of the Lord Aladura.

== Tenets ==
The Six Tenets of the church can be described as:

- Pentecostal in Power
- Prophetic in Ministry
- Biblical in Pattern
- Evangelical in Mission
- Ecumenical in Outlook and
- Social in Responsibility

== Affiliations ==
- World Council of Churches (WCC) 1975
- All African Conference of Churches (AACC) 1975
- Organization of African Instituted Churches (OAIC) 1978
- British Council of Churches (BCC) 1979
- Christian Association of Nigeria (CAN) 1984
- Christian Council of Nigeria (CCN) 1988
- International Ministerial Council of Great Britain (IMCGB) 1993
- founding member of the International Ministerial Council of Germany (IMCOG) 1994
- Afro-Caribbean Churches in the UK (ACCUK).
- founding member of the Council of African Christian Communities in Europe (CACCE) 1999
- founding member of the International Convent of Christian Congregations, Rhein-Main, Germany (ICCCRG) 1999
- founding member and initiator of United Aladura Churches (UAC) 2004

In 1996 the Church hosted a WCC Consultative Meeting with African Instituted Churches at Ogere-Remo, Ogun State, Nigeria

In 2010 the Primate of the Church of the Lord (Prayer Fellowship) Worldwide [TCLPFW], Rufus Okikiola Ositelu, was proclaimed and inaugurated as the Pope of the Aladura Communion Worldwide [ACW], with style "His Holiness, Pope Dr. Rufus Ositelu I".

== Provincial offices ==
- Lome, Togo
- Kumasi, Ghana
- Wellington, Freetown, Sierra Leone
- London, England
- Bronx, New York, United States of America
- Frankfurt am Main, Germany
- Sevila, Spain
- Luxembourg
- Griffen Glen Way, Republic of Ireland

== See also ==
- Aladura
- List of Christian denominations by number of members

== References and Bibliography ==
- Rufus Okikiolaolu Olubiyi Ositelu, African Instituted Churches: Diversities, Growth, Gifts, Spirituality and Ecumenical Understanding of African Initiated Churches, Series no.:18 Beiträge zur Missionswissenschaft und interkulturellen Theologie Bd. 18, 2002, 232 Pages., br., ISBN 3-8258-6087-6
- John S. Pobee and Gabriel Olusegun Ositelu, African Initiatives in Christianity: The growth, gifts and diversities of indigenous African churches, A challenge to the ecumenical movement, Risk Book Series no.: 83, Geneva : WCC Publications, 1998, 73 Pages, br., ISBN 2-8254-1277-5
