= Cherubim and Seraphim Society =

Christian denomination from Nigeria

The Cherubim and Seraphim Society is a Christian denomination from Nigeria. It was founded by Saint Moses Orimolade, and Mother Captain Abiodun who was the first person to fall in to a trance in the sacred fold of Cherubim and Seraphim. The society is one of the Aladura churches. It has been claimed that the Cherubim and Seraphim Society was founded in 1925, and that a split from the founders [Baba Moses Orimolade and Captain Abiodun Emanuel] led to the formation of several other (major and minor) divisions of the Cherubim and Seraphim fold.

Its headquarters is in Lagos, Nigeria. The Holy Mary Cathedral Church (Lagos) was built in 1951. The denomination is also present in Northern Nigeria. Other countries with branch churches include Senegal, the United Kingdom and the United States. Angels, in particular the Archangel Michael, are central to the churches beliefs.

== See also ==
- Nigerian sectarian violence
- Cherubim and Seraphim (Nigerian church)
- Eternal Sacred Order of Cherubim and Seraphim
