= Helene Nomsa Brath =

American community organizer, activist, and artist

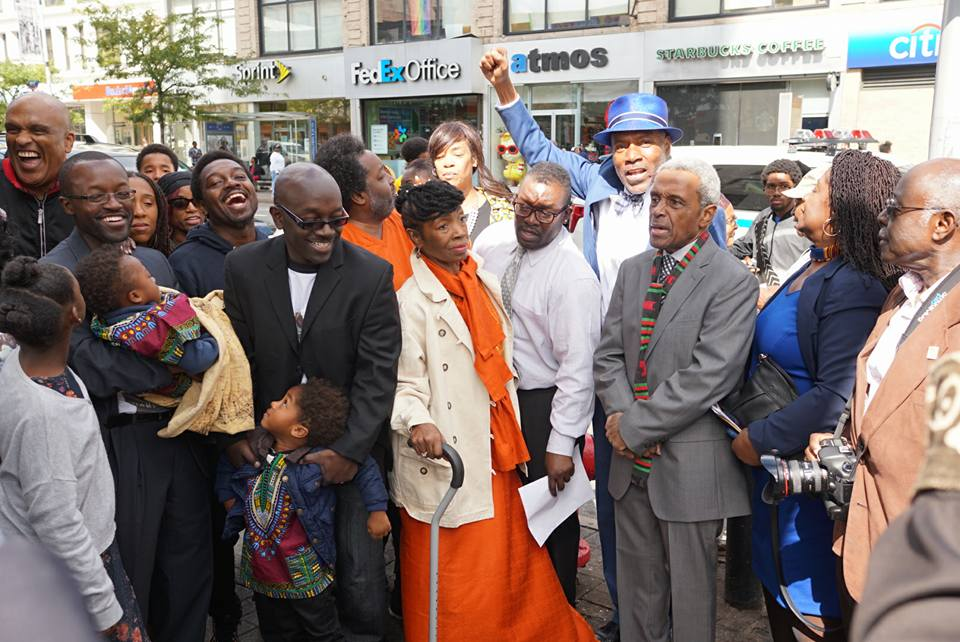
- Helene Nomsa Brathwaite Street naming
- Born: Helene White; March 15, 1942; New York, New York
- Died: October 30, 2023 (aged 81)
- Other names: Nomsa Brath; Helene Nomsa Brathwaite
- Occupations: Community organizer, education reformer, activist, public speaker, artist
- Known for: Founding member of the Grandassa Models
- Spouse: Elombe Brath
- Children: 6
- Website: www.elombebrathfoundation.org

Helene Nomsa Brath was a community organizer, education activist, public speaker, and artist. She was married to and worked with her husband Elombe Brath for more than 50 years. They were both pioneers in Black Arts Movement and the Black is beautiful movement in the 1960s. In the 1960s, Nomsa was one of the founding members of the Grandassa Models.

Helene Nomsa Brath is also known as Helene Nomsa Brathwaite.

Nomsa Brathwaite, Cinque Brathwaite and Kwame Brathwaite are co-founders of the Elombe Brath Foundation. The sale of some of Nomsa's paintings were sold to fund the nonprofit charity created in honor of her husband, Elombe Brath.

== Early life ==
Nomsa's birth name was Helene White. Her childhood mentor was Goldie Seifert. Goldie was a scholar and the wife of Charles Christopher Seifert. Charles was a scholar in history, and specialist in African and African-American history most notable for his motto "A Race without the knowledge of its history is like a tree without roots." Nomsa credits Goldie with instilling in her the love for reading, books, and independent thinking. Charles was a collector of books. The Seiferts created a library in their home to educate the Black community.

== Career ==
Helene Nomsa Brathwaite, is known by many monikers, including her maiden name, Helene White, and Nomsa Brath. She was the wife of Elombe Brath, who was an International Pan Africanist and Pioneer of the Black Arts Movement. For many years Nomsa Brath was an activist in education in New York City.

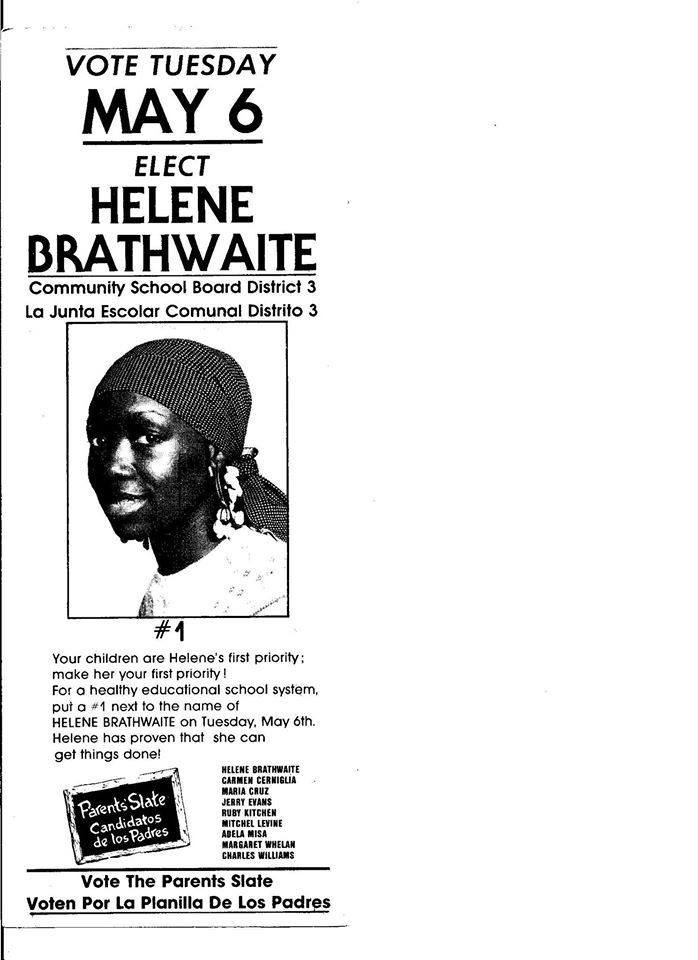
Helene Nomsa Brathwaite

=== Education reformer ===
In 1994 to 2003 Nomsa was an advocate for education reform. She has part of a panel discussion hosted by Hugh Bernard Price, who was the president of the National Urban League. On the panel Nomsa represented the voice of the parents for education reform. The panel discussion appeared on C-SPAN in the 1997 forum on U.S. Education of Urban Residents. In the 1990s, she represented Partners for Reform in Math and Science (PRISM) for several years. As an educational reformer, and advocating within the educational system Nomsa turned to homeschooling, and homeschooled her 5th child. He scored very high in the SAT test. After homeschooling her 5th child he went back into the public school system, and attended the Bronx High School of Science, which was one of New York City's specialized high school at the time. She also home-schooled her sixth child. After home-schooling her fifth and sixth children, she became a volunteer teacher for community children.

=== Grandassa Model - Pioneers of the Black is Beautiful movement ===
In 1956, the Jazz-Art Society was formed. It was renamed the African Jazz-Art Society & Studios – AJASS. The African Jazz Arts Society Studio (AJASS) comprised organizers Elombe Brath, Kwame Brathwaite, Robert Gumbs, Frank Adu, Chris Asmandeces Hall, David K. Ward, Leroy "Satch" Giles, Jimmy Abu Williams, and Ernest Baxter. AJASS productions started in Harlem. They produced art exhibitions and African cultural presentations. AJASS was a forerunner of what latter became known as "The Black Arts Movement." They produced jazz concerts and AJASS started the Grandassa Models, and the theme was “Black Is Beautiful.” They were influenced by Carlos A. Cooks, and the African Nationalist Pioneer Movement (ANPM). The (ANPM) grew out of the Marcus Garvey's Universal Negro Improvement Association and African Communities League UNIA Movement. Which influenced the creation of Grandassa Models. The UNIA hosted on Garvey Day, August 17 of each year, a "Miss Natural Standard of Beauty Contest."

Helene White was one of the original Grandassa Models in the Naturally '62 beauty and fashion show. She was featured as the cover girl on numerous jazz album covers by Lou Donaldson. Her popularity led her to be featured internationally on magazine covers in Africa highlighting Black women in the United States, wearing their hair in its natural state. Grandassa models represented natural African American standards of beauty. They were on magazine covers, and album covers in the United States as beauty icons. Nomsa became an icon for Black female empowerment in the New York Citizen Call Newspaper cartoon strip. The newspaper was a strong voice for the black community during the 1950s and 60's. The early 1980s brought Nomsa Brath's popularity to light when she was caricatured into a Grandassa Logo by her husband, Elombe Brath, on event fliers. Afterward, these fliers were distributed in Harlem for cultural political events, highlighting the voice of the urban community.

The "Naturally" beauty shows continued through the 1980s regularly, and later became commemorative events.

=== Asbestos removal in schools pioneer ===
Nomsa was an advocate for the removal of asbestos from schools in New York City public schools. In 1985 the Journal of Law and Education highlighted Helene Brathwaite's asbestos removal advocacy work in the New York City Public Schools in New York City. Her work and efforts along with others led to shut down of unsafe primary and grade schools in the 1970s. She was President of the Parents Teacher Association and Chairperson of the Parents' Committee of PS 185/208. Her children and her neighbors' children attended the schools that were shut down due to the hazards of asbestos. It was known that 20% of the schools in New York City had asbestos, and the risk of mesothelioma to younger children had not been properly addressed.

Many school buildings were constructed containing asbestos before federal asbestos regulations were put in place. It was a natural mineral used in the construction industry and in the buildings of schools. It was later recognized as a disease-causing danger, linked to illnesses, like mesothelioma. Nomsa researched and learned the dangers of asbestos. Her research led her to work with the superintendent and stress the importance of closing the schools down. Along with pushing to close the asbestos-filled school buildings down, Nomsa urged the superintendent to bus children to different schools throughout New York that were free of any asbestos problems. The financial toll the NYC school system and New York had to endure was a litmus test for what could happen if parental advocacy was realized in other schools. Since then, Federal guidelines have been enhanced, clarified, and expanded.

Today, The Environmental Protection Agency, EPA, is responsible for outlining and enforcing federal laws related to asbestos in school buildings. The Asbestos Hazard Emergency Response Act (AHERA) requires mandatory inspections of buildings for the presence of asbestos and the creation of management plans to prevent or reduce the risks of asbestos exposure. However, neither the EPA nor AHERA requires that schools remove the asbestos found after inspections. The loophole for schools around removing asbestos is that they only need an in-place plan to manage to reduce the risks of exposure. The law states that asbestos does not typically need to be removed. It only needs to be removed from the building when it is seriously damaged or when it is at risk of being disturbed by renovation or demolition.

In open letters from The United Federation of Teachers to parents and educators, the UFT stated how Nomsa Brath, single-handedly forced The Board of Education to accept findings of how scientists have known of the dangers of asbestos for years.

=== Case of the Central Park 5 ===
Nomsa Brath was one of the major organizers in the high-profile cases in New York City known as the Central Park Jogger case. Five African American youth were indicted, and became known as the Central Park 5.

Nomsa founded a group called "Mother Love" composed of mothers and female activists who organized for the support the innocence of the five teenagers who were alleged to have attacked the female jogger on the night of April 19, 1989. Nomsa and others believed in the innocence of the young men. "Mother Love" were supporters of the Central Park 5. The media at the time expressed empathy for the jogger. The case polarized New York City. Inflamed rhetoric and newspaper ads were published. Donald Trump took out ads calling for the death penalty for the five young men.

Many saw the media as rushing to judgment. "Mother Love" did a media and press campaign for justice. Nomsa's husband Elombe and his involvement in media communications of television and radio helped to publicize the injustices.

In 2002, the five young men known in the media as the Central Park 5 were exonerated due to the confessions of Matias Reyes. Reyes, a convicted murderer and serial rapist, was in prison and confessed to raping the jogger. DNA evidence confirmed his guilt. He stated that he acted alone in the killing of the Central Park Jogger.

Nomsa's work and advocacy on this case appear in books by three different authors. Black Women in America edited by Kim Marie Vaz, High-Profile Crimes by Lynn S. Chancer, and The Central Park Five: A Chronicle of a City Wilding by Sarah Burns, which addressed Nomsa's significance in this case. Sarah Burns, the author of the latter book, is the daughter of Kenneth Lauren Burns, a documentary filmmaker. Sarah and Ken are the producers of the 2012 documentary of the Central Park 5. The film suggests that Prosecutor Elizabeth Lederer of the New York District Attorney's Office poked little holes of doubt in every witness’ testimony. In the miniseries about Central Park 5 directed by Ava DuVernay and released in April 2019, When They See Us, Nomsa Brath was played by actress Adepero Oduye. Jeff Skoll and Jonathan King from Participant Media, Oprah Winfrey/Harpo Productions Films, Jane Rosenthal and Berry Welsh from Tribeca Productions and DuVernay are the executive producers of the movie When They See Us.

In 2008, Nomsa had a stroke that restricted her activism and painting.
