= George Edward Tait =

American poet, writer and educator

- Born: December 29, 1943; Oakland, California
- Died: November 5, 2017 (aged 73)
- Education: Pace University B.A. in English Language and Literature and a minor in French Language
- Occupations: Educator, historian, mentor, tutor,
- Spouse: Akosua Tait
- Children: Damani, Sekou and Kamani Tait.

George Edward Tait (December 29, 1943 – November 5, 2017) was an American poet, writer, educator, storyteller, journalist, activist, historian, public speaker, tutor, bandleader, musician, and performer. He was known as the Poet Laureate of Harlem, and a part of the Black Arts Movement. He was the author of At Arms and The Baker's Dozen: Selected Dance Poems. He spearheaded a musical poetry group called Black Massical Music from 1972 to 1977. He founded The Society of Afrikan Poets. His definition of music is the poetry of sound. He died on November 5, 2017. Tait has been writing and teaching for over thirty five years, and known for having poetry readings and workshops. He taught at writing at universities, juvenile detention centers, senior centers, community centers, libraries and theaters. He is the author of the Black Brigade. George Edward Tait was secretary of the Afrikan Nationalist Pioneer Movement which was founded by Carlos A. Cooks.

== Early life ==
George E. Tait was born in Oakland, California. He was raised in Harlem, New York City.

== Career ==
Edward Tait graduated from Pace University in 1968 with a B.A. in English. He minored in French and literature. He was a member of the Pace University literary society and the Pace Press. He was an English teacher at Queens College, in Queens (New York City) He is the author of Sword Songs: Selected Poetry published in 2010. In 1975, he founded The Society of Afrikan Poets. Which produced a seven-year Wednesday series of weekly poetry readings entitled Black Words. The series lasted till 1982. The series featured well known activists, artists, poets, and scholars; such as Jayne Cortez, Amiri Baraka, Elombe Brath, Abbey Lincoln (her adopted name Aminata Moseka), Abiodun Oyewole, Black Rose, Abiola Sinclair, Queen Mother Moore, Sekou Sundiata, John Watusi Branch, David Nelson The Last Poets, Abiodun Oyewole, Cheryl Byron, Sonia Sanchez, Quincy Troupe, Preston Wilcox, Carlos Russell, Queen Mother Moore, Louis Reyes Rivera, Rosemari Mealy, Dr. Lonnetta Marie Taylor-Gaines, Leon Thomas, Ruth Garnett, Duma Ndlovu, Jemisi Obanjoko, Ron Welburn.

Edward Tait was Poet Laureate of The Black Nation by the Republic of New Afrika, Poet Laureate of Harlem, Poet-in-Residence of Langston Hughes Library Community Library and Cultural Center, Poet Laureate of the National Conference of Artists, Poet Laureate of the School of African Philosophy, Poet-in-Residence of the Genesis II Museum of International Black Culture, and Resident Poet of Attitude - The Dancer's Magazine.

In 1982 two of his poems were published in Steppingstones: A Literary Anthology Toward Liberation, edited by James B. Gwynne. He taught at Malcolm-King College in New York City from 1981 to 1986. While at Malcolm-King College he published his first volume of poetry 'At War', in 1983.

In 1990 George Tait was one of the organizers in Brooklyn's Crown Heights boycott of two Korean produce stores known as Family Red Apple boycott, and boycotts in Harlem. Tait was a part of the "Buy Black Campaign".

In 2001, he was a contributing writer to the anthology Bum Rush The Page: A Def Poetry Jam. Which was edited by Tony Medina and Louis Reyes Rivera.

In 2003, he was published in Dance Giant Steps, Three Baker's Dozen: Selected Dance Poetry.

== Quote ==
"Midnight Rounds" a poem written by George Edward Tait for his wife Akosua. "Out of the nucleus of nature she is a nimbus in the night Her vintage voice filling the vaporized void with veracity." And women, if you want to read real love poems, try "A Dance for Akosua" and "Dance of Destiny." Hear love married to mission and mission married to Spirit: "Let us dance, my dear: Dance with purpose and power Dance with productivity and pride Dance with the passion of Providence & with the potency of prayer."

"Swashbuckler's Song"

"The pen is longer than the sword Is what the jurists think; The pen is stronger than the sword Is what the purists think. So I duly dip my pen in blood While I soak my sword in ink".

By George Edward Tait
