= Grandassa Models =

Part of Black is Beautiful movement

Grandassa Models were a part of a Black is Beautiful movement started by Kwame Brathwaite and Elombe Brath, which centered on natural Black beauty. They attracted African-American females who represented their standards of "Black is Beautiful" and were part of the Black is Beautiful movement from 1962 to 1979. The Grandassa Models participated in the "Miss Natural Standard of Beauty Contests" based in Harlem, New York City, and were hosted each year on Marcus Garvey Day, August 17.

== History ==
The original Grandassa Models were Clara Lewis, Black Rose, Helene Nomsa Brath, Priscilla Bardonille, Mari Toussaint, Esther Davenport, Wanda Sims, and Beatrice Cramston, and Jean Gumbs. Members wore their hair naturally, which was considered taboo in the 1950s, and represented a range of body sizes and skin colors.

"It was revolutionary. During that time – the 1950s and 60s – it was unacceptable to wear your hair in any natural hairstyle. The point that was being made was that you can be your natural self and be proud of who you are, and not accept another person’s standard of beauty as your own." - Kwame Jr., Kwame Brathwaite's son and Director of Archives for the Kwame Brathwaite Archive

Further, AJASS was "invested in a body positive movement that celebrated the thick, curvaceous bodies of Black women at a time when ultra-thin models Twiggy and Jane Shrimpton were the body type du jour in the high fashion industry," says Dr. Tanisha Ford, Associate Professor of Africana Studies and History at the University of Delaware. "These women were saying no, we want to embrace our curves. We want to embrace our full noses, our full of lips."

Models designed and made their own clothes and worked exclusively with Black beauty businesses.

=== The African Jazz-Art Society & Studio ===
The African Jazz-Art Society & Studio (AJASS) was formed in 1956 by a group of young African American artists, designers, musicians, hairdressers, writers, and jazz enthusiasts. It was initially called the Jazz-Art Society and was later remained the African Jazz-Art Society & Studios. Organizers included Elombe Brath, Kwame Brathwaite, Robert Gumbs, Afrank Adu, Chris Acemandese Hall, David K. Ward, Ernest Baxter, and Jimmy Abu Williams producing jazz concerts, art exhibitions, and cultural events. The concerts featured many artists that later become renowned, such as Lou Donaldson, Jackie McLean, Gigi Gryce, Johnny Griffin, Cannonball Adderley, Hank Mobley, Junior Cook, Art Taylor, Philly Joe Jones, Betty Carter, Leon Thomas, Wilbur Ware, and others. The organization was influenced by Carlos A. Cooks, leader of the African Nationalist Pioneer Movement (ANPM) which developed out of Marcus Garvey's UNIA.

=== Naturally 62 ===
In January 1962, the African Jazz-Art Society & Studio and Grandassa Models gave a fashion show was in the basement of Harlem night club, Purple Manor, on East 125th street. The show was called Naturally 62 and one of the first to feature amateur models. In the early sixties, African Americans wore their hair pressed to straighten by a hot comb whereas the models' hair was natural and they had dark skin.

The Naturally shows were created to develop racial pride, African culture, poetry, art, and standards of beauty. AJASS shows traveled to colleges and universities in the United States of America and produced with Abbey Lincoln and Max Roach. They were also a part of the Black Arts Movement, along with Larry Neal, Ed Bullins, and Leroy Jones (later Amiri Baraka) that created theater in Harlem.

Ann Tripp, News Director for the Steve Harvey show and WBLS/WLIB Radio, is quoted as saying that "they were forerunners of the natural hair movement... We tried to make black people feel proud of who they were, no matter what complexion or hair type."

AJASS continued to hold "Naturally" beautiful shows regularly thru and 1980s, and then ten year anniversaries until 2002.

In 1963, AJASS created The Black Standard Publishing Company. They published two booklets: "Naturally '63 Portfolio, and later in 1963 "Color Us Cullud", the AJASS theater company.

On September 22, 2018 in Harlem, the Elombe Brath Foundation and the Harlem Arts Alliance presented a tribute to the Grandassa Models, as the pioneers of the "Black is Beautiful" movement.
