= African-American beauty =

Aspect of African-American culture

African Americans and their skin color and hair were once considered unattractive. Black women and their bodies have been devalued and rejected by ideal beauty standards.

== Defining African-American beauty ==
African American beauty focuses on the beauty of African Americans, as notions pertaining to beauty are examined differently by various cultures and societies. Similarly to other cultures, ideals of beauty within African-American communities have shifted throughout the years. Influenced by Eurocentric perspectives and White supremacism, lighter skin and eye color as well as straight hair have long been considered the most desirable characteristics by different racial groups in the U.S., including African Americans.

== History ==
White Europeans historically considered Africans to be 'grotesque' and 'inferior', and would traffic them for slavery. English settlers deemed coiled African hair as unattractive and a mark of their inferiority.

Racialized perspectives on beauty which led to lighter skin tones being considered desirable characteristics by different groups including African Americans can be traced back to slavery. The view of lighter skin tones as the ideal beauty standard are linked to colorism, which affects African Americans perceptions of themselves, with African women being disproportionately affected.

== Beauty standards ==
Despite some similarities between how African Americans and other groups view beauty, African Americans also view beauty as seen in body ideals as not being limited to one specific type that has been portrayed in the media. This view of beauty transcends the physical perception of beauty and recognizes that beauty is not limited to physical characteristics only.

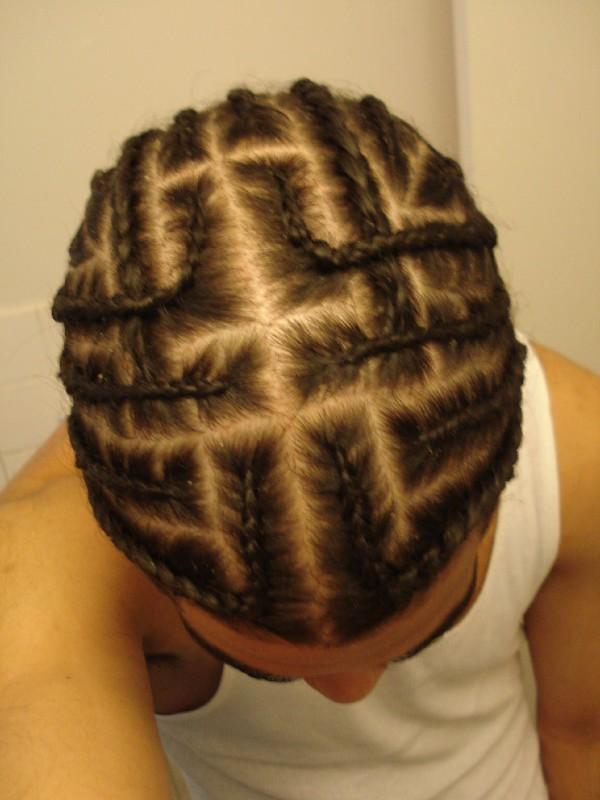
Cornrow hairstyle

=== Hair ===
African American hair has been politicized.

=== Effects of beauty standards ===
Similar to other minority groups, African Americans have been subject to Western beauty ideals which portray slim body types as the standard to aspire to. The portrayal of slim body types as the ideal in Western beauty ideals has been linked to various eating disorders. There have been limited studies that show the effects of Western beauty ideals and the resulting eating disorders amongst African Americans.

== Media ==
African American beauty takes into consideration the intersectionality of African Americans and how this intersectionality has affected the representation of African Americans in media, which plays a significant role in communicating what society's beauty standards are.

Portrayals of straight hair in the media have set a beauty standard which is exclusionary of the different hair textures of African Americans. Despite the role played by media in setting beauty standards for hair, social media has provided a platform for African Americans who are progressing beauty standards by wearing their hair in different states, including its natural state.

== Appropriation of African American women's beauty ==
White women such as Kylie Jenner on social media have been darkening their skin, getting lip augmentation, breast augmentation and buttock augmentation and wearing traditional black hairstyles such as dreadlocks, braids, cornrows and afros to profit for being a "sex symbol". Black bodies were hypersexualized and white women are emulating these features to be considered desirable by the media. A white Swedish Instagram model named Emma Hallberg often darkens her skin to led people to believe to she is black or mixed-race. It has been dubbed the "Kardashian effect". Kim Kardashian's large buttocks have increased the popularity of white women getting Brazilian butt lift surgery. In 2021, white Australian rapper Iggy Azalea was accused of blackfishing for darkening her skin in her music video for “I Am The Strip Club”. Jesy Nelson, Ariana Grande, Bhad Bhabie, Alabama Barker and Rita Ora were also accused of mimicking African American women.

== Beauty products ==
Shea butter and African black soap are popular African American skincare products.

== See also ==
- African-American hair
- Black is Beautiful
- Blackfishing
