= Adepero Oduye =

American actress

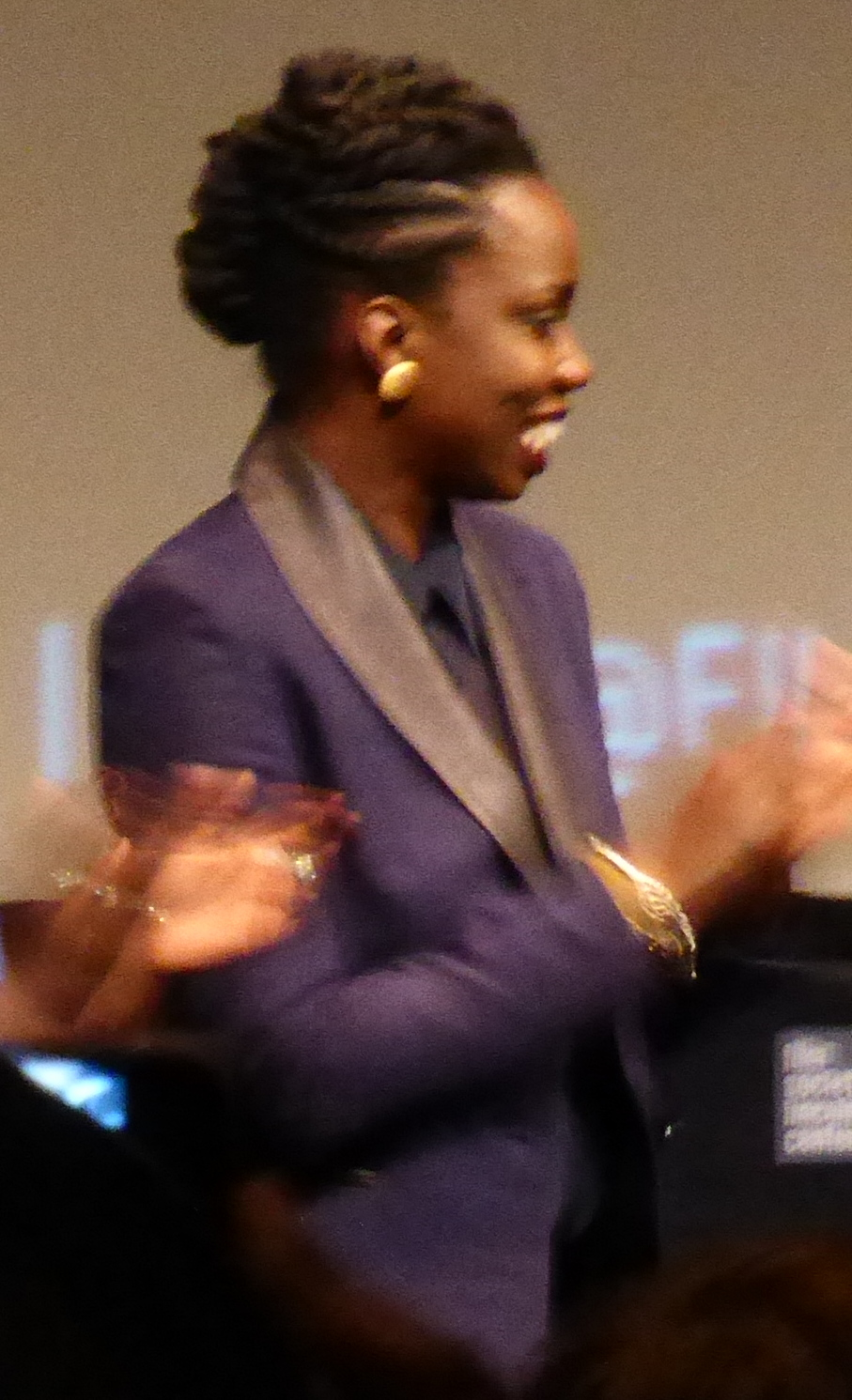
- Oduye at the New York Film Festival, October 8, 2013
- Born: Brooklyn, New York, U.S.
- Education: Cornell University
- Occupations: Actor; director; singer; writer
- Years active: 2002–present

Adepero Oduye (/ˌædəˈpɛroʊ oʊˈduːjeɪ/ AD-ə-PERR-oh oh-DOO-yay) is an American actress, director, singer, and writer. She is known for Pariah (2011), 12 Years a Slave (2013), The Big Short (2015), and Widows (2018).

== Life and career ==
Adepero Oduye was born in Brooklyn, New York, one of seven children of Nigerian parents. Although she graduated pre-med from Cornell University, she decided to pursue her passion for acting upon graduation.

Oduye's breakout role came in 2011 when she starred in Dee Rees' critically acclaimed and award-winning independent film Pariah, for which she received several awards and a nomination for Best Female Lead at the Independent Spirit Awards. During her Golden Globe acceptance speech for The Iron Lady, Meryl Streep mentioned some of her favorite performances of the year, highlighting Oduye in Pariah. The following year, she joined an all-star cast in the Steel Magnolias television remake as Annelle Dupuy-Desoto, a role originated by Daryl Hannah.

In 2013, Oduye co-starred alongside Chiwetel Ejiofor in Steve McQueen's historical drama 12 Years a Slave, winner of the 2014 Academy Award for Best Picture. She also appeared in Ava DuVernay's short film The Door part of Miu Miu's ad campaign known as The Women's Tales. In 2014, she made her directorial debut with Breaking In, a short film about a young black man's first time being stopped and frisked by the NYPD, based on her brother's early experience. The film garnered several film festival acknowledgments and awards.

After several lead roles in regional theater productions, including Eclipsed and The Bluest Eye, Oduye made her Broadway debut opposite Cicely Tyson in Horton Foote's The Trip To Bountiful.

In 2015, Oduye co-starred with Steve Carell in Adam McKay's comedy-drama The Big Short, which won the Academy Award for Best Adapted Screenplay. In 2017, she co-starred in the drama thriller The Dinner, with Richard Gere. In 2018, she appeared in films Geostorm and Widows. In 2019, she played activist Nomsa Brath in the Ava DuVernay's miniseries When They See Us.

== Filmography ==
=== Film ===
Year	Title	Role	Notes
2002	Water	Woman	Short film
2004	Fall		Short film
2004	On the Outs	Adepero	
2006	Thee and a Half Thoughts	Bodega Woman	Short film
2006	Half Nelson	Crack Smoker	
2006	The Tested	Mom	Short film
2007	Pariah	Alike	Short film
2009	Sub Rosa	Ayesha	Short film
2009	If I Leap	Zipporah	Short film
2010	This Is Poetry	Wife	Short film
2010	Tags	Shayla Johns	Short film
2011	Men in Love	Leo's Ex	Short film
2011	Pariah	Alike	Black Reel Award for Best Breakthrough Performance; African-American Film Critics Association Award for Best Breakthrough Performance; Denver Film Festival Rising Star Award; Nominated – Independent Spirit Award for Best Female Lead; Nominated – NAACP Image Award for Best Actress in a Motion Picture; Nominated – Black Reel Award for Best Actress; Nominated – Black Reel Award for Best Ensemble
2013	The Door	L	Short film
2013	12 Years a Slave	Eliza	African-American Film Critics Association Award for Best Ensemble; Nominated — Screen Actors Guild Award for Outstanding Performance by a Cast in a Motion Picture; Nominated — Gold Derby Award for Best Ensemble Cast; Nominated — Seattle Film Critics Society Award for Best Ensemble Cast
2015	My Name Is David	His Date	
2015	Artemis Fall	Commander Aiden Collins	Short film
2015	Outliving Emily	Meg (Segment 5)	
2015	The Big Short	Kathy Tao	Nominated — Gold Derby Award for Best Ensemble Cast
2017	Geostorm	Adisa	
2017	The Dinner	Nina	
2018	Galveston	Loraine	
2018	Wanderland	ANAIS – The Master of the Wind	
2018	Widows	Breechelle	
2018	Viper Club	Keisha	
2020	Tazmanian Devil	Elizabeth Ayodele	
2020	Imitation	Nkem	Short film
2021	Out/Side of Time	Daughter 32	Short film

=== Television ===
Year	Title	Role	Notes
2005	Law & Order	Traci Sands	1 episode
2006	Law & Order: Criminal Intent	Jackie	1 episode
2007	Wifey	Kadijah	Television film
2009	The Unusuals	Regina Plank	1 episode
2010	Louie	Tarese	1 episode
2012	Steel Magnolias	Annelle Dupuy Desoto	Television film NAACP Image Award for Outstanding Actress in a Television Movie, Mini-Series or Dramatic Special; Nominated – Black Reel Award for Best Supporting Actress
2017-2019	The Feels	Ife	5 episodes
2018	Random Acts of Flyness	Aunt Denise	2 episodes
2019	When They See Us	Nomsa Brath	Miniseries, 3 episodes
2020	Monsterland	Amy Cooke	Episode: "Newark, New Jersey"
2021	The Falcon and the Winter Soldier	Sarah Wilson	Miniseries, 5 episodes
2022	Five Days at Memorial	Karen Wynn	Miniseries
2024	Eric	Cecile	Miniseries

== Features ==
- Vanity Fair – Hollywood Issue Cover (2012)
- The New York Times – Great Performances (2012)
- Time – Great Performances (2012)
- W – Best Performances issue (February 2012)
