= Robert "Sonny" Carson =

Civil rights and community activist

- Born: Robert Carson; May 22, 1936; Orangeburg, South Carolina, United States
- Died: December 20, 2002 (aged 66); New York City, New York, United States
- Other names: Sonny Carson, Mwlina Imiri Abubadika, Sonny Abubadika Carson
- Occupation: Political activist
- Known for: The December 12th Movement, The Family Red Apple boycott
- Children: 1

Robert "Sonny" Carson (also known as Mwlina Imiri Abubadika; May 22, 1936 – December 20, 2002) was a civil rights activist, militant black protestor, and community leader in Brooklyn, New York. Carson gained prominence in the 1960s for organizing protests to gain control of African-American public schools in New York City, particularly Ocean Hill–Brownsville. He wrote a popular autobiography, The Education of Sonny Carson (1972), which was made into a 1974 film. He was described in The Village Voice as "Brooklyn’s Malcolm X and Marcus Garvey". Carson is the father of hip-hop artist Professor X.

== Early life ==
Robert Carson Jr. was born on May 22, 1936, in Orangeburg, South Carolina, and moved to Brooklyn as a child as part of the Great Migration. In his youth, Carson joined a street gang called the Bishops. Carson was arrested after robbing a Western Union messenger and was sent to a juvenile-detention center.

Carson fought in the Korean War with the 82nd Airborne Division, where he claimed to have met a Korean soldier who asked him, "Why would a black man fight for a country that would not let you drink from the same water fountain in Mississippi?" Carson credited this question as part of the reason he later became a community activist.

== Early activism and prison ==
Following his return to civilian life, Carson enrolled in college. For some time he continued his involvement in illegal gang activities. However, he then joined the Congress of Racial Equality (CORE), and by 1967 was the executive director of the Brooklyn CORE. He broke from the organization in 1968, stating that it had not done enough to help African Americans.

He took the name Mwlina Imiri Abubadika in the early 1970s to reflect his African consciousness. The name was given to him by Maulena Karenga of US Organization; Mwlina means 'master teacher' and Imiri means 'prince' in the Kiswahili language.

Carson's later founded a group called the Committee to Honor Black Heroes.

=== Kidnapping conviction ===
In 1974, while filming the movie adaption of his autobiography, Carson was arrested on charges of murder, attempted murder, and kidnapping. He was acquitted of the first two charges, but was found guilty of kidnapping in December 1974, and sentenced to seven years in prison. Prosecutors argued he had ordered an attack as revenge for burglarizing a black‐owned hotel in Brooklyn's Bedford‐Stuyvesant section." After the verdict, Carson told reporters, "The only reason we were arrested in the first place is that we were trying to do the job of the New York City police." He was incarcerated for 15 months in the Sing Sing prison.

== Additional activism and views ==
Following his return from prison, Carson returned to activism. In the 1980s he became an advocate against drug use, founding a group called "Black Men's Movement Against Crack". He also organized demonstrations protesting police brutality. He became a central figure in black communities following the 1984 New York City Subway shooting of four black men, racial attacks in Howard Beach, and the Tawana Brawley rape hoax in 1987. He organized a street demonstration after police officers shot and killed a young black man whom they alleged of lunging for an officer's gun, carrying the man's coffin at his funeral.

Carson organized the controversial Family Red Apple boycott (also known as the Flatbush boycott) of Korean-American owned stores in the Flatbush section of Brooklyn in 1990. Carson was investigated by the FBI, under the suspicion that he violated the civil rights of the Korean shopkeepers. He was also involved in the 1991 Crown Heights riot.

=== Allegations of antisemitism ===
Carson has been accused of being antisemitic. In one case he responded, "That's absolutely absurd, 'antisemitic.' And so that you don't ask the question, I'm antiwhite. Don't limit my antis to just one group of people." During the school protests of the 1960s, he was accused of running through schools with other black militant activists to harass white teachers, and reportedly made Holocaust remarks to Jewish teachers.

=== Protest philosophy ===
Carson's tactics typically involved public protest, and he believe in disrupting social order to draw attention to the plight of African-Americans. Several of Carson's protests turned violent. In an interview with The New York Times in 1987, Carson said: "You don't give us any justice, then there ain't going to be no peace. We're going to use whatever means necessary to make sure that everyone is disrupted in their normal life."

=== The Dinkins campaign ===
In 1989, there were media speculations that Carson had accepted payments from the Dinkins mayoral campaign, either for a "get out the vote" drive or a promise to refrain from staging protests during the campaign. In a press conference, Carson denied keeping campaign funds and made his "antiwhite" announcement, in which he blamed white people for kidnapping 20 million black people from Africa.

David Dinkins released a statement apologizing for involving Carson in his campaign, stating: "Sonny Carson's comment represents the kind of bigotry and intolerance I utterly reject and have fought against my whole life. Had such comments come to my attention, he never would have played a role in my campaign."

== Personal life and death ==
As he aged, Carson began to frequently end statements with the word "Peace". In September 2002, Carson suffered two heart attacks and entered a coma. He died in the Manhattan Veterans Affairs Medical Center on December 20, 2002, at the age of 66.
