= Caleel Harris =

American actor (born 2003)

- Born: April 19, 2003 (age 23); California, U.S.
- Occupation: Actor
- Years active: 2010–present

Caleel Harris (born April 19, 2003) is an American actor. He is known for his roles as Musa Rahaim in the Apple TV+ series Swagger and Antron McCray in the Netflix miniseries When They See Us.

He also played AJ in the Nickelodeon animated series Blaze and the Monster Machines (2015–2018). He was Clyde McBride in the Nickelodeon animated series The Loud House (2016–2018). He also played Duke in the films Think Like a Man (2012) and Think Like a Man Too (2014).

== Career ==
He joined Nickelodeon in 2015, and replaced Dusan Brown as the voice of AJ from Blaze and the Monster Machines from late Season 1 up to Season 3, where he was replaced by Ramone Hamilton at the start of Season 4. Later in 2016, he provided the voice of Clyde McBride on The Loud House until early season 3, where Andre Robinson succeeded him in the role due to Harris's puberty. Harris also played Duke in Think Like a Man and its sequel Think Like A Man Too.

== Filmography ==
- 2010: Eyes to See - Haitian Boy
- 2011: Hawthorne - Michael Bourdet
- 2011: Herd Mentality - J.R.
- 2011: The Laurie Berkner Band: Party Day! - Kid
- 2012: Think Like a Man - Duke
- 2013: Jimmy Kimmel Live! - Student
- 2013: Call Me Crazy: A Five Film - Quinn
- 2013: Sam & Cat - Boy #2
- 2013: Sidekick - AJ
- 2014: Men at Work - Young Gibbs
- 2014: Think Like a Man Too - Duke
- 2014: Kirby Buckets - Justin Hansen
- 2015: Boys in Blue - Tanner Bates
- 2015: Nicky, Ricky, Dicky & Dawn - Gilbert
- 2015: How Sarah Got Her Wings - Mason
- 2015–2018: Blaze and the Monster Machines - AJ (voice) ("Runaway Rocket"–Season 3)
- 2016–2018: The Loud House - Clyde McBride, Danny (voice) (Season 1–"Teachers' Union")
- 2016: Peanuts - Franklin (voice)
- 2017: Game Shakers - Young Double G
- 2017: Baker's Man - Young Thomas
- 2017: The Loud House: Deuces Wild - Clyde (voice)
- 2017: Skyward - Curtis
- 2017: NCIS: Los Angeles - Cooper
- 2017: Tree House Time Machine - Vincent
- 2018: Castle Rock - Young Henry Deaver
- 2018: Goosebumps 2: Haunted Halloween - Sam Carter
- 2019: When They See Us - Young Antron McCray
- 2021: Swagger - Musa Rahim
