= Family Red Apple boycott =

1990–1991 boycott in Brooklyn, New York

Coordinates: 40.649849°N 73.962477°W

Location of Family Red Apple on a map of New York City.

The Family Red Apple boycott, also known as the "Red Apple boycott", "Church Avenue boycott" or "Flatbush boycott", was the starting point of an eighteen-month series of boycotts targeting Korean-owned stores. It began in January 1990 with a Korean-American-owned shop called Family Red Apple at 1823 Church Avenue in the Flatbush section of Brooklyn and extended to other stores, both within and beyond the original neighborhood.

The boycott coincided with the economic downturn and recession that had exacerbated poverty, crime and drug use in underprivileged New York neighborhoods during the first half of the 1990s. The racially motivated boycott presaged the Crown Heights riot the following year, which further compromised relations between Jewish-American and African-American communities in the borough, and diminished support for mayor David Dinkins' tenure in the city.

During the latter half of the 1990s, as crime and unemployment rates plummeted in the city, community relations declined between Korean business owners and black protesters, some of whom had been radicalized by the racialist rhetoric espoused by black nationalists (such as Robert (Sonny) Carson). Simultaneously, Asian and Jewish community relations generally improved. As early as 1991, the Family Red Apple boycott ended amicably, with a "steady stream of customers" frequenting the Korean-owned grocery store after the previous owner relinquished his lease.

== Events ==
=== Initial events ===
The boycott was sparked by an alleged assault of a Haitian American woman, Giselaine Fetissainte, by a Korean-American shopkeeper. The woman alleged that she had been searched and then struck by three of the shop's employees. The shopkeeper said that the woman had refused to pay for store items and that she had not been attacked. The boycott was led by Robert (Sonny) Carson, a local activist and black nationalist, and George Edward Tait, a community activist and educator. The incident led to public criticism of New York City's Mayor David Dinkins for failing to end the protest.

=== Threatened escalation ===
Carson threatened the storeowners that the boycott would escalate, stating "in the future, there will be funerals not boycotts". Police discovered 18 Molotov cocktails on nearby rooftops. In one instance the boycott turned violent, when a black protester attacked a Vietnamese man with a claw hammer while other black protesters shouted "Koreans go home". Race relations were less dire than people feared, but at the time the prospect of racial unraveling seemed real.

A New York City judge, Gerald S. Held, issued an order barring the demonstrators from picketing within 50 feet (15 metres) of the Korean stores. However, the NYPD refrained from enforcing the order, saying it involved a civil dispute. The mayor's office attempted to mediate between the two sides. Eight months into the boycott, with the picketers continuing to refuse to cooperate, Dinkins made a personal effort at reconciliation by shopping at the grocery shop. Dinkins's effort was received well by the Korean storeowner but was met with curses from the black picketers. Dinkins's symbolic gesture did not end the boycott.

=== Related events ===
Family Red Apple was not the only store affected. Seven months after the first boycott, another one began in Brownsville, another Brooklyn neighborhood.

This boycott elicited a stronger response by the Dinkins administration.

== Resolution ==
The boycott ended after the owner of Family Red Apple sold out his lease to another Korean-American. The store reopened three days later and had a steady stream of customers.

== Criticism of Mayor Dinkins ==
Mayor Dinkins was criticized in the press for his administration's handling of the affair. The situation was described as "not just one boycott but a gratuitous strike against a Korean-owned grocery across the street." It was also noted that "leaflets exhorted blacks to boycott all Korean stores and avoid shopping with people who do not look like us." Finger-pointing was also reported. The mayor blamed the Brooklyn District Attorney, and a Deputy Mayor said that boycotts by aggrieved customers are appropriate only as a last resort, not the first, and never against whole groups of people.

=== The Mayor's reflection ===
In his memoir, Mayor Dinkins wrote, "I was criticized for not crossing the picket line and ending the boycott by example. I was prepared to mediate the dispute, but I suspected my presence would not have helped at that juncture....In this instance I believed that my participation would do more harm than good." He also wrote, "It may well be that I waited an overly long time to take this step, but I had faith in the court system and in the rational ability of people to come to satisfactory conclusions among themselves. I may have been wrong on both counts."

=== Reaction of the New York Times ===
This type of "antagonism ... led to boycotts of a half-dozen Korean stores ... since 1984." Seven months after the January 1990 start of the Family Red Apple matter in Flatbush, The New York Times wrote regarding August's Brownsville case, "At least the Mayor acted quickly this time, and acknowledges the likelihood of a racial motive.

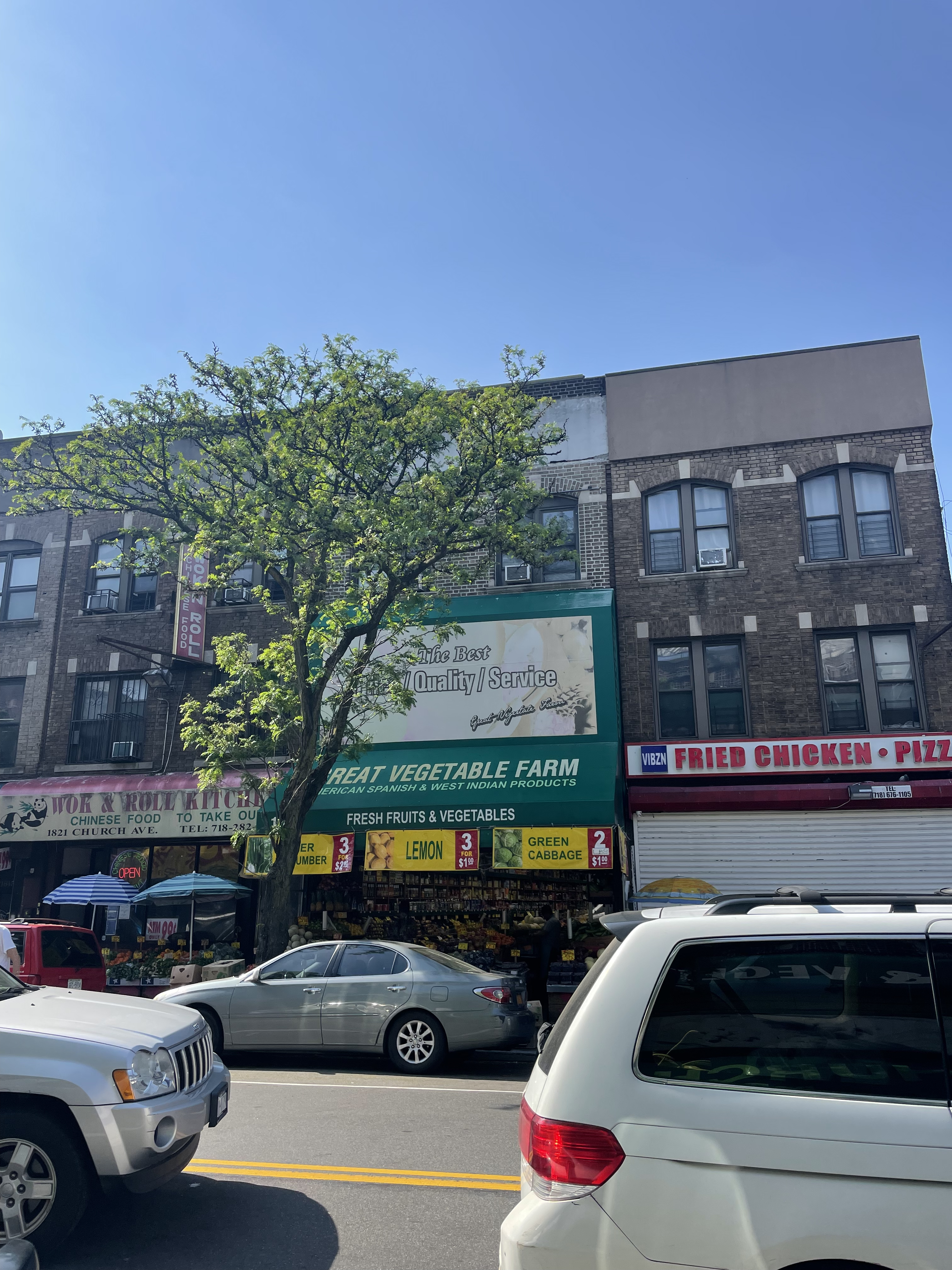
1823 Church Ave, Brooklyn, NY 11226 in the year 2022
