= Kwame Brathwaite =

American visual artist and photographer (1938–2023)

- Born: Gilbert Ronald Brathwaite; January 1, 1938; Brooklyn, NY, U.S.
- Died: April 1, 2023 (aged 85); New York City, U.S.
- Occupations: Photojournalist, activist
- Years active: 1950s–2023
- Known for: Documentary photojournalism
- Relatives: Elombe Brath (brother) John Edward Brathwaite (brother) Ndola Qondile Brathwaite Carlest (daughter) Kwame Samori Brathwaite (son)
- Website: kwamebrathwaite.com

Kwame Brathwaite (January 1, 1938 – April 1, 2023) was an American photojournalist and activist known for popularizing the phrase "Black is Beautiful" and documenting life and culture in Harlem and Africa.

== Life and work ==
He was born Gilbert Ronald Brathwaite in Brooklyn on January 1, 1938. His parents Cecil and Margaret (Maloney) Brathwaite were immigrants from Barbados. Brought up in the South Bronx, he excelled in his studies as a boy, and in the early 1950s, was enrolled at the School of Industrial Art (now the High School of Art and Design). His work chronicled the cultural, political, and social developments of Harlem, Africa, and the African diaspora. He adopted the name Kwame in the early 1960s, a tribute to Kwame Nkrumah, the first leader of post-colonial Ghana.

With his older brother Elombe Brath, Brathwaite founded the African Jazz Art Society and Studios in 1956 and Grandassa Models in 1962.

In 2021, the Pérez Art Museum Miami acquired "Untitled (AJASS Model on Black Background)" (1970s/2019)," portraying a female model figure dressed in patterns resembling quilts created in African-American communities, such as those made at Gee's Bend, in Alabama. The artist is a major figure in the Black is Beautiful movement.

Brathwaite died in Manhattan on April 1, 2023, at the age of 85. He was survived by his wife Sikolo (whom he married c. 1966), his son Kwame Samori Brathwaite (known as Kwame Jr., born c. 1974), and his daughter Ndola Carlest.

=== Naturally pageants ===
On January 28, 1962, with his brother Elombe Brath, Brathwaite staged the Naturally '62 pageant, the first of a series of pageants to feature only black models. The 1962 pageant was titled The Original African Coiffure and Fashion Extravaganza Designed to Restore Our Racial Pride & Standards. Held at the Harlem Purple Manor, a nightclub on East 125th Street, it helped to popularize the phrase "Black Is Beautiful" that was printed on the pageant's poster. The Naturally pageants ran for five years, with the last one held in 1966.

In the 1960s, his work also appeared in New York Amsterdam News, The City Sun, and The Daily Challenge. He photographed Stevie Wonder, Bob Marley, James Brown in concert, and Muhammad Ali.

In 2017, Brathwaite was honored at the 75th Aperture Gala.

Yemi Bamiro's documentary Black Is Beautiful: The Kwame Brathwaite Story on Brathwaite's life and work was shown as part of the Official Competition of the BFI London Film Festival in 2025.

Brathwaite's work was included in the 2025 exhibition Photography and the Black Arts Movement, 1955–1985 at the National Gallery of Art.

== Exhibitions ==
- Black Is Beautiful: The Photography of Kwame Brathwaite, organized by Aperture Foundation (2019)
- Icons of Style: A Century of Fashion Photography, Museum of Fine Arts, Houston (2019)
- Tools of Revolution: Fashion Photography and Activism, Houston Center for Photography (2020)
- The Struggle Continues, Victory is Certain, Philip Martin Gallery (2020)
- Facing Forward: Photographic Portraits from the Collection, Santa Barbara Museum of Art (2021)
- Changing Times, Philip Martin Gallery (2021)
- Black Is Beautiful: The Photography of Kwame Brathwaite, Detroit Institute of Arts (2021-2022)
- My Village/New York, Philip Martin Gallery (2022)
- Things Well Worth Waiting For, Art Institute of Chicago (2023)
- Kwame Brathwaite: The 1970s, Arkansas Museum of Fine Arts (2025)
- Black is Beautiful, Mougins Center of Photography, France (2025)
- Black is Beautiful, Centre d'Art Gwinzegal, France (2026)
- Black is Beautiful, Maison de la photographie Robert Doisneau, France (2026)
