= Black is beautiful =

Cultural movement started in the 1960s by African Americans

Black is beautiful is a cultural movement that was started in the United States in the 1960s by African Americans. It later spread beyond the United States, most prominently in the writings of the Black Consciousness Movement of Steve Biko in South Africa. Black is beautiful got its roots from the Négritude movement of the 1930s. Negritude argued for the importance of a Pan-African racial identity among people of African descent worldwide.

The movement aims to dispel the racist notion that Black people's natural features, such as skin color, facial features, and hair, are inherently ugly. The movement also encouraged men and women to stop trying to eliminate African-identified traits by attempting to lighten or bleach their skin. John Rock was long thought to be the first person to coin the phrase "Black is beautiful"—during a speech in 1858—but historical records indicate that he never actually used the specific phrase on that day. Bill Allen, a freelance writer for advertising agencies, claimed he coined the phrase in the 1950s.

The phrase “Black is beautiful” is meant to uplift the emotional and psychological well-being of Black people. It promotes the Black culture and identity, where the Black past is seen as an inspirational source of cultural pride. It affirms the beauty of Black people's natural features, such as their variety of skin colors, hair styles and textures, as well as physical characteristics.

This movement began in an effort to counteract the racist notion in American culture that features typical of Black people were less attractive or desirable than those of White people. Research indicates that the idea of Blackness being ugly is highly damaging to the psyche of African Americans, manifesting itself as internalized racism. This idea made its way into Black communities themselves and led to practices such as paper bag parties: social events which discriminated against dark-skinned African Americans by only admitting lighter-skinned individuals.

== History ==
While the Black Is Beautiful movement started in the 1960s, the fight for equal rights and a positive perception of the African-American body started much earlier in American history. This movement took form because the media and society as a whole had a negative perception of the African-American body as being only suitable for slave status. The Black Is Beautiful movement was based around a fight for an equal perception of the Black body to help undo all the negative ideas brought about by a history based in white supremacy.

== Literature ==
The Black is Beauty movement, which emerged during the 1960s and 1970s, had a profound impact on Black literature by challenging and redefining prevailing standards of beauty, identity, and representation. There were a great number of ways the movement impacted Black literature such as:

1. Reclaiming Black aesthetics. The Black is Beauty movement sought to challenge Eurocentric beauty standards that had marginalized and denigrated Black features and aesthetics. This movement encouraged Black writers to embrace and celebrate their African heritage, including physical features, hairstyles, and cultural expressions.
2. Empowering Black identity: The movement emphasized the importance of embracing and affirming Black identity. Black writers responded by exploring themes of self-acceptance, self-love, and cultural pride in their works. One prominent example is Toni Morrison's novel The Bluest Eye (1970), which delves into the damaging effects of colorism and societal beauty standards on a young Black girl named Pecola. Through Pecola's story, Morrison challenges the notion of beauty as solely defined by white standards, highlighting the importance of self-acceptance.
3. Centering Black women: The Black is Beauty movement placed a strong emphasis on the beauty and strength of Black women. It celebrated their unique features, promoted self-confidence, and addressed the specific struggles they faced such as conforming to a certain beauty standard and being harassed and humiliated for their own natural features.

Black literature had reached a turning point at this time and many of the writers of this era were releasing works that were themed with Black Beauty. For example, in Maya Angelou's iconic autobiography "I Know Why the Caged Bird Sings" (1969), she explores her journey of self-discovery and acceptance of her own physical appearance, reclaiming her Blackness as beautiful. In her collection of essays titled "Sister Outsider" (1984), Audre Lorde discusses the intersections of race, gender, and identity. Her works empower Black women by highlighting their resilience, beauty, and the importance of self-expression. In "For Colored Girls Who Have Considered Suicide/When the Rainbow Is Enuf" by Ntozake Shange (1975), this groundbreaking choreopoem combines poetry, music, and dance to depict the lives of Black women. It celebrates their beauty, resilience, and unique experiences while addressing the challenges they face in a society that often devalues their beauty and worth.

Publications like the Negro Digest supported the Black cultural revolution and urged readers to connect with their African heritage and learn traditional African languages.

In 1969, Elizabeth Catlett published Negro Es Bello II. The title translates from Spanish into “Black is beautiful.” The black panthers and Black face on the cover represent Black pride and power.

These examples represent a fraction of the works influenced by the Black is Beautiful movement in Black literature. The movement challenged beauty standards, empowered Black identity, countered narratives of inferiority, centered Black women, cultivated Black consciousness, and expanded the literary canon to create a more diverse and inclusive representation of Black experiences.

== Fashion ==
On January 28, 1962, a fashion show staged by photojournalist Kwame Brathwaite titled, "Naturally ‘62: The Original African Coiffure and Fashion Extravaganza Designed to Restore Our Racial Pride & Standards," held in the basement of the Harlem Purple Manor would prove to be the kickstart to the Black is Beautiful movement. The main attractions of the pageant were the Grandassa Models, who were a group of local activists turned models within Harlem made up of Clara Lewis, Black Rose, Helene Nomsa Brath, Priscilla Bardonille, Mari Toussaint, Esther Davenport, Wanda Sims, Beatrice Cramston, and Jean Gumbs. The women came out clad in clothes and jewelry inspired by their African heritage, while showcasing their natural hair and skin. At the time, this was considered extremely taboo, as Black women were not ever put in the forefront of mainstream fashion. Even in Black magazines such as Ebony, models were expected to be light-skin and wear designs and brands created by white people. The theme of the fashion show, self-pride, helped to propel the show to something much bigger than what it originally was, putting on multiple shows all around America. The showcase of the African-inspired attire and jewelry was a message to the Black community to take pride in where they came from. The Grandassa Models, along with Kwame and his brother, Elombe Brathe, essentially helped to popularize the term “Black is Beautiful” following the major success of their creation and caused it to evolve from a fashion show into a mainstream movement to honor Afro-centric culture and features.

=== African prints ===
Following the Civil Rights Movement, African Americans wore Kente cloth and Dashiki to represent Black politics, Black power and pride in African heritage. In the early 1970s, kente and dashiki clothing grew popular in the United States.

Black community and movement leaders, like Stokely Carmichael and Kathleen Cleaver wore African prints.

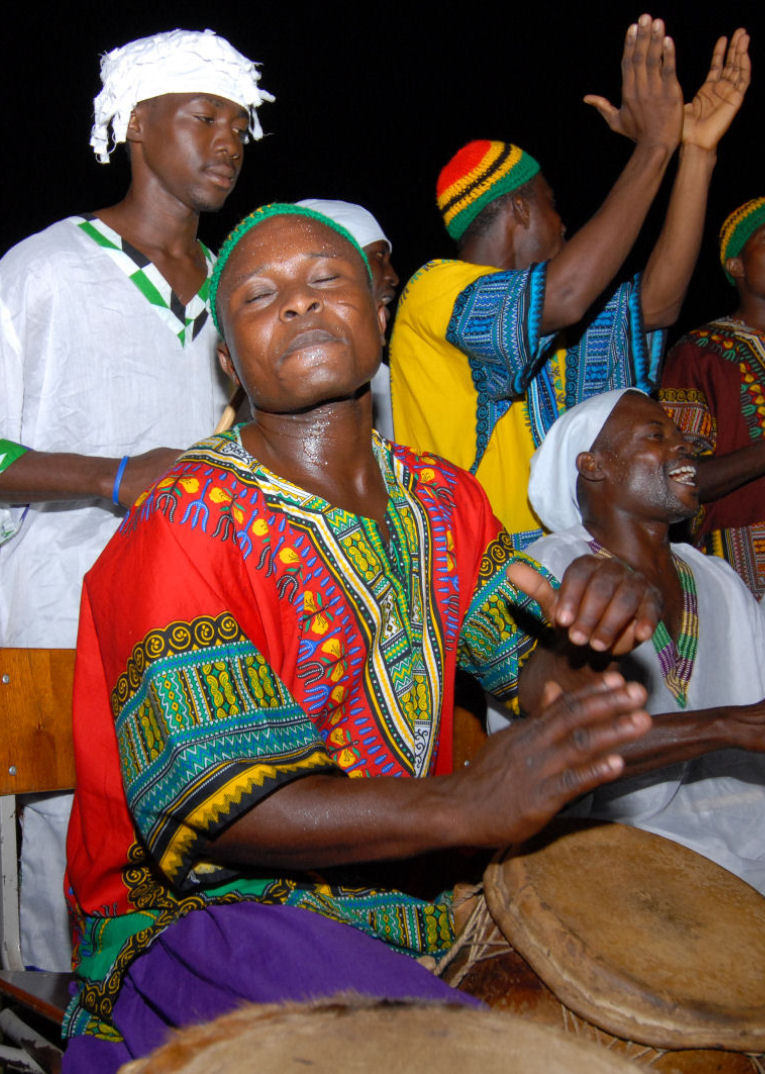
Drummers wearing Dashiki

=== Impact and legacy ===
The pageant was a huge success and its legacy can be seen everywhere to this day. It made African-Americans more confident in their natural and cultural looks and made it common practice to dress in Afro-inspired clothing and jewelry. The dashiki was worn by civil rights activists like Malcolm X and used to exemplify the phrase Black is Beautiful. It made it more possible for darkskin models to pave a way for themselves in the industry. It also proved to have a massive impact amongst pop culture and fashion icons. Supermodels Bethann Hardison and Iman (model) set out to continue what Kwame Brathwaite started and created the Black Girls Coalition in 1988, an advocacy group for Black models to find work. Business mogul and megastar Rihanna cited Kwame's photos of the Grandassa Models as the inspiration for her initial Fenty collection, which released in 2019, stating "When I was coming up with the concept for this release, we were just digging and digging and we came up with these images – they made me feel they were relevant to what we are doing right now..."

== Hair and beauty ==
The movement focused on natural hairstyles such as the “Afro”. Different natural hair textures, skin tones, and afrocentric physical features were appreciated and encouraged. Natural Hairstyles represented pride in African heritage and political/cultural allegiance to the coinciding Black Power movement. African Americans wore their hair with grooming tools such as the Afro pick. Some picks were molded with a raised black fist at the top.

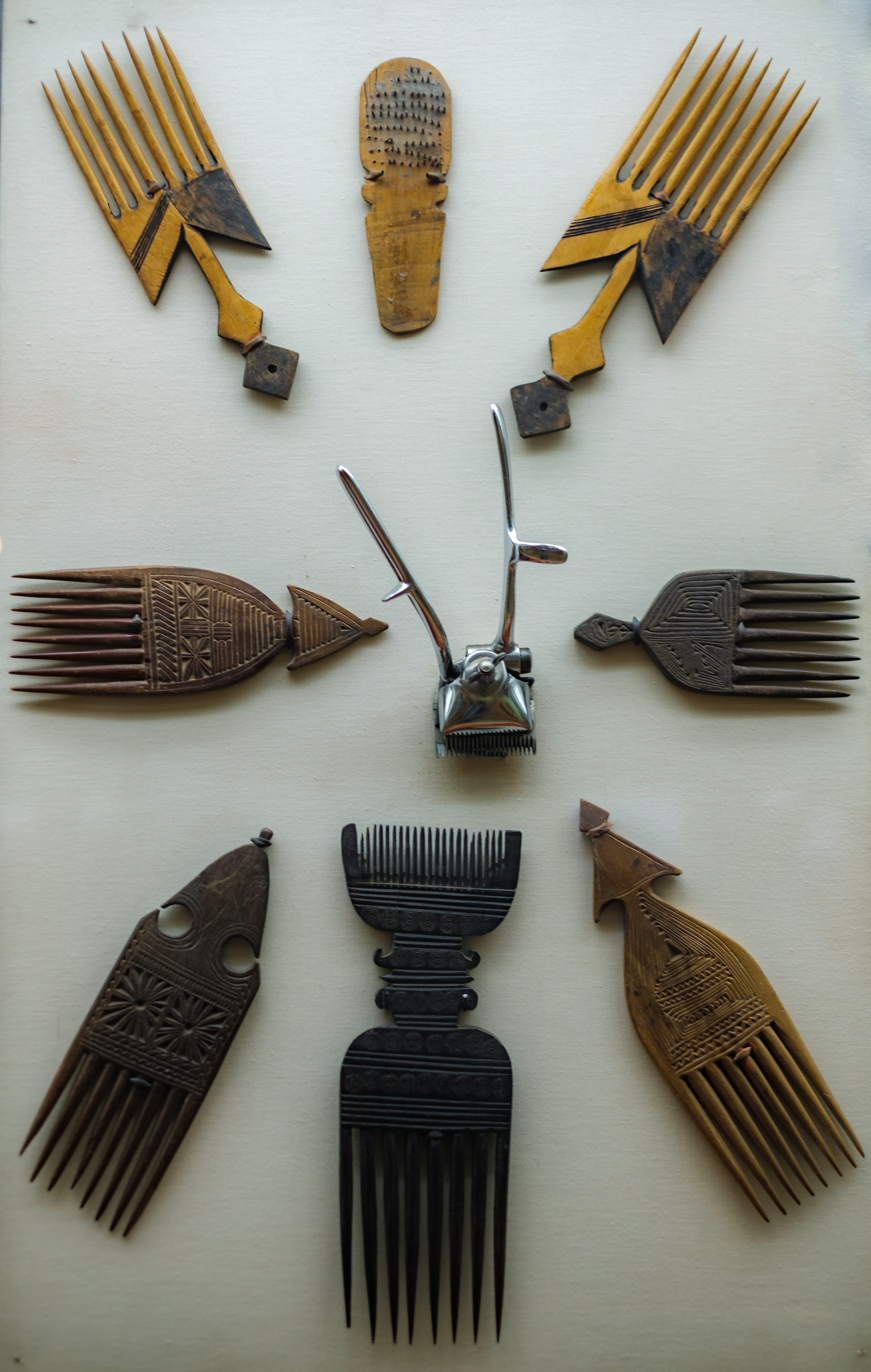
African hair comb picks

=== Prior ===
During the 1950s and early 1960s, hair straightening was seen as good grooming. Natural, kinky, curly styles were not worn very often (in their natural state). Prior to the 1960s African American beauty standards consisted of long hair and lighter skin. Different skin tones and hair textures were not celebrated as beautiful in mainstream. Previously hair straightening, skin lightening, and bleaching were marketed. That marketing and production did not stop but by the time the movement came, those practices were options instead of necessities.

=== Advertising ===
Caroline R. Jones, one of the first female African American advertising figures at the company, J. Walter Thompson, was in charge of creating a hypothetical Black female cosmetics campaign. More brands began to widen the lipstick, powder, foundation, and blush shades in order to cater to darker skin tones. In 1969, it was reported that over half a dozen new cosmetics lines for Black women had emerged in the last five years.

Brands sold their products with pro-Black advertising. TCB Naturals, a hair care line with “Let beauty go to your head… Everything is beautiful.” Pond's 1979 cold cream tagline was "I wear my face proudly.” Zuri, a makeup brand had “For the women of color” and “Beauty comes in many colors.” These advertisements featured Black women and appealed to the Black female consumers. Advertisements for products enhancing and celebrating natural hairstyles and afros featured Black men, women, children, families, and couples. Brands such as Luster's S Curl, Carefree Curl, Classy Curls had featured advertisements. The Johnson Products company was a Black-owned company that launched the infamous Afro Sheen line of shampoos, conditioners, and sprays, with hair straightening products as well. James Brown ditched his conk, a popular straightened hairstyle worn by African American men, for an afro after releasing “Say It Loud - I’m Black And I’m Proud!” Marcus Garvey, a political activist once said “Don’t remove the kinks from your hair! Remove them from your brains!”

=== Results ===
According to a 1960s Newsweek poll, nearly 70% of northern Black people and 40% of southern Black people under thirty approved of afros. Activist Angela Davis styled her hair in an afro during the Black Power movement that followed. Davis wore it as a sign of Black power and rebellion against white beauty standards. Kathleen Cleaver, an activist and former spouse to the early leader of the Black Panther Party, also wore her hair in an afro.

Willie Lee Morrow, a hair care products businessman, invented the Afro pick in the 1960s, originally calling it the Afro Tease. Hairdresser Lois Liberty Jones and journalist John Henry Jones published All About Natural in 1971. The book showed a variety of different afro styles. The book took a stance against hair straightening and endorsed Clairol hair products. The book also discussed the history of African American hair.

Musicians of the time such as Diana Ross and Jimi Hendrix were well known for their afros. Natural hairstyles like the afro were deemed as unprofessional. The larger afros, mostly worn by women, were considered the more feminine afro compared to men's afros because they took more effort in maintaining.

=== Impact ===
In 1971, the Philadelphia Commission on Human Rights received complaints from Black women that got fired or sent home for the wearing their natural afro at work. A hair discrimination case in 1976, Jenkins v. Blue Cross Mutual Hospital Insurance, was held in favor of Jenkins. The U.S. Court of Appeals for the Seventh Circuit ruled against the employer for bias against afros. This was ruled under Title VII of the Civil Rights Act.

== Controversy ==
=== Sexualization/fetishization ===
The oppression of Black people with beauty extended far beyond skin color. Sexuality and body components were a huge fascination for owners and colonizers who sought to purchase slaves from other owners. One of the more prominent figures, Sara Baartman, was an enslaved worker who was fetishized by many for her enormous buttocks, causing her to become a source of attraction. In 1810, Baartman was subjected to a contract that would allow her to travel to various places to perform for other audiences. She was said to be illiterate, which prevented her from understanding the contract, but nevertheless agreed. Her body and buttocks were highly exhibited to wealthy people, with others being allowed to grope or touch her. A drawing of her titled “A Pair of Broad Bottoms”, was created to recognize her larger exterior in the presence of the wealthy, bigger rich men. Nicknamed the “Hottentot Venus”, she was widely recognized and sought out by viewers for her shows, which saw her dancing and playing various instruments to garner attention for herself. Her celebrity would die out due to familiarity in different places with different ethnicities. She would become celebrated again due to her appearances at large parties. She died at the age of 26 years old. Before her death, she agreed to a painting of herself that would be replicated for many times afterwards. This picture remains an iconic photo that resembles the many phallocentric shapings of Black women, heavily depicted throughout the history of music, television, and now into mainstream media as it continues to grow.

Fetishization was shared along both genders, with men having experienced the negative effects of their skin tone in degrading stereotypes. Black men have been subject of interest as well, falling into the male gaze due to expectations regarding size and body. Dating back to the early 20th century, years before the Civil Rights movement and age of hip-hop, young, and older Black men were sought after as savages and brutes, consumed by ill-minded behaviors that threatened white supremacist and white maidens (3). As a result, the “White Women’s Protection Ordinance” was a new rule enacted deliberately to punish Black people for the attempted rape of a European women. Artist Robert Mapplethorpe was often chastised for the portrayal of the Black body in obscene gestures and images visualized to the public. The criminalization of Black people for interracial relationship had become another sought after technique to undermine Black individuals and their self-esteem in procreating with those outside their ethnicities. Emmett Till was a focal point of drawback for these chains of events, due to his untimely death by the hands of white masters for allegedly eyeing and making remarks towards a white woman.

=== Colorism ===
The Black is Beautiful movement has had to overcome many obstacles to get to the point it is at today. One of the many discriminatory practices and/or mindsets that the movement tries to dispel is the ideology of colorism. Colorism got its roots in slavery; It was used as a tool to create separation between fairer skinned Europeans and darker skin enslaved Africans. This method of discrimination would prove to be very successful in its attempt to engrave itself into the world consciousness. Colorism would end up taking heavy influence in Black communities due to its hierarchical system in which lighter-skinned Black people would be considered closer in proximity to white thus giving them more power in society. With the strive to be white ever growing in the world Black people would find ways to change themselves so they could assimilate into white society. One of which would be a learned attraction to lighter skinned individuals.

Contrary to popular belief, individuals' attraction to one another is not entirely based on one's preferences. Society has a large part in how we see one another; so when it comes to finding a partner these societal pressures take influence. Negative stereotypes would consider darker skinned people as barbaric or animalistic thus making them unattractive. Due to the fact that whiteness was the goal for many Black people when finding a partner they would look for someone who could provide them with lighter skinned kids. Not only did the societal pressures affect the way people looked at each other, it also affected how people saw themselves. Black people all over the world were learning to hate themselves for things they cannot and should not have to control. This self-hatred would cause many darker skinned people to use damaging chemicals like to whiten their skin. These practices were toxic to not only their skin but to their minds as well. Despite skin bleaching seeming dramatic, it was just one of many ways Black people would try to cope with their existence within a white supremacist society.

The Black is Beautiful movement sought to challenge colorist narratives by promoting the beauty of all shades of Blackness. The movement encouraged Black individuals to embrace their own unique beauty and identity, rather than striving to fit into a narrow definition of beauty that was based on white standards. This included embracing natural hair textures, styles, and colors, as well as celebrating diverse skin tones and features. The movement also recognized the importance of self-love and self-acceptance in combating the harmful effects of colorism. By promoting messages of self-love and self-acceptance, the movement sought to counteract the self-hatred that had been ingrained in Black communities for years. Today, the Black is Beautiful movement continues to inspire and empower individuals to embrace their own unique beauty and identity. Through social media and other online platforms, individuals are able to share their stories and experiences, and to celebrate the diversity and richness of Black culture. By rejecting harmful societal hierarchies based on skin color, the movement is helping to build a more inclusive and equitable society for all.

The exploitation of Baartman and others took interest in the Black community, opening the discussion to challenge beauty standards among races and cultures alike. With new mainstream events like twerking arising, originating from West African dances known as mapouka, it has been a controversial debate within the community regarding its use and how often Black people are objectified for the dance move. The discussion of stereotypes regarding Black woman as promiscuous and voyeuristic have paved the way for progressive movements that take pride in Black beauty, regarding the Black is beautiful movement. Its nature continues to shape the discussion and made formed today in defending Black people and their body.

To combat the colorism in Black magazines like Ebony, Kwame Brathwaite used techniques to enhance and deepen how Black skin would look on camera. His models were of different skintones. He said, “There was lots of controversy because we were protesting how, in Ebony magazine, you couldn’t find an ebony girl.”

=== Misrepresentation ===
Naturally '62, a fashion show designated in New York, featured Black women that rebelled against Western beauty standards by wearing their natural hair out in the wake of a new outcry for Black representation. Ebony and other fashion magazines had shown a low tolerance for featuring darker-skinned tones, an issue that the community sought to protest by promoting afro hairstyles, along with natural bodies that did not objectify Black women in comparison to Western women. During this time, the beauty standard catered to European ideals that valued lighter skin and straightened hair, which sold more towards white audiences than others.

== See also ==
- African-American beauty
- African-American culture
- Afro
- Black nationalism
- Black pride
- Cornrows
- Dreadlocks
- Natural hair movement
- Negro É Lindo
- Racial transformation
