= Elombe Brath =

Pan-African activist

Cecil Elombe Brath
- Born: Cecil Elombe Brathwaite; September 30, 1936; New York City, US
- Died: May 19, 2014 (aged 77); New York City, US
- Occupation: Pan-African activist
- Spouse: Helene Nomsa Brath
- Children: 6
- Relatives: Kwame Brathwaite (brother)

Cecil Elombe Brath (September 30, 1936 – May 19, 2014) was a Pan-African activist, born in New York City of Barbadian heritage, who is best known for founding the Patrice Lumumba Coalition. He was an influential activist, recognized by Stokely Carmichael as the "Dean of Harlem Nationalists" and by Dudley Thompson, an "Icon of the Pan-African Movement".

== Biography ==
He was born in Brooklyn, New York, where his father had migrated from Barbados in the 1920s. Brath grew up in Harlem and Hunts Point, and attended the High School of Industrial Art (now Art and Design), later winning a college scholarship to the School of Visual Arts.

In 1956, he was among the co-founders of the African Jazz-Art Society & Studios "to reclaim jazz as music of contemporary African traditions that should be controlled by black artists", and in 1962, he began working as a graphic artist for ABC Television, remaining there until his retirement in 1999.

Brath fought to eliminate the usage of the term "negro" and, in 1961, launched a "Black is Beautiful" campaign with a series of Afrocentric fashion shows featuring African-American women who were known as the Grandassa Models and sported large afros.

In 1975 Brath founded, with Irving Davis, the Patrice Lumumba Coalition, which supported the right to self-determination for Angolans, South Africans, and Namibians and other African liberation movements. In 1976, the Coalition released a policy memo calling for the support of the Zimbabwe Liberation Army. They garnered attention for a 1977 boycott of Ipi Tombi, a Broadway musical that purportedly misrepresented life under apartheid.

Brath was the host of the New York City radio show Afrikaleidoscope on WBAI, and often organized events and panels in the city to bring attention to African politics and current events.

In 2003, Brath cofounded the World African Diaspora Union (WADU) to advocate for the unification of the African Diaspora politically, culturally, and economically with Africa. WADU was officially launched in 2004.

The great thinkers whom Brath counted as influences — Marcus Garvey, Malcolm X, Carlos A. Cooks, and his cousin Clennell Wickham — waged a political battle on behalf of working-class blacks in colonial Barbados.

Brath died in Harlem at the age of 77.

== Legacy ==
In 2017, Elombe Brath Way in Harlem was named in his honor.
