= Asbestos Hazard Emergency Response Act =

US law

The Asbestos Hazard Emergency Response Act (AHERA) is a US federal law enacted in 1986 by the 99th United States Congress and signed into law by President Ronald Reagan. It required the EPA to create regulations regarding local education agencies' management of asbestos in school buildings, including inspection of asbestos-containing building materials, preparing asbestos management plans, and performing asbestos response actions to prevent or reduce asbestos hazards. AHERA was implemented under Title II of the Toxic Substance Control Act of 1976. In addition to actions required by the local education agencies (LEA), AHERA demanded the EPA develop an accreditation program for persons conducting asbestos inspection and corrective-action activities at schools.

== Purpose ==
The Asbestos Hazard Emergency Response Act (AHERA) was signed into law to create an enforceable set of legal requirements for managing asbestos containing building materials (ACBM) in public and private non-profit school buildings. With the latency periods of the most common asbestos-related diseases being between 20 and 40 years, the need to manage childhood exposure to asbestos was something that needed clear and consistent guidance. Asbestos management was addressed in part by the Clean Air Act (CAA) and National Emission Standards for Hazardous Air Pollutants (NESHAP), specifically relating to airborne fibers. Neither of these regulations provided guidance on how to manage asbestos day-to-day in a building.

== Requirements ==
Initial Implementation

With the passage of AHERA in October 1986, publication in the Federal Register in May of 1987 and final rule issuance in October 1987, a countdown began for initial implementation in all non-profit schools. All buildings managed by LEAs (including those used for administrative purposes) were required to have an asbestos management plan developed and issued to their state by October 12, 1988. There was an opportunity for the state to require changes to the initial draft, then plan implementation was required no later than July 9, 1989.

All buildings must have an initial inspection by an accredited inspector to identify the location of any friable (easily ground to dust with hand pressure) and non-friable asbestos containing materials (ACM) before developing a management plan.

Based on the findings from the initial inspection, response actions must be determined for each ACBM that best protects human and environmental health, while placing the least amount of burden on the LEA. The possible response actions are removal, repair, encapsulation and enclosure. The type of material and the amount of damage will determine the appropriate response action and must be designed and implemented by appropriately accredited individuals.

Elements of a Compliant School Asbestos Management Plan

- Developed by an accredited asbestos management planner
- Details of all asbestos containing materials identified within a building, including their condition, and response actions
- Proof that accredited individuals performed the inspection, developed the management plan and determined response actions
- Plan for re-inspections
- Plan for conducting operations and maintenance around existing ACM.

Ongoing Monitoring of Asbestos Containing Materials Left in Place

After the initial inspection, LEAs are required to perform periodic surveillance of all remaining ACM. Periodic surveillance includes visual inspection to determine if the condition of a material has changed. This work can be performed by a non-accredited individual, such as a school staff member.

LEAs are also required to have a re-inspection of all ACM performed by an accredited inspector every three years.

If new or worsening damage is noted in either the periodic surveillance or re-inspection, it may require working with a management planner to determine new appropriate response actions for that material and an update to the management plan.

Additional LEA Responsibilities

- Designate a single contact person, responsible for overseeing the requirements and implementation of AHERA
- Make the Management Plan available for inspection by parents, teachers, and other school employees
- Provide annual notification to parents, teachers, and other school employees about the location and availability of the management plan and details of any asbestos-related activity within the building
- Provide all maintenance and facilities staff with asbestos awareness training annually

== Additional Information ==
Whistleblowers are protected from retribution by the act.
