= Carlos A. Cooks =

Dominican Republic-born Black nationalist activist

Carlos A. Cooks (1913-1966) was a politician from Dominican Republic.

== Overview ==
Cooks was born in San Pedro de Macoris Dominican Republic on June 23, 1913, to James Henry Cooks and Alice Cooks, who were originally from the island of St. Martin. His education took place mostly in Santo Domingo until moving to New York in 1929 where he went on to higher learning. Cooks was known for his love of sports and his expertise in boxing. His intellect was recognized from an early age and he attended the leadership school in the Voodoo Sacré Society. Cooks' involvement in the UNIA comes as no surprise as both his uncle and father were among the many St. Martiners who were members of the Marcus Garvey-led organization.

Cooks coined the phrase "buy Black" many years before it was popularized by others, The Amsterdam News reported.

Cooks died in Harlem, New York, on May 5, 1966, aged 52, although the age was initially misreported as 53.

== Cooks and Garvey ==
Marcus Garvey was an influence on Cooks. Cooks argued that all Garvey's actions were devoted towards the upliftment and improvement of the status of Black People in the United States of America.

== The African Nationalist Pioneer Movement ==
Born out of Garvey's Universal Negro Improvement Association and African Communities League, the African Nationalist Pioneer Movement was started by Cooks on June 23, 1941. He envisioned that movement as "an educational, inspirational, instructive, constructive and expansive society... composed of people desirous of bringing about a progressive, dignified, cultural, fraternal and racial confraternity among the African peoples of the world."

== Lectures and works ==
Some of his works include:

1. Why Black nationalism
2. Fundamentalism: A Call to Action
3. The Nationalist Manifesto
4. Racial Integration—A Sociological Farce
5. The Tragic Consequences of White Psychology
6. American Tradition Vetoes Integration
7. Strange, Isn't It?
8. Harlem—Citadel of the Caste
9. Marcus Garvey Champion of African Redemption
10. Lumumba foils Colonialist Plot to Partition the Congo
11. Kwame Nkrumah of Ghana
12. Jomo Kenyatta, Man of Africa

Cooks also gave public lectures of Africanism between 1945 and 1966. Some include:

1. Passing the Baton Garvey to Cooks (June to December 1954)
2. Hair Conking; Buy Black (May–December 1955)
3. Gamal Abdel Nasser; Marcus Garvey Day (May–December 1955)
4. Ras and the Caste (January–December 1956)
5. Ethiopia; Haiti; Liberia; Kenya; the Black Woman (January–December 1966)
6. Native Africans; Civil Rights (April 3, 1966)
7. Religion (April 8, 1966)
8. Lucifer, God and Civil Rights (April 10, 1966)
9. The Caste Woman (April 15, 1966)
10. Organization ( April 15, 1966)
11. Yankee-Doodleism vs. Nationalism
12. Jews, Crackers and the Caste ( April 24, 1966)
