= 1980s in fashion =

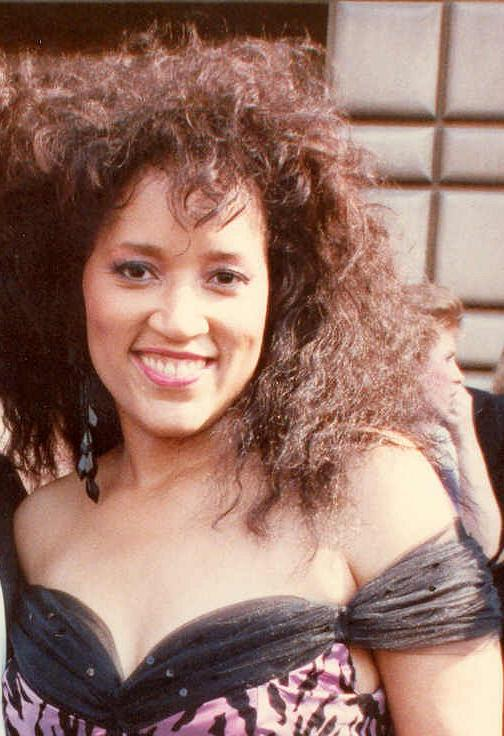
Among women, big hair typified the decade. (Jackée Harry, 1988)

Fashion of the 1980s was characterized by a rejection of psychedelic colored, ornate fashions of the 1970s. Punk fashion began as a reaction against both the hippie movement of the past decades and the materialist values of the current decade. The first half of the decade was relatively tame in comparison to the second half, which was when apparel became very bright and vivid in appearance.

One of the features of fashion in the second half of the 1980s was the interest in alternative forms. In the 1980s, alternative trends became widespread. This phenomenon has been associated with such phenomena as street style, punk and post-punk.

During the 1980s, shoulder pads, which also inspired "power dressing," became common among the growing number of career-driven women.

The women's shoe that typified the decade was the closed pump with a sharply tapered or pointed toe, first revived at the end of the seventies. These were similar to pumps worn during the second half of the 1950s and came in a variety of heel heights and tapered heel shapes, cone-shaped to spike to stiletto, almost always underslung. One of the ways to update an older outfit during the 1980s was to wear it with a pair of eighties pumps.

Hair in the 1980s was typically big, curly, bouffant and heavily styled. Television shows such as Dynasty helped popularize the high volume bouffant and glamorous image associated with it. Women in the 1980s wore bright, heavy makeup. Everyday fashion in the 1980s consisted of light-colored lips, dark and thick eyelashes, and pink or red rouge (otherwise known as blush).

Some of the top fashion models of the 1980s were Brooke Shields, Christie Brinkley, Inès de La Fressange, Jerry Hall, Elle MacPherson, Isabella Rossellini, Carol Alt, Gia Carangi, Paulina Porizkova, Kim Alexis, Kelly Emberg, Janice Dickinson, Kelly LeBrock, Joan Severance, Yasmin Le Bon, Renée Simonsen and Tatjana Patitz.

== Women's fashion ==
=== Early 1980s (1980–1983) ===
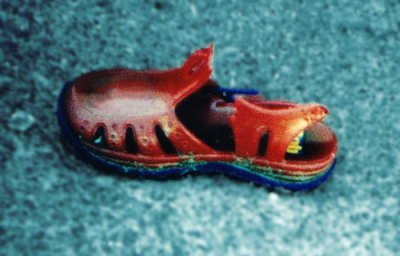
A jelly shoe.

==== Minimalism ====
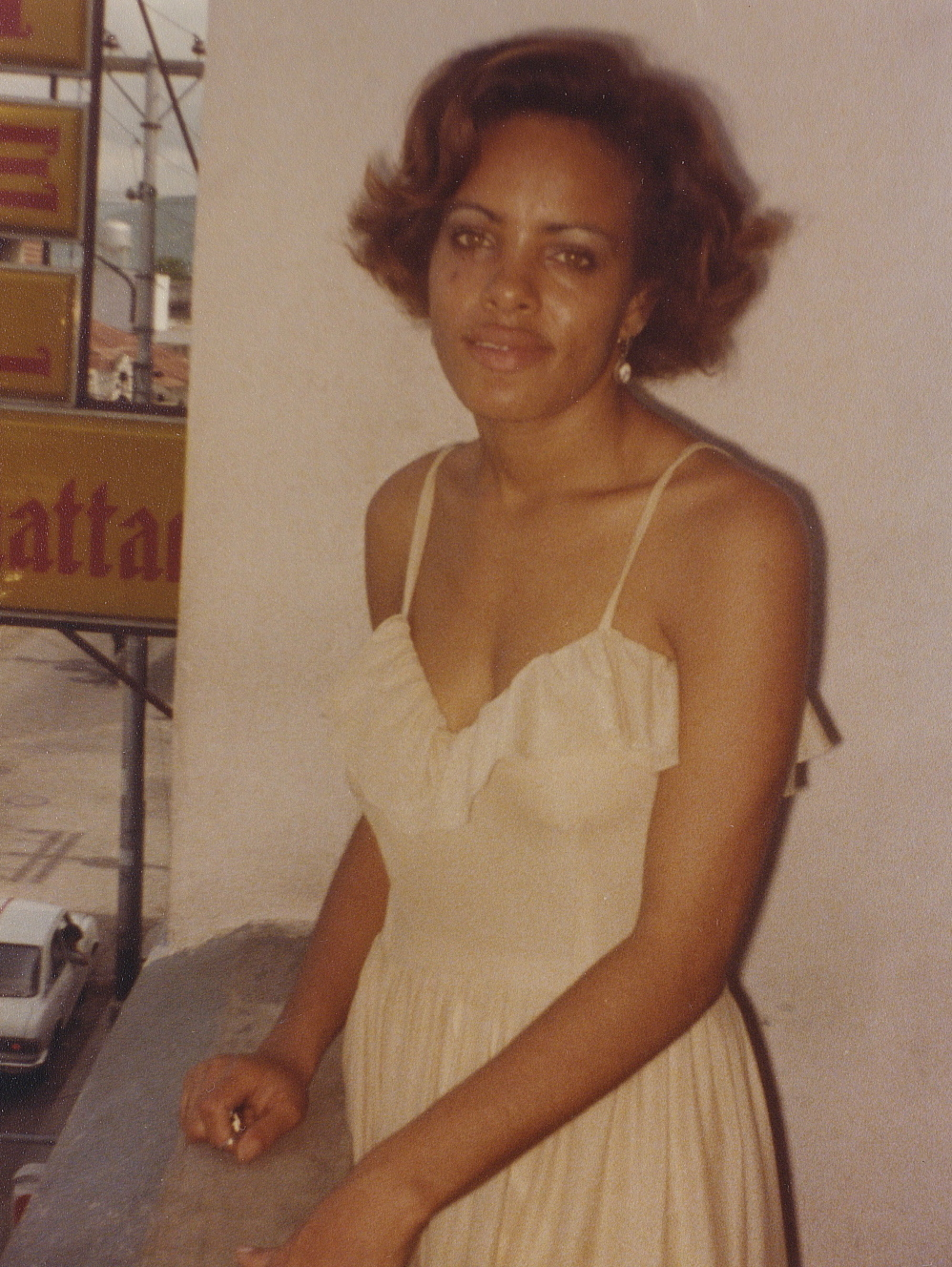
Young woman in 1980 wearing a low-cut spaghetti strap dress.

- The early 1980s witnessed a backlash against the brightly colored disco fashions of the late 1970s in favor of a minimalist approach to fashion, with less emphasis on accessories. In the US and Europe, practicality was considered just as much as aesthetics. In the UK and America, clothing colors were subdued, quiet and basic; varying shades of brown, tan, cream, and orange were common.
- Fashionable clothing in the early 1980s included unisex and gender-specific attire. Widespread fashions for women in the early 1980s included sweaters (including turtleneck, crew neck, and v-neck varieties); fur-lined puffer jackets; tunics; faux-fur coats; velvet blazers; trench coats (made in both fake and real leather); crop tops; tube tops; knee-length skirts (of no prescribed length, as designers opted for choice); loose, flowy, knee-length dresses (with high-cut and low-cut necklines, varying sleeve lengths, and made in a variety of fabrics including cotton, silk, satin, and polyester); high-waisted loose pants; embroidered jeans; leather pants; and designer jeans, though jeans were not as widely worn as during the 1970s. Women's pants of the 1980s were, in general, worn with long inseams, and by 1982 the flared jeans of the 70s had gone out of fashion in favor of straight leg trousers. Continuing a trend begun during the late 1970s, cropped pants and revivals of 1950s and early '60s styles like pedal-pushers and Capri pants were popular. 1981 saw a brief fall vogue for knickers.
- From 1980 until 1983, popular women's accessories included thin belts, knee-high boots with thick kitten heels, sneakers, jelly shoes (a new trend at the time), mules, round-toed shoes and boots, jelly bracelets (inspired by Madonna in 1983), shoes with thick heels, small, thin necklaces (with a variety of materials, such as gold and pearls), and small watches.

==== Aerobics craze ====
- The fitness craze of the 1970s continued into the early 1980s. General women's street-wear worn in the early 1980s included ripped sweatshirts, tights, sweatpants, and tracksuits (especially ones made in velour).
- Athletic accessories were a massive trend in the early 1980s, and their popularity was largely boosted by the aerobics craze. This included leg warmers, wide belts, elastic headbands, and athletic shoes known as 'sneakers' in the US or 'trainers' in the UK.

==== Increased formality and the color black ====
- Continuing a trend begun by designers in 1978, the early 1980s also saw a return to pre-sixties ideas of formality, with coordinated suits, occasion dressing like forties-fifties-revival cocktail dresses and evening dresses, and even a revival of hats and gloves, though neither was required for women as they had once been. This was just one trend among many of the era. Along with this went an increased prevalence of black being worn, a trend that can be traced both to high-fashion designers and to late seventies punk fashions and their successors.

==== Professional fashion ====
- In the 1970s, more women were joining the work force, so, by the early 1980s, working women were no longer considered unusual. As a way to proclaim themselves as equals in the job market, women started to dress more seriously at work. Popular clothes for women in the job market include knee-length skirts, wide-legged slacks, a matching blazer, and a blouse of a different color. Kitten-heeled shoes were often worn. Formal shoes became more comfortable during this period in time, with manufacturers adding soles that were more flexible and supportive. The shoes with moderately spiked heels and relatively pointy toes from the very late 1970s remained a fashion trend.

=== Mid-1980s (1984–1986) ===
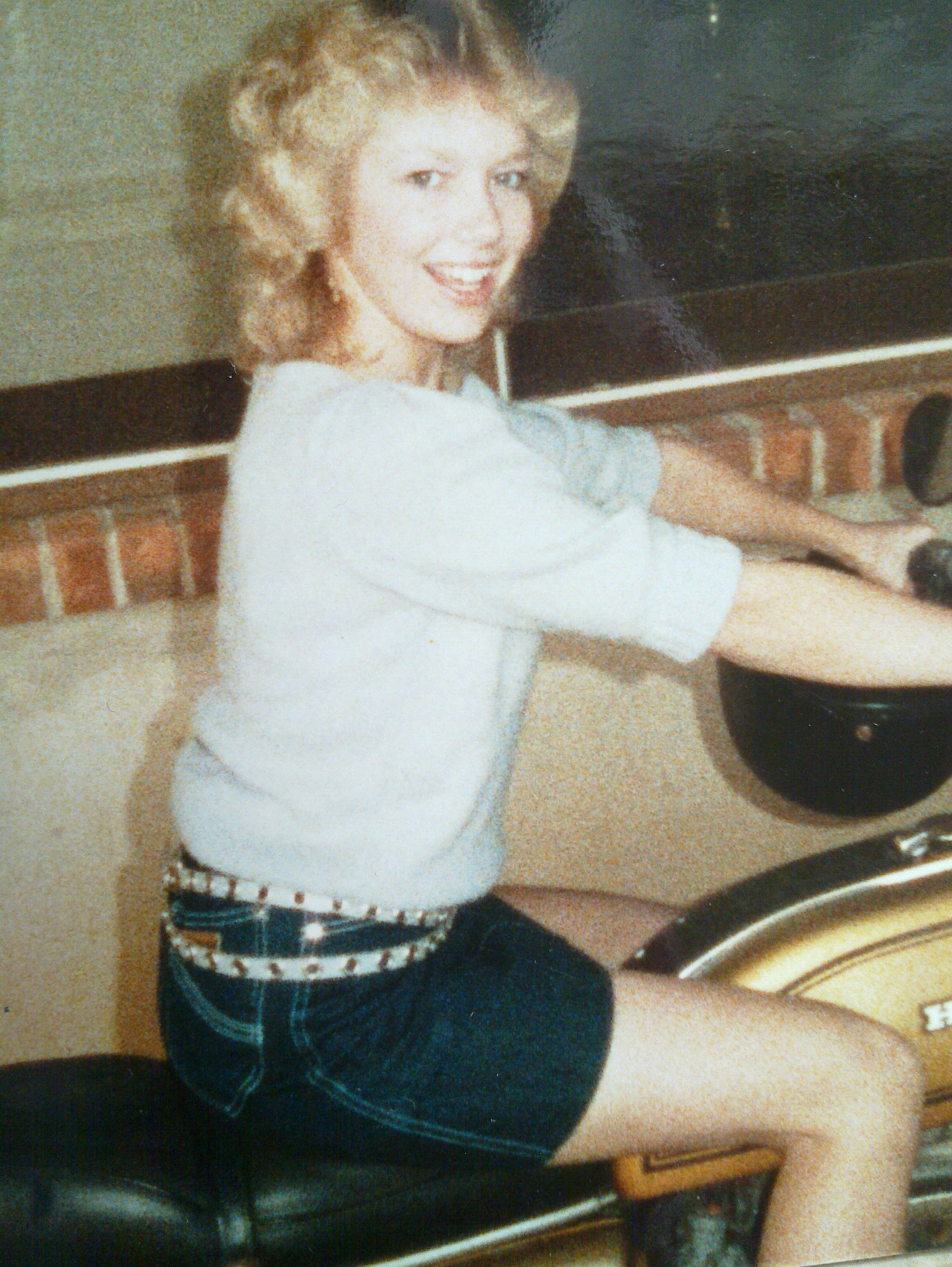
A young woman from the mid-1980s wearing a denim mini skirt with two thin belts or a single double-wrap belt.

==== Bright colors ====
- Women's fashion in the early 1980s became more colorful around 1982. This included long wool coats, long flared skirts, slim miniskirts, slightly tapered pants and stirrup ones, designer jeans, spandex cycling shorts, high waisted ankle length jeans and pants plain or pleated, extremely long and bulky sweaters, jumpsuits, pastel colors, "off-the-shoulder" sweatshirts over tight jeans, leather trenchcoats, fur coats, extremely large scarves, beanies, leather gloves, and dresses worn with wide or thin belts. The aerobics craze of the early 1980s continued into the mid-1980s, but the clothes became more colorful than they were before.
- At the same time, black continued its march toward ubiquity, becoming the new neutral, especially among the trendy. This reflected both the increased formality revived by high-fashion designers at the end of the seventies and the continuing influence of punk and its successors like postpunk and goth. It became more and more common to see not only black clothes but also stark black eyeliner, hair dyed black, black nail polish, and even black lipstick, on both sexes. Black would continue to dominate into the nineties.
- Among all the other looks available during the decade, there was a consistent dressy look seen of tailored, broad-shouldered suits, narrow skirt or trousers, and pumps, accessorized with sheer or colored hosiery, prominent belts, prominent earrings of various shapes and materials, and sometimes hats and gloves, a favorite among designers since 1978 that occasionally became popular with the public during the eighties, particularly gloves, which were available in a variety of lengths, shapes, colors, and materials.
- Women's shoes of the mid-1980s included strappy sandals, kitten-heeled sandals, pumps, ballet flats, boat shoes, slouchy flat boots, Keds, and white Sperry's sneakers.
- In the 1980s, rising pop star Madonna proved to be very influential to female fashions. She first emerged on the dance music scene with her "street urchin" look consisting of short skirts worn over leggings, necklaces, rubber bracelets, fishnet gloves, hairbows, long layered strings of beads, bleached, untidy hair with dark roots, headbands, and lace ribbons. In her album "Like a Virgin" phase, millions of young girls around the world emulated her fashion example that included brassieres worn as outerwear, huge crucifix jewelry, lace gloves, tulle skirts, and boytoy belts.
- Gloves (sometimes laced or fingerless) were popularized by Madonna, as well as fishnet stockings and layers of beaded necklaces. Short, tight Lycra or leather miniskirts and tubular dresses were also worn, as were cropped bolero-style jackets. Black was the preferred color. With the new fashion's most extreme forms, young women would forgo conventional outer-garments for vintage-style bustiers with lacy slips and several large crucifixes. This was both an assertion of sexual freedom and a conscious rejection of prevailing androgynous fashions.
- Many of the clothes worn by pop stars like Madonna during this period had their origins on the streets of London or came from London designers, as London retained the trend-setting reputation it had regained during the late seventies punk period with the work of Vivienne Westwood. In 1983–84, London designers like Katharine Hamnett, PX, BodyMap, and Crolla came to international attention, launching trends later picked up by savvy designers like Jean-Paul Gaultier in other fashion capitals, savvy pop figures like Madonna, and ultimately the general public. Many of the clothes worn by Madonna in 1983-85 – tube skirts, oversized tops, "Boy Toy" belt buckles, head wraps, and flat, black, buckled, pointy-toed ankle boots – were from avant-garde UK designers like PX, BodyMap, and Peter Fox, and the structured-bras-as-outerwear she sported during her stretch-lace-and-fingerless-gloves phase also came from the streets of Europe. The most internationally recognizable styles to come out of the London milieu were probably the large, tapestry-like floral prints from Crolla and the oversized "message shirts" with large block lettering from Katharine Hamnett. Crolla's giant cabbage rose prints, modeled after old chintz drapery fabric and needlework, seemed ubiquitous in 1984 and '85, initially shown by the designer on sixties-revival Nehru jackets and avant-garde UK street silhouettes like oversized sweaters and ankle-length tube skirts but soon picked up by Jean-Paul Gaultier in Paris and, before long, mass-marketed everywhere, especially popular in drop-waist, bertha-collared, puff-sleeved dresses to the lower calf put out by companies like Laura Ashley and worn with matching large hair bows on the back of the head. Katharine Hamnett's graphic "message shirts", oversized white t-shirts and tank tops with big, black, block lettering spelling out social and political messages opposing military buildup, supporting the environment, and other messages less clear, became iconic garments of the period, with Hamnett famously wearing an anti-nuclear one in the presence of Margaret Thatcher. Her "Choose Life" one, originally intended as a pro-environment message by the UK designer, was ironically picked up by supporters of the new anti-abortion movement in the US that had newly branded itself "pro-life" under Reagan's influence, a use Hamnett strongly opposed.

==== Power dressing ====
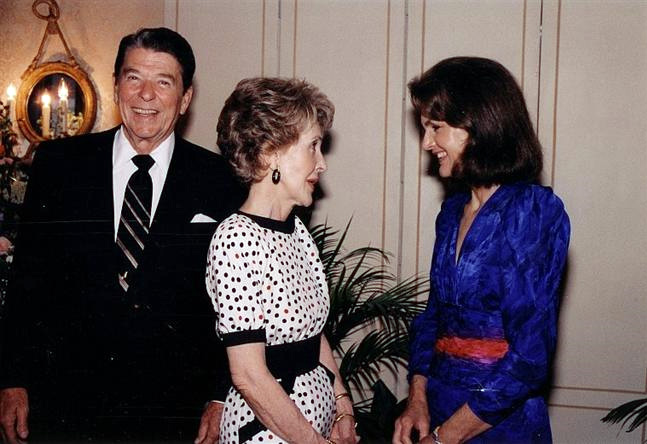
President Ronald Reagan and his wife, Nancy, are seen with Jacqueline Kennedy Onassis.

- Among the most prominent shoulder pad and power dress designers was Claude Montana, who was also known as "the King of the Shoulder Pad." Montana's shoulder pad style was credited with defining the "power dressing" era of the 1980s. Another prominent shoulder pad designer of the 1980s power dressing era was Thierry Mugler.
- The television prime time shows Dallas and, in particular, Dynasty influenced increasingly oversized shoulder pads. Shoulder pads, popularized by Joan Collins and Linda Evans from the soap opera Dynasty were popular from the mid-1980s to the early 1990s. Dallas, however, promoted displays of wealth involving jewelry and sparkling clothing. Meanwhile, women's fashion and business shoes revisited the pointed toes and spiked heels that were popular in the 1950s and early 1960s. Some stores stocked canvas or satin covered fashion shoes in white and dyed them to the customer's preferred color, preferably bright colors.
- By this period, women had become much more confident in the workplace and had advanced in their careers. In this decade, women wanted to fit into higher management levels by emulating a masculine appearance through fashion to look more capable. Hence, they would wear empowering garments that portrayed masculinity, thus making them seem more professional by fitting in with the male majority. This would be accomplished with attributes such as wider shoulders with the aid of padding and larger sleeves. Other items included dresses worn with skinny or thick belts, pleated or plain skirts, tights or pantyhose, above the ankle length pants sometimes worn with pantyhose or tights underneath, ballet flat dress shoes, long sweaters, boat shoes and slouchy flat short length boots.
- After the western economic boom of the mid-1980s, the younger generation had a decreased influence in fashion as they had less of an impact on the market. The main consumer became the older generations that were more financially stable and were influenced by international political news. Thatcherism was promoted in the UK by the British Conservative Party. The female leader of the British conservative party, Margaret Thatcher, in her power suit quickly became one of the most well-known symbols of the 1980s. Suits worn by Thatcher were usually single color toned with a matching hat, jacket and skirt, that ends below the knee. A wide shoulder and pearl necklace was also part of her regular attire. Her political style was straightforward, effective and sometimes criticized as not empathetic enough. But there is no doubt that her appearance portrayed her ability, power and authority, which is what a lot of working women at that era desired.

=== Late 1980s (1987–1989) ===
==== Consumer-friendly fashions ====
- From 1987 until the early 1990s, the mini skirt was the only length supported by fashion designers. Although skirts of any length were acceptable to wear in the years before, all attention was given to the short skirt, especially among teenage girls and young women worn with tights, pantyhose, leggings, or slouch socks. Shoulder pads became increasingly smaller. Accessories popular in Britain, France and America included bright-colored shoes with thin heels, narrow multicolored belts, berets, lacy gloves, beaded necklaces, and plastic bracelets.
- Women's apparel in the late 1980s included jackets (both cropped and long), coats (both cloth and fake fur), reversible inside-out coats (leather on one side, fake fur on the other), rugby sweatshirts, sweater dresses, taffeta and pouf dresses, baby doll dresses worn with capri leggings or bike shorts, slouch socks, and Keds or Sperrys or with opaque tights and flats or opaque tights and slouch socks, neon or pastel colored shortalls, denim pinafore dresses, Keds, Sperrys, ballet flats, jumpsuits, oversized or extra long t-shirts, sweaters, sweatshirts, blouses and button down shirts popularly worn with leggings and stirrup pants, miniskirts, stretch pants, tapered pants, high waisted ankle length jeans and pants plain or pleated skirts worn with leggings, dressed up leggings outfit of leggings with an oversized v-neck sweater over a turtleneck, slouch socks, Keds (shoes) or Sperrys, and bangs with a headband or ponytail and scrunchie, happy pants (homemade pants made in bold designs with bright colors), and opaque tights. Popular colors included neon hues, plum, gold, pinks, blues and bright wines, but black remained the neutral worn everywhere.

==== Asian fashion ====
- In Mainland China, the unisex Zhongshan suit declined after the death of Mao Zedong, the removal of the Gang of Four, and the liberalisation of trade links and international relations during the mid and late '80s. Wealthier Chinese women began wearing Western inspired fashions again, including red or yellow miniskirts in addition to the more typical shirt dresses, white plimsolls and dacron blouses.
- The late 1980s also witnessed the beginnings of Indo Western fashion and the haute couture fashion in India that would eventually gain global recognition in the 90s. Colors like red and white were popular, often with intricate embroidery. Although most women continued to wear the saree, Bollywood actresses also had access to Western designer outfits and locally designed garments like the Anarkali ballgown.
- Japanese fashion designers Yohji Yamamoto, Rei Kawakubo, and Issey Miyake started a new school of fashion during the late 1980s called "Japanese Avant-Garde Fashion", which combined Asian cultural inspiration with mainstream European fashion. The Japanese spirit and culture that they presented to Europeans caused a fashion revolution in Europe which continued to spread worldwide. Yamamoto, Kawakubo and Miyake redefined the concepts of deconstruction and minimalism that were used in fashion design worldwide by pioneering monochromatic, androgynous, asymmetrical, and baggy looks. Additionally, the designs were unisex which were inspired by the design of traditional Japanese kimono. According to Sun, "Traditional Japanese kimonos don't have strict rules for menswear or women's wear, therefore, for the basic style, kimonos have similar style and decoration for men and women". Geometric diamond patterns, horizontal stripes, crinolines, layered kimono inspired blouses, dresses made from a single piece of fabric, drop crotch Thai fisherman pants, space age inspired laser cut outfits, mesh, jackets with kanji motifs, and monochromatic black and white outfits were common, as was the use of the traditional Japanese colors red, mizudori and sora iro. In The Japanese Revolution in Paris Fashion, Kawamura describes this new concept: "[...] traditionally in Japanese society, sexuality is never revealed overtly, and this ideology is reflected in the style of kimono, especially for women, these avant-garde designers reconstructed the whole notion of women's clothing style; thus they do not reveal sexuality, but rather conceal it just like the kimono". The three designers set the stage for the beginning of postmodern interpretation on the part of those who design clothes that break the boundary between the West and the East, fashion and anti-fashion, and modern and anti-modern.

== Men's fashion ==
=== Early 1980s (1980–1983) ===
==== Athletic clothing ====
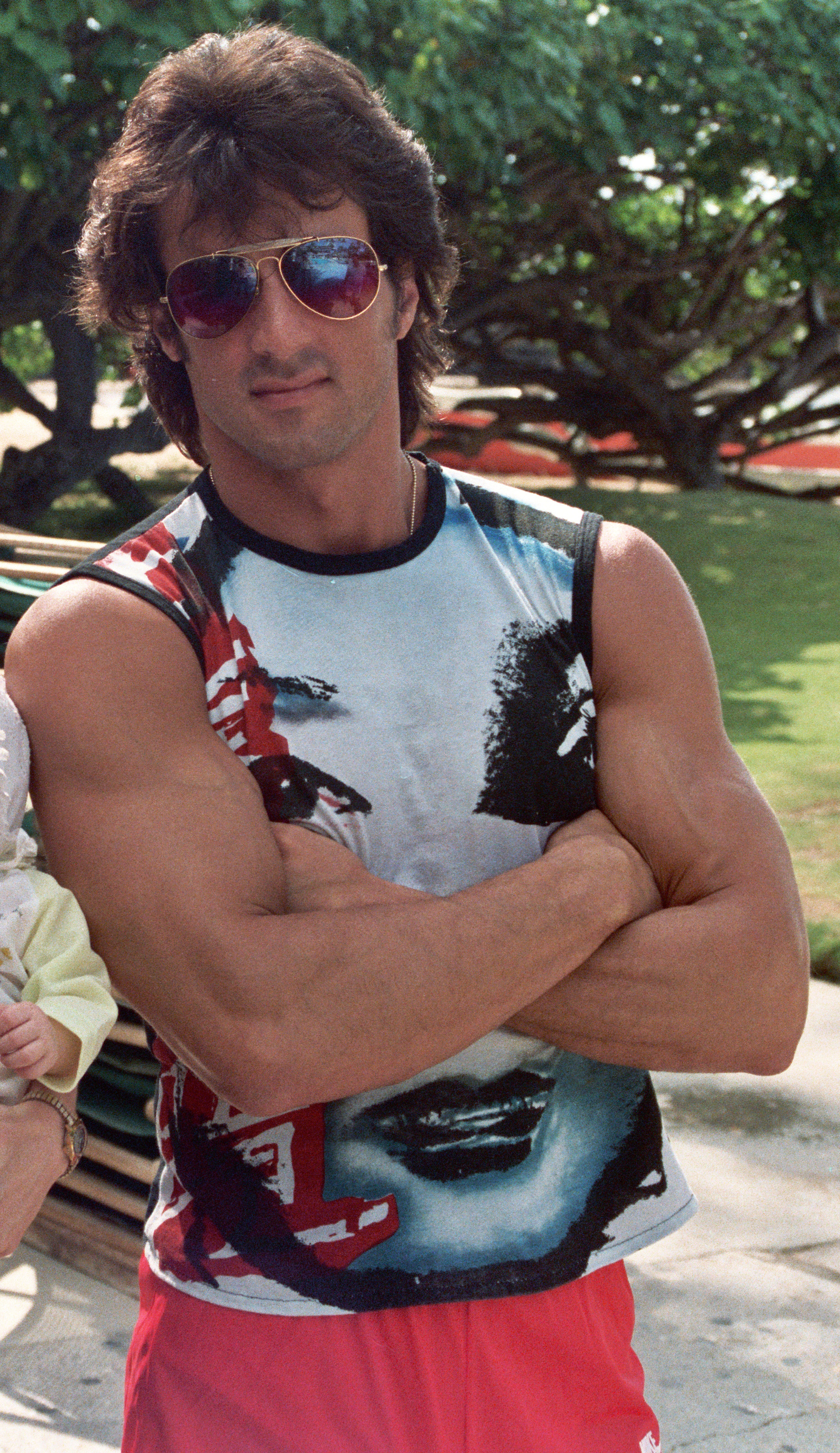
Sylvester Stallone in 1983

- In the early 1980s, fashion had moved away from the unkempt hippie look and overdressed disco style of the late 1970s. Athletic clothes were more popular than jeans during this period, as were more subdued colors. Popular colors were black, white, indigo, forest green, burgundy, and different shades of browns, tans, and oranges. Velour, velvet, and polyester were popular fabrics used in clothes, especially button-up and v shirts. Looser pants remained popular during this time, being fairly wide but straight, and tighter shirts were especially popular, sometimes in a cropped athletic style. The general public, at this time, wanted to wear low-maintenance clothing with more basic colors, as the global recession going on at the time kept extravagant clothes out of reach. Also worn were striped tube socks sometimes worn with the top folded over worn with shorts. It was not uncommon to see parents especially fathers wearing these along with their kids.
- Popular clothing in the early 1980s worn by men included tracksuits, v-neck sweaters, polyester and velour polo-neck shirts, sports jerseys, straight-leg jeans, jeans rolled to show off their slouch socks, polyester button-ups, cowboy boots, beanies, and hoodies. Around this time it became acceptable for men to wear sports coats and slacks to places that previously required a suit. In the UK, children's trousers remained flared, but only slightly.

==== New wave influence ====
- From the early to mid-1980s, post-punk and new wave music groups influenced mainstream male and female fashion. Commercially made slim-fitting suits, thin neckties in leather or bold patterns, striped T-shirts, Members Only jackets, clubwear, metallic fabric shirts, cat eye glasses, horn rim glasses with brightly colored frames, androgynous neon colored makeup, and pristine leather jackets were widely worn. Common hairstyles included a short quiff, and typical unisex colors for clothing included turquoise, teal, red, neon yellow and white on a blue screen.

==== Preppy look ====
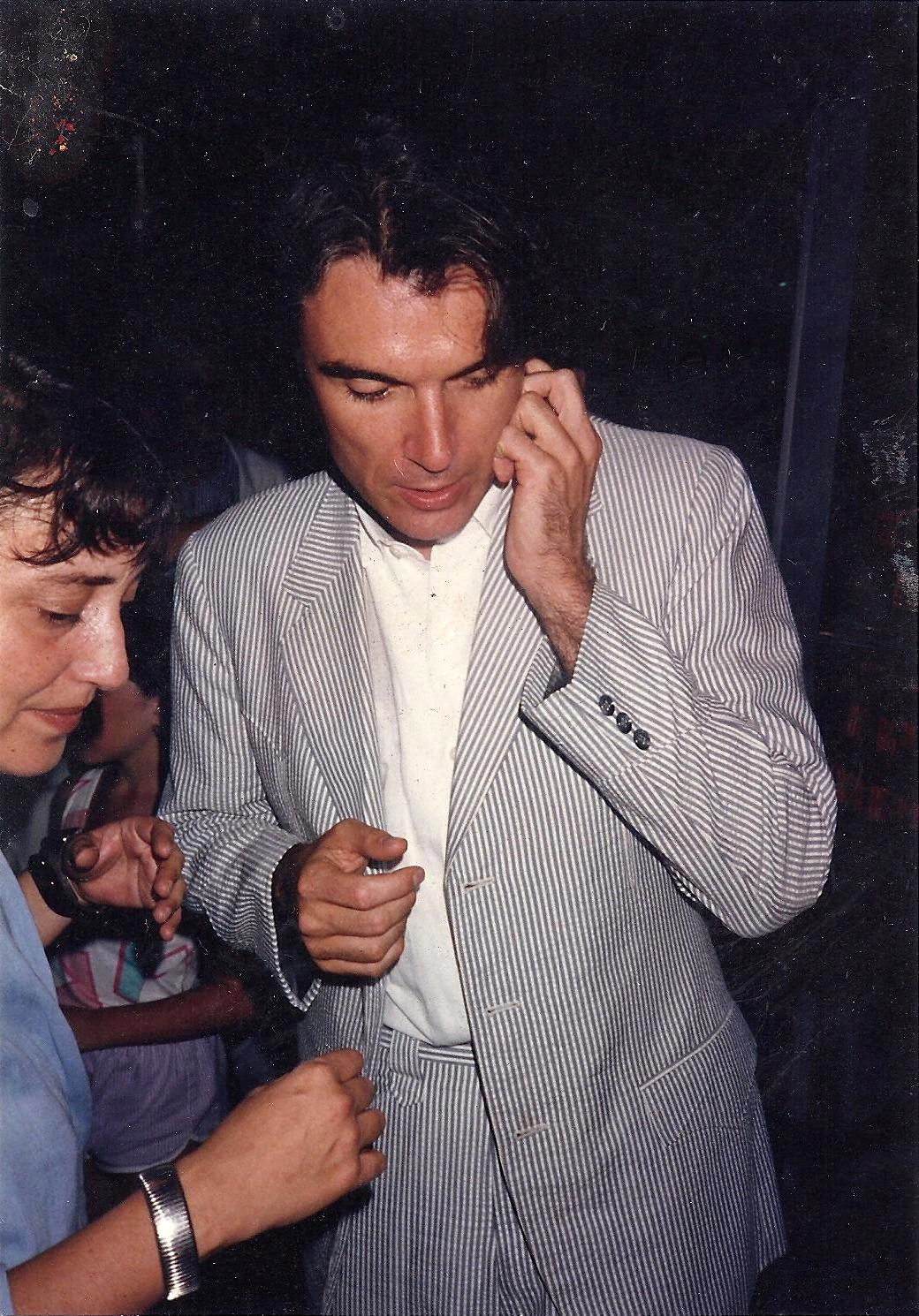
David Byrne wearing a preppy style seersucker suit and white Oxford shirt, 1986.

- In response to the punk fashion of the mid-late 1970s, there was a throwback to the 1950s Ivy League style. This revival came to be definitively summarized in an enormously popular paperback released in 1980: The Official Preppy Handbook. Popular preppy clothing for men included Oxford shirts, sweaters, turtlenecks, polo shirts with popped collars, khaki slacks, argyle socks, dress pants, Hush Puppies Oxford shoes, Sperrys boat shoes, Eastland boat shoes, brogues, suspenders, seersucker or striped linen suits, corduroy, and cable knit sweaters that were often worn tied around the shoulders.

==== Country style ====
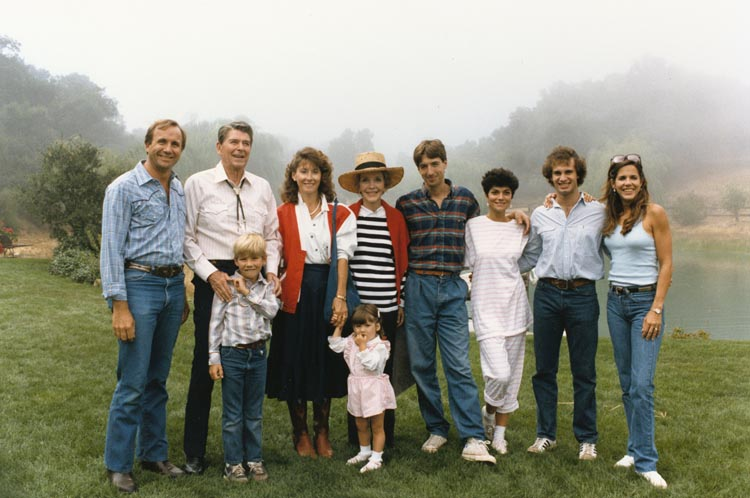
Ronald and Nancy Reagan in Western clothing, 1985

- From the late 70s until the mid 80s, Western clothing made a comeback in America due to a resurgence of interest in country music, line dancing, western films, heartland rock, contemporary movies like Urban Cowboy, television series like Dallas, sports like cowboy action shooting, and the fashions and culture of the 1950s. During the early 80s, many hard rock and southern rock artists from the 70s such as Alabama, .38 Special, The Flying Burrito Brothers, the Grateful Dead, and the Bellamy Brothers found renewed success playing country music. This style, sometimes derisively referred to as drugstore cowboy, urban cowboy or redneck chic, was popular not only in the Southwest, but also in urban areas. Western clothing was also popular in other places with a large country music fanbase especially Australia, Canada, the Republic of Ireland, and Southwest England. Cowboy boots, elaborately embroidered western shirts with pearl snaps inspired by Nudie Cohn's bespoke pieces, bolo ties, Stetsons, double denim "Texan tuxedos", jean jackets, and blue jeans were popular among both sexes. Notable trendsetters included Merle Haggard, Willie Nelson, Kenny Rogers, Dolly Parton, Stevie Ray Vaughan, president Ronald Reagan, Marty Stuart, action heroes like Chuck Norris, Patrick Swayze or Kevin Costner, and fashion designers like Steve Weil of Rockmount.

=== Mid-1980s (1984–1986) ===
==== Miami Vice/Magnum P.I. look and Michael Jackson's influence ====
- In the mid-1980s, popular trends included wool sport coats, Levi 501s, Hawaiian shirts, shell suits, hand-knit sweaters, sports shirts, hoodies, flannel shirts, reversible flannel vests, jackets with the insides quilted, nylon jackets, gold rings, spandex cycling shorts, cowboy boots, Sperrys boat shoes, Sperrys white sneakers, Eastland boat shoes, khaki pants with jagged seams, and through the end of the decade high waisted ankle length jeans and pants plain or pleated.
- The mid-1980s brought an explosion of colorful styles in men's clothing, prompted by television series such as Miami Vice and Magnum, P.I.. This resulted in trends such as t-shirts underneath expensive suit jackets with broad, padded shoulders, Hawaiian shirts (complemented with sport coats, often with top-stitched lapels for a "custom-tailored" look), and (in counterpoint to the bright shirt) jackets that were often gray, tan, rust or white. Easy-care micro-suede and corduroy jackets became popular choices, especially those with a Western style.
- Michael Jackson was also a big influence of teenage boys' and young men's fashions, such as matching red/black leather pants and jackets, white gloves, sunglasses and oversized, slouch shouldered faded leather jackets with puffy sleeves.

==== Power dressing ====
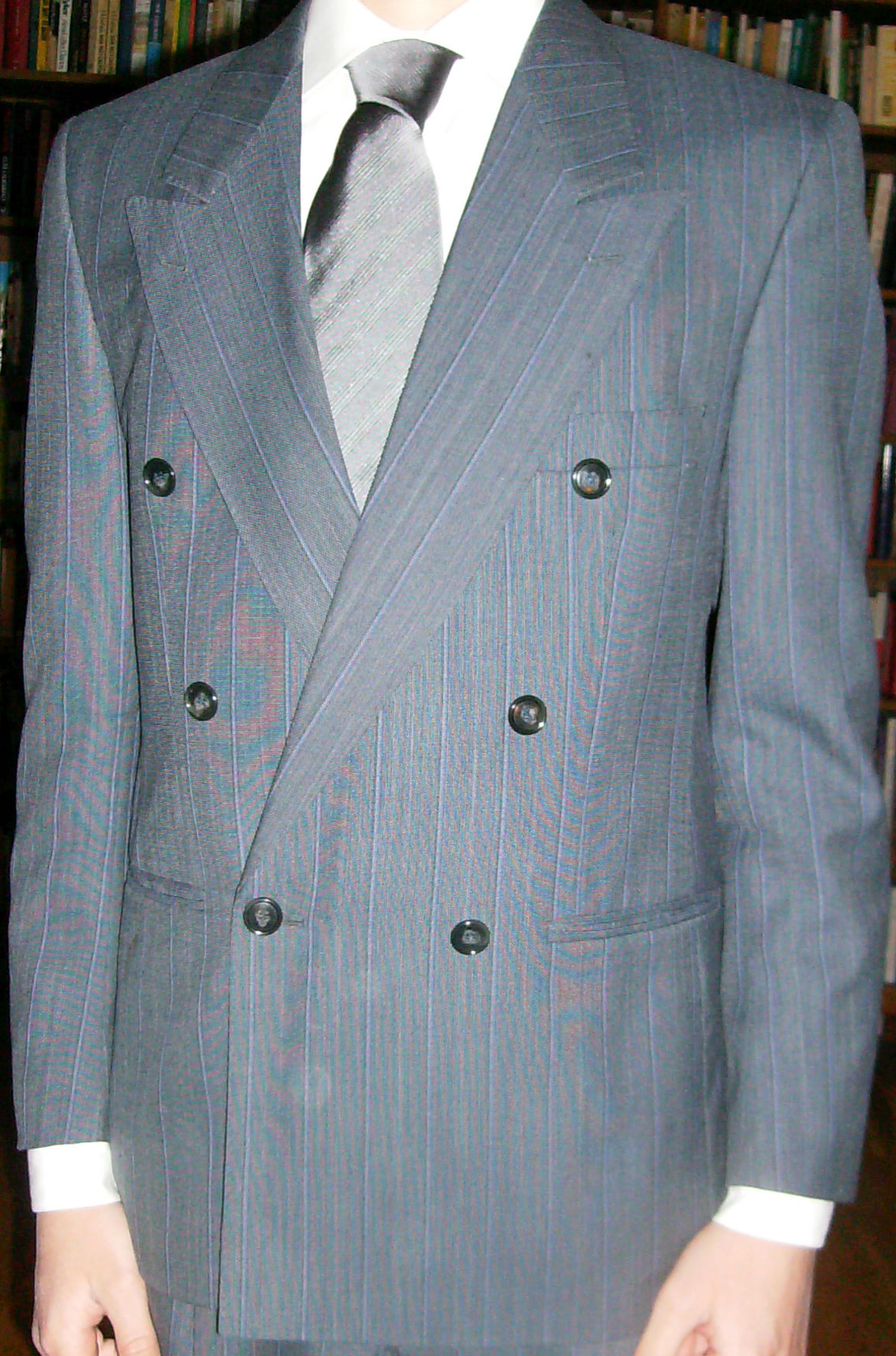
1940s inspired pinstripe suit with large shoulder pads and double breasted fastening. These "power suits" were fashionable in Britain from the early 1980s until the late 1990s.

- Men's business attire saw a return of pinstripes for the first time since the 1970s. The new pinstripes were much wider than in 1930s and 1940s suits but were similar to the 1970s styles. Three-piece suits began their decline in the early 1980s and lapels on suits became very narrow, akin to that of the early 1960s. While vests (waistcoats) in the 1970s had commonly been worn high with six or five buttons, those made in the early 1980s often had only four buttons and were made to be worn low. The thin ties briefly popular in the early '80s were soon replaced by wider, striped neckties, generally in more conservative colors than the kipper ties of the '70s. Double breasted suits inspired by the 1940s were reintroduced in the 1980s by designers like Giorgio Armani, Ralph Lauren, and Anne Klein. They were known as 'power suits', and were typically made in navy blue, charcoal grey or air force blue.

==== Tropical clothing ====
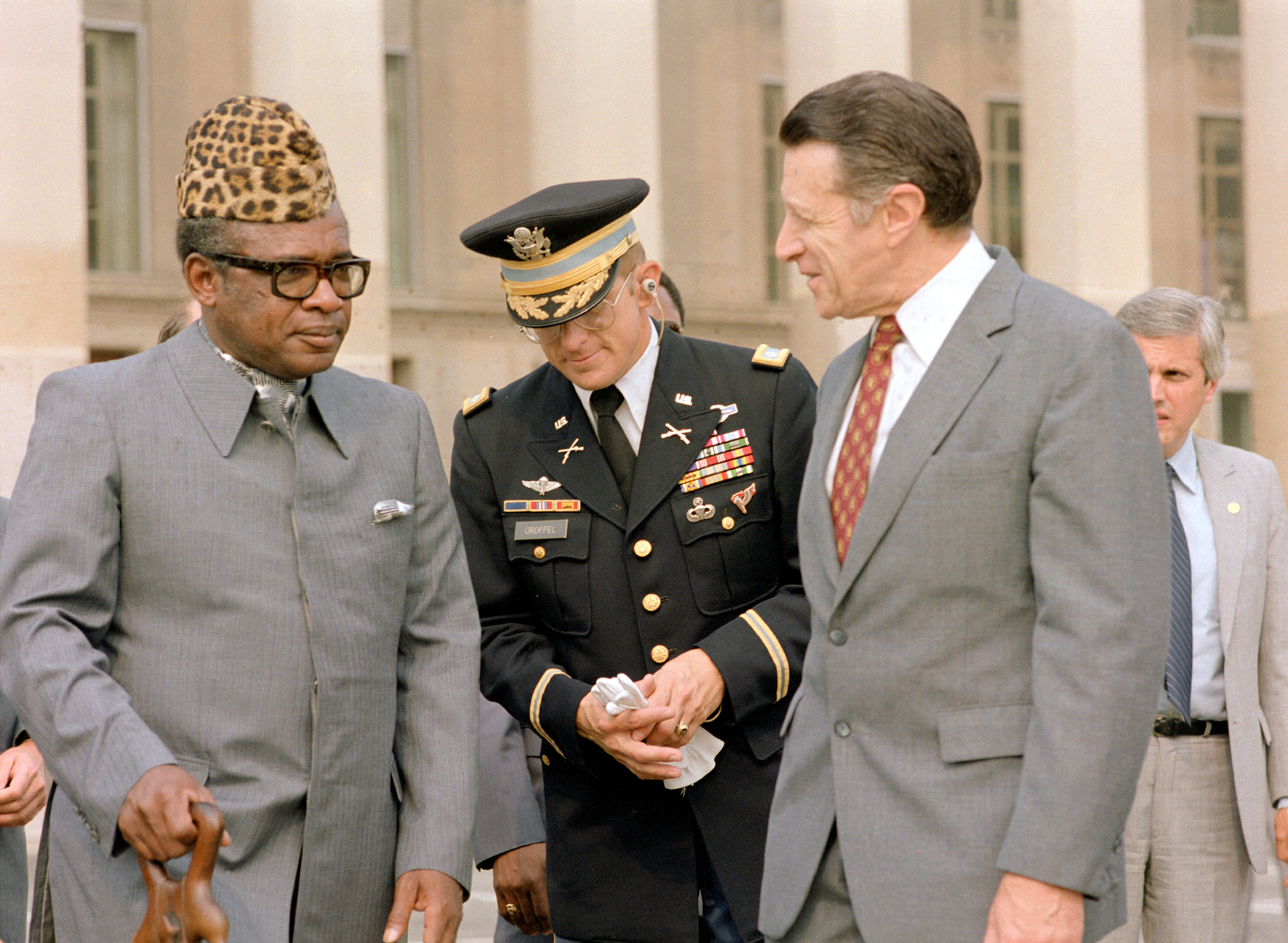
Mobutu wearing safari jacket, 1983.

- As an alternative to the power suit, the safari jacket, Nehru suit and Mao suit remained popular in Australia, South Africa, India, China, and Zaire, where it was known as an Abacost and worn with a leopard print hat resembling the Astrakhan cap. At the same time, young African dandies known as sapeurs rebelled against the post-decolonisation government's suppression of Western fashions by investing in expensive designer suits from Italy and France and listening to the soukous music of Papa Wemba. This continued until the kleptocratic dictator Mobutu's deposition and death in the late 1990s, when the outbreak of a civil war in Zaire resulted in the sapeurs' disappearance until the 2010s.
- In Hawaii, Aloha shirts and Bermuda shorts were worn on Aloha Fridays. By the end of the decade, when the custom of casual Fridays had spread to the US mainland, this outfit had become acceptable as daily Hawaiian business wear. Elsewhere in the Caribbean and Latin America, especially Mexico, Ecuador, Colombia, and Cuba, men wore the guayabera shirt for semi-formal occasions in imitation of the presidents Fidel Castro and Luis Echeverria.

=== Late 1980s (1987–1989) ===
==== Doc Martens ====
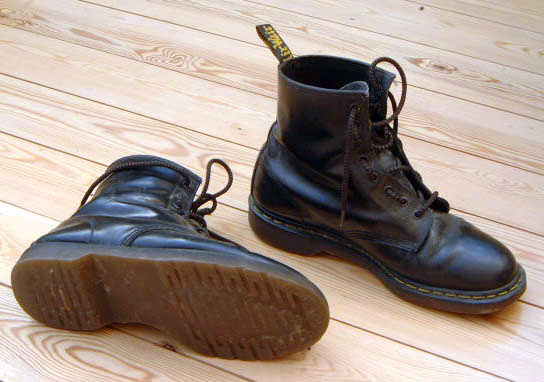
Dr. Martens boots

- Doc Martens were dark shoes or boots with air-cushioned soles that were worn by both sexes in the 1980s. Originally picked up as essential item by early 70's Skinheads the Cherry Red 8 lacehole boots they were an essential fashion accessory for the suedehead and punk subcultures in the United Kingdom. Sometimes Doc Martens were paired with miniskirts or full, Laura Ashley- style dresses. They were an important feature of the post-punk 1980s Gothic look which featured long, back-combed hair, pale skin, dark eyeshadow, eyeliner, and lipstick, black nail varnish, spiked bracelets and dog-collars, black clothing (often made of gabardine), and leather or velvet trimmed in lace or fishnet material. Corsets were often worn by girls. British bands that inspired the gothic trend include The Cure, Siouxsie and the Banshees, and The Cult. This trend would return in the 1990s.

==== Parachute pants ====
Parachute pants are a style of trousers characterized by the use of ripstop nylon or extremely baggy cuts. In the original tight-fitting, extraneously zippered style of the late 1970s and early 1980s, "parachute" referred to the pants' synthetic nylon material. In the later 1980s, "parachute" may have referred to the extreme bagginess of the pant. These are also referred to as "Hammer" pants, due to rapper MC Hammer's signature style. Hammer pants differ from the parachute pants of the 1970s and early 1980s. They are typically worn as menswear and are often brightly colored. Parachute pants became a fad in US culture in the 1980s as part of an increased mainstream popularity of breakdancing.

== Unisex accessories ==
Jewelry

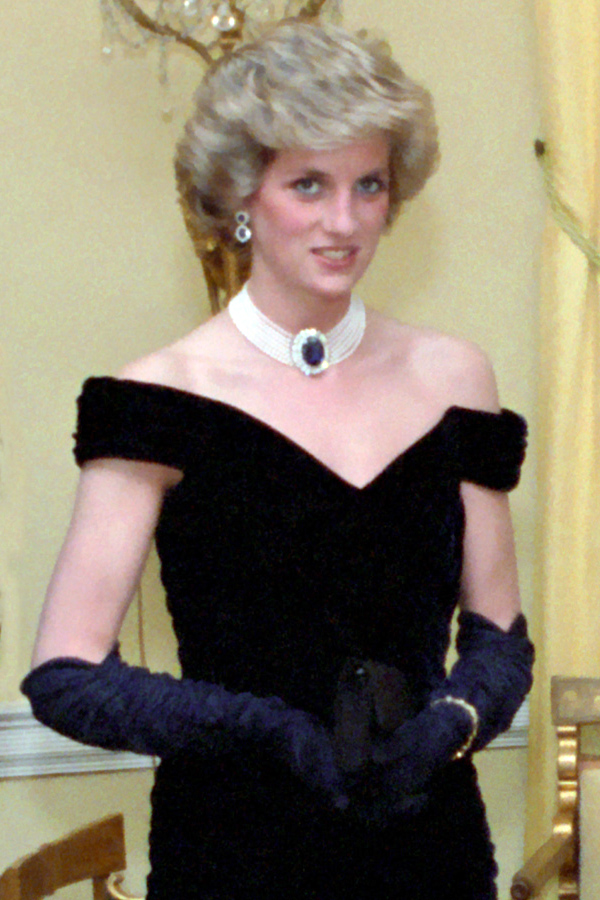
Princess Diana, 1985

- Earrings became a mainstream fashion for male teenagers. Jelly or thin metal bracelets (also known as bangles) were very popular in the 1980s, and would be worn in mass quantities on one's wrist. Designer jewelry, such as diamonds and pearls, were popular among many women, not only for beauty, but as symbols of wealth and power.

Watches

- At the beginning of the decade, digital watches with metal bands were the dominant fashion. They remained popular but lost some of their status in later years. Newer digital watches with built-in calculators and primitive data organizers were strictly for gadget geeks. Adult professionals returned to dial watches by mid-decade. Leather straps returned as an option. By the late 1980s, some watch faces had returned to Roman numerals. In contrast, one ultramodern status symbol was the Movado museum watch. It featured a sleek design with a single large dot at twelve o'clock. The Tank watch by Cartier was a fashion icon that was revived and frequently seen on Cartier advertisements in print. Rolex watches were prominently seen on the television show Miami Vice. Teen culture preferred vibrant plastic Swatch watches. These first appeared in Europe, and reached North America by the mid-1980s. Young people would often wear two or three of these watches on the same arm.

Eyewear

- In the first half of the 1980s, glasses with large, plastic frames were in fashion for both men and women. Small metal framed glasses made a return to fashion in 1984 and 1985, and in the late 1980s, glasses with tortoise-shell coloring became popular. These were smaller and rounder than the type that was popular earlier in the decade. Throughout the 1980s, Ray-Ban Wayfarers were extremely popular, as worn by Tom Cruise in the 1983 movie Risky Business.
- Miami Vice, in particular Sonny Crockett played by Don Johnson, boosted Ray-Ban's popularity by wearing a pair of Ray-Ban Wayfarers (Model L2052, Mock Tortoise), which increased sales of Ray Bans to 720,000 units in 1984.

== Subcultures of the 1980s ==
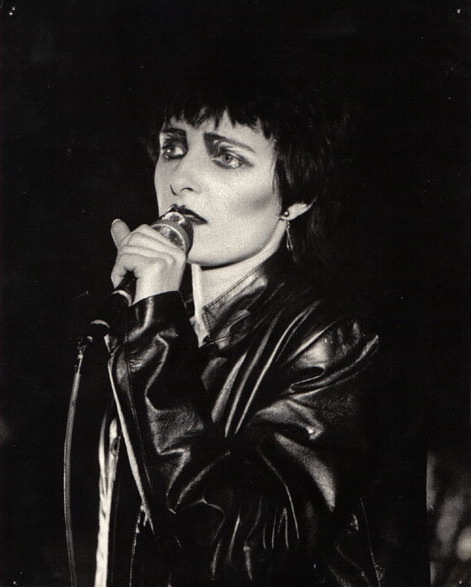
English singer Siouxsie Sioux wearing black clothing, back-combed hair, and heavy black eyeliner. She was an inspiration for the gothic fashion trend that started in the early 1980s.

Robert Smith of the Cure based his gothic look from Siouxsie Sioux's and being a guitarist in her band.

=== Heavy metal ===
- In the first half of the 1980s, long hair, leather rocker jackets (biker jackets) or cut-off denim jackets, tight worn-out jeans, and white, high trainers (sneakers) and badges with logos of favorite metal bands were popular among metalheads, and musicians of heavy metal and speed metal bands. However, by the mid-1980s the success of the glam metal scene had influenced the style worn by many mainstream metal fans. In addition to the traditional denim and leather look, mainstream heavy metal bands began to dress in more bright, colourful and theatrical clothing similar, in many ways, to the glam rock look of the 1970s. This included items such as spandex, platform boots, leg warmers and many different types of often spiked or studded leather accessories. In addition to this the long hair popular with metal fans was often worn teased. Makeup became popular with many metal bands as well often worn onstage for theatricality however many bands also began wearing makeup offstage also. The mainstream glam metal image of the mid- to late 1980s was often criticised by many underground metal fans as being too 'effeminate'. The mainstream glam metal (later called 'hair' metal) style would decline during the later half of the decade but would remain popular until the grunge movement in the early 1990s. In the second half of the 1980s, the original denim and leather clothing style was popular among musicians and fans of more extreme and niche (often underground) metal bands – thrash metal, crossover thrash, early black metal, and early death metal bands. It was popular particularly in the United States, but there were also large regional scenes in Germany, England, Canada, and Brazil. Although these styles of extreme metal would begin to adopt contrasting images during the ensuing decade.
- By the late 1980s, acid-washed jeans and denim jackets had become popular with both sexes. Acid washing is the process of chemically bleaching the denim, breaking down the fiber of material and forcing the dye to fade, thus leaving undertones of the original dye evidenced by pale white streaks or spots on the material. This became associated with the afformentioned heavy metal trend (called "hair metal" in later decades for the large frizzy coiffures worn by both male and female enthusiasts). Severely bleached and ripped jeans, either manufactured purposely or done by hand, become a popular fashion trend, being a main component of glam metal music acts such as Poison.
- The Japanese equivalent of glam metal, known as visual kei, emerged during the mid- to late 1980s and incorporated punk, goth and new wave influences. Brightly dyed, androgynous hair was common among shock rock bands like X Japan, together with studded leather borrowed from fetish fashion, traditional Geisha or Japanese opera inspired makeup, drag, and stylized 18th century fop rock costume such as frilly shirts, tall boots and long coats.

=== Punk ===
- Throughout the 1980s, the punk style was popular among people aged 18–22. Characterized by multi-colored mohawks, ripped stovepipe jeans, worn band tee-shirts, and denim or leather jackets. This style was popular among people who listened to punk music such as The Sex Pistols, and later, (despite the band's self-proclaimed rock'n'roll image) Guns N' Roses. Usually the denim jackets (which became an identity of the group) were adorned by safety pins, buttons, patches, and several other pieces of music or cultural memorabilia. Oftentimes, fans of the punk style would take random bits of fabric and attach them to their other clothes with safety pins. This soon became a popular way of attaching clothing, and it is now known as "pin shirts" with young women. The shirts are, essentially, rectangular pieces of fabric that are pinned on one side with safety pins. In the 1980s, a dressed down look (e.g. buzzed hair, T-shirts, jeans and button up shirts) was also very popular with people involved in punk rock, more specifically the hardcore punk scene. The Circle Jerks frontman Keith Morris said "Some of those punk rock kids they interviewed were a little over the top, but the thing historically is – the L.A./Hollywood punk scene was basically based on English fashion. But we had nothing to do with that. Black flag and the Circle Jerks were so far from that. We looked like the kid who worked at the gas station or submarine shop." Punk dress was not simply a fashion statement. It epitomized a way of thinking and seeing oneself as an individual cultural producer and consumer. In this way, punk style led many people to ask further questions about their culture and their politics.

=== New Romantic ===
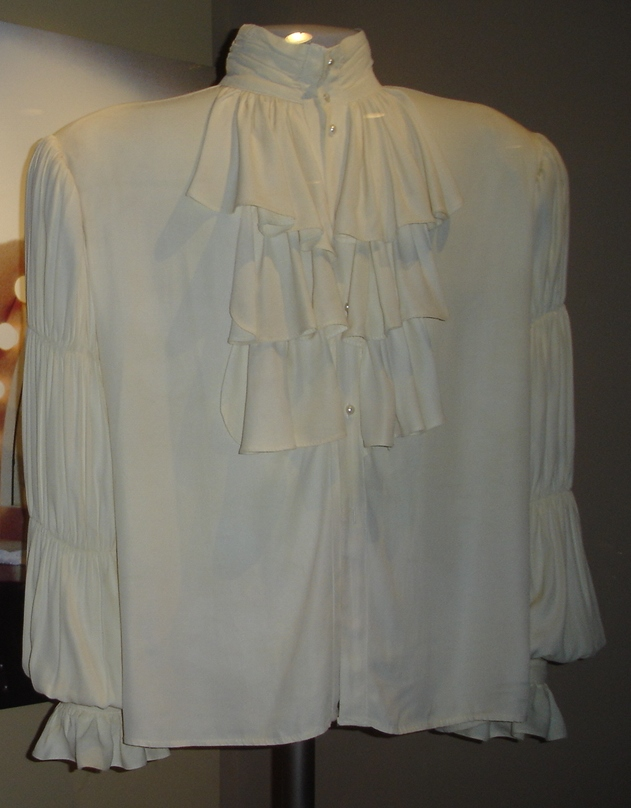
Seinfeld's pirate shirt, a New Romantic fashion staple during the 80s.

- The origins of the New Romantic fashion and music movement of the early 1980s is often attributed to the Blitz Kids who frequented the club Blitz in London, especially David Bowie. Bowie even used the Blitz's host Steve Strange in his music video for Ashes to Ashes. The New Romantics and those involved with the punk scene had inspired each other because of the concentration of influential individuals going to the same clubs and having the same circle of friends. Vivienne Westwood and Malcolm McLaren were also directly involved in the movement, such as dressing the members of Bow Wow Wow. The band leader and later solo artist, Adam Ant, and Westwood had highly influenced each other as well (Adam Ant being one of the leading icons of the New Romantics). Westwood's first runway collection, Pirates AW 1981-2 is often cited as a New Romantic collection which was both influenced by and highly influential to the movement. The garments in Pirates had asymmetrical necklines, flowy pirate shirts and breeches. The collection was very well received by critics and buyers. However, the designer's interference in the originally DIY fashion was not taken well by some of the participants, such as Boy George who left Bow Wow Wow to form his own band (Culture Club) and who cited one of the reasons for leaving as the way Vivienne Westwood would not let him dress himself.
- The Blitz Kids described the movement as a retaliation to punk due to it becoming too violent and unsavory crowds such as neo-Nazis and skinheads deciding to jump on that aesthetic bandwagon. It was also a way to forget their relative poverty following the economic recession and the Winter of Discontent. Features of New Romantic clothing varied from individual to individual, although these generally highlighted the implied individualism, creativity and self-expression of the movement, besides its continued adherence to the DIY ethic of punk. It was inspired by different cultures and time periods, films, film noir, and theatricality. Men often wore dramatic cosmetics and androgynous clothing, including ruffled poet shirts, red or blue hussar jackets with gold braid, silk sashes, tight pants, shiny rayon waistcoats, and tailcoats based on those worn during the Regency era. Women, too, were very theatrical in terms of makeup and style, and often favoured big hair, fishnet gloves, corsets, crushed velvet, and elements of Middle Eastern and gypsy clothing.

=== Rockabilly ===
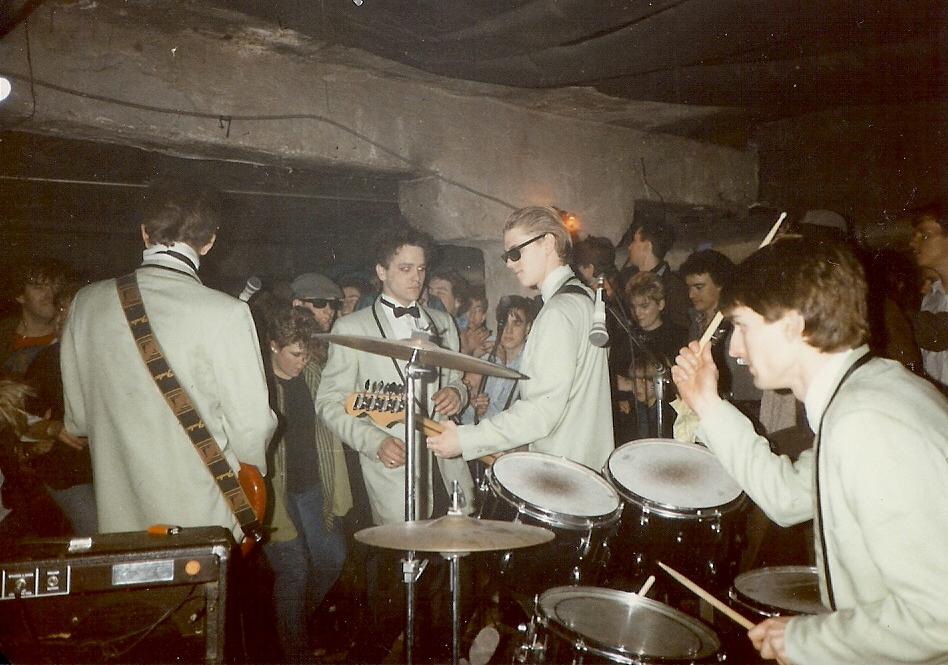
Garage rock and psychobilly band the U-Men wearing Teddy Boy outfits, early to mid -1980s.

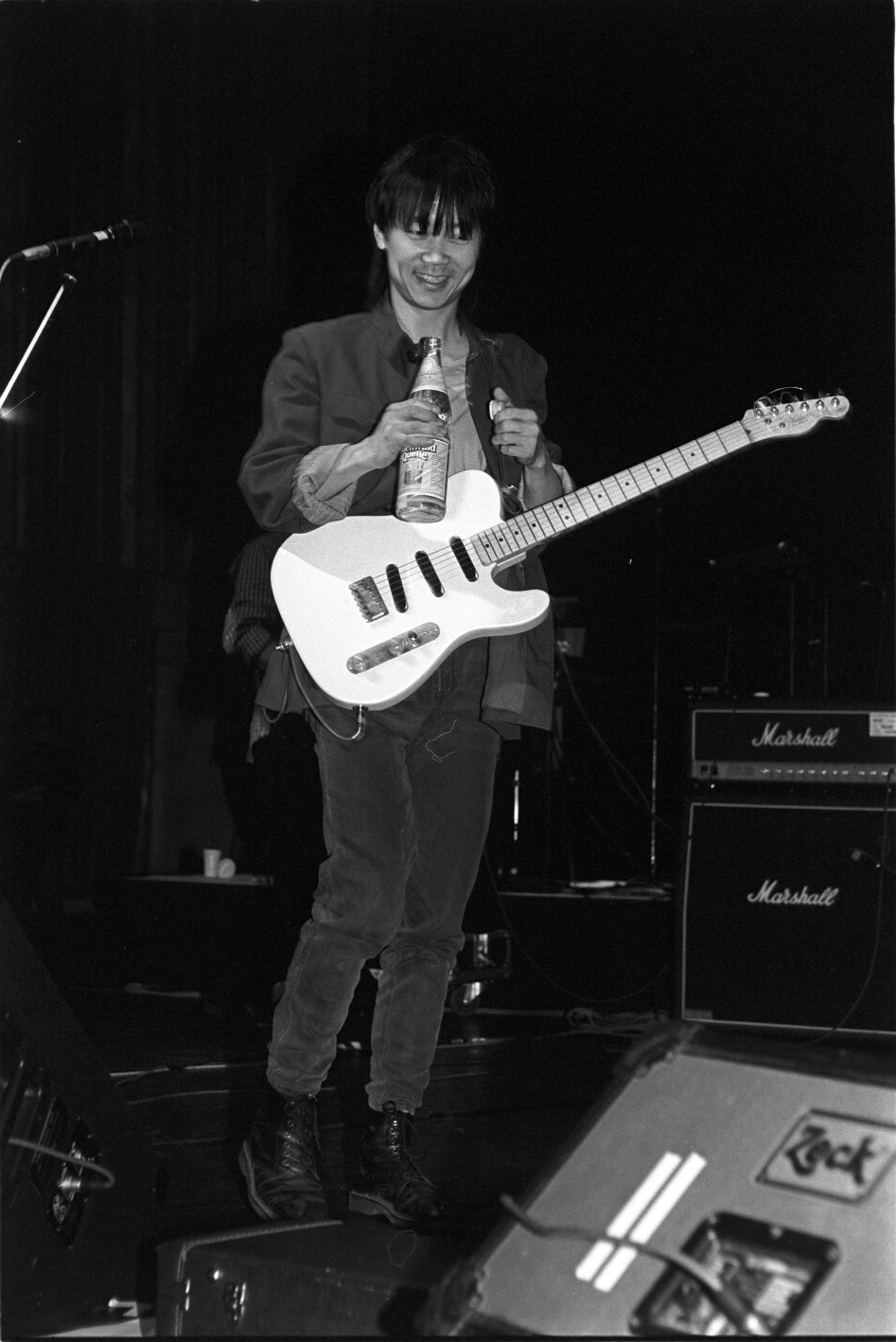
Chinese singer-songwriter Cui Jian's fashion style was widely mimicked by Chinese youth in the mid-to-late 1980s.

- In the early 1980s, the Teddy Boy look was popular in the UK among fans of groups like the Stray Cats, Crazy Cavan, Levi and the Rockats, or Shakin Stevens. Common items of clothing included drape jackets (generally in darker shades than those of the 1970s), drainpipe trousers, brothel creepers, bolo ties, white T-shirts, baseball jackets, hawaiian shirts, and black leather jackets like the Schott Perfecto. Common hairstyles included the quiff, pompadour, flat top, and ducktail.
- The French rockabilly scene of the early to mid-1980s was closely linked with the street punk subculture, had a large black and Arab following, and was involved with antifascist squaddism. The Black Dragons identified themselves with the leather jacket wearing greaser antiheroes, rebels and outcasts, and often fought the neonazi skinheads.
- In the mid-to-late 1980s, young Chinese groups emulated the fashion style of Chinese rock musicians like Cui Jian, including long hair, jeans, T-shirts, and boots, adopting it as a counterculture symbol.

=== Rude boys and skinheads ===
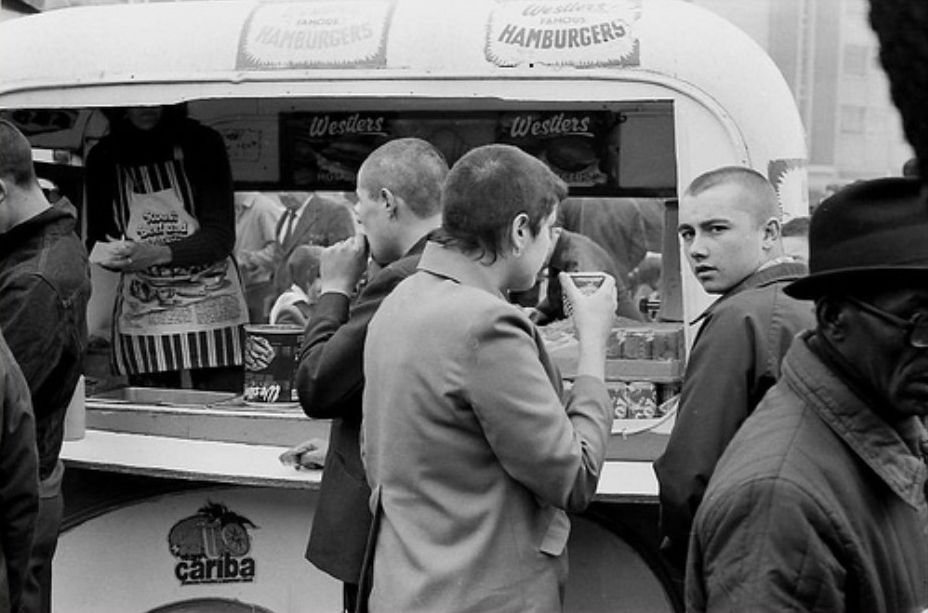
British skinheads in 1981

- Following on from the mod revival of the late 70s, the UK witnessed a revival of rude boy and skinhead fashion due to the popularity of ska punk, Oi! punk rock, rocksteady, and two tone music during the winter of discontent. In the early 80s, slim fitting mohair, tonic and houndstooth suits were popular, together with basket weave shoes, polo shirts, sta-prest trousers, Doc Martens, braces, Harrington jackets and pork pie hats popularized by bands like the Specials, UB40, the Bosstones, and Madness. In response to the racism of white power skinheads, 1980s rude boys wore checkerboard motifs to signify that both black and white people were welcome. Crew cuts and buzzcuts were worn by both sexes, and girls often incorporated hair bangs in a partially shaven style known as a Chelsea mohawk. In Brighton, the Skins of the 1980s fought the outlaw bikers and rockabilly guys, as the Mods and Rockers had previously done in the 60s.

=== Casuals ===
- The football casual subculture first appeared in the UK around 1983, when many ex-skinheads began dressing in designer clothing and sportswear to blend into the crowd and avoid police attention at football games. Popular clothing for English and Scottish casuals included Burberry coats, Stone Island, Lacoste, Ben Sherman and Fred Perry polo shirts, tracksuits, bomber jackets, Adidas, Nike, or Reebok sneakers, Fila or Ellesse jackets, flat caps, baseball caps, soccer shirts, and scarfs or bobble hats in their club's colours. Although shaved heads remained the most common haircut, some fans also wore undercuts, Caesar cuts, mod haircuts, and short mullet haircuts. During the late 80s, Casuals mostly listened to acid house, British pop, and later indie rock or Madchester but a hip-hop influenced offshoot of the subculture, known as chavs, appeared during the late 1990s and early 2000s.

=== Skaters ===
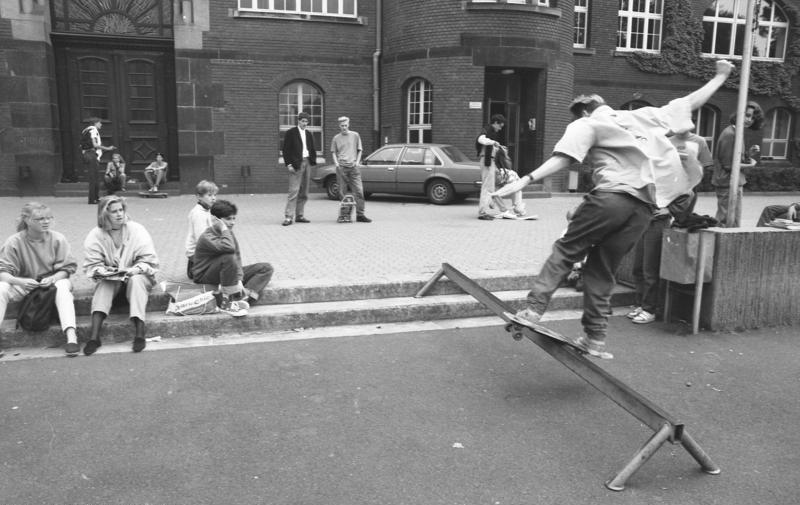
West German skate punks of the late 80s.

- In the Soviet Union, Australia, East Germany, and America, the skater subculture reached the height of popularity in the mid-'80s. Unlike the hippie and surfer influenced skaters of the 70s, the skaters of the 80s overwhelmingly preferred sportswear and punk fashion, especially baseball caps, red waffle plaid shirts, sleeveless T-shirts, baggy pants or Jams shorts resembling pajamas, checkered wristbands, striped tube socks, and basketball shoes like Converse All Stars and Vans. Brightly colored T-shirts became fashionable by the end of the decade, often featuring psychedelic eyes, skulls, Ed Roth inspired cartoon characters, palm trees, iron crosses, or the logos of skateboard brands like Stüssy, Tony Hawk, Mooks or Santa Cruz. The longer surfer hair was replaced with edgy hardcore punk and street punk inspired styles like the bowl cut or Hitler Youth haircut.

=== Rap and hip-hop ===
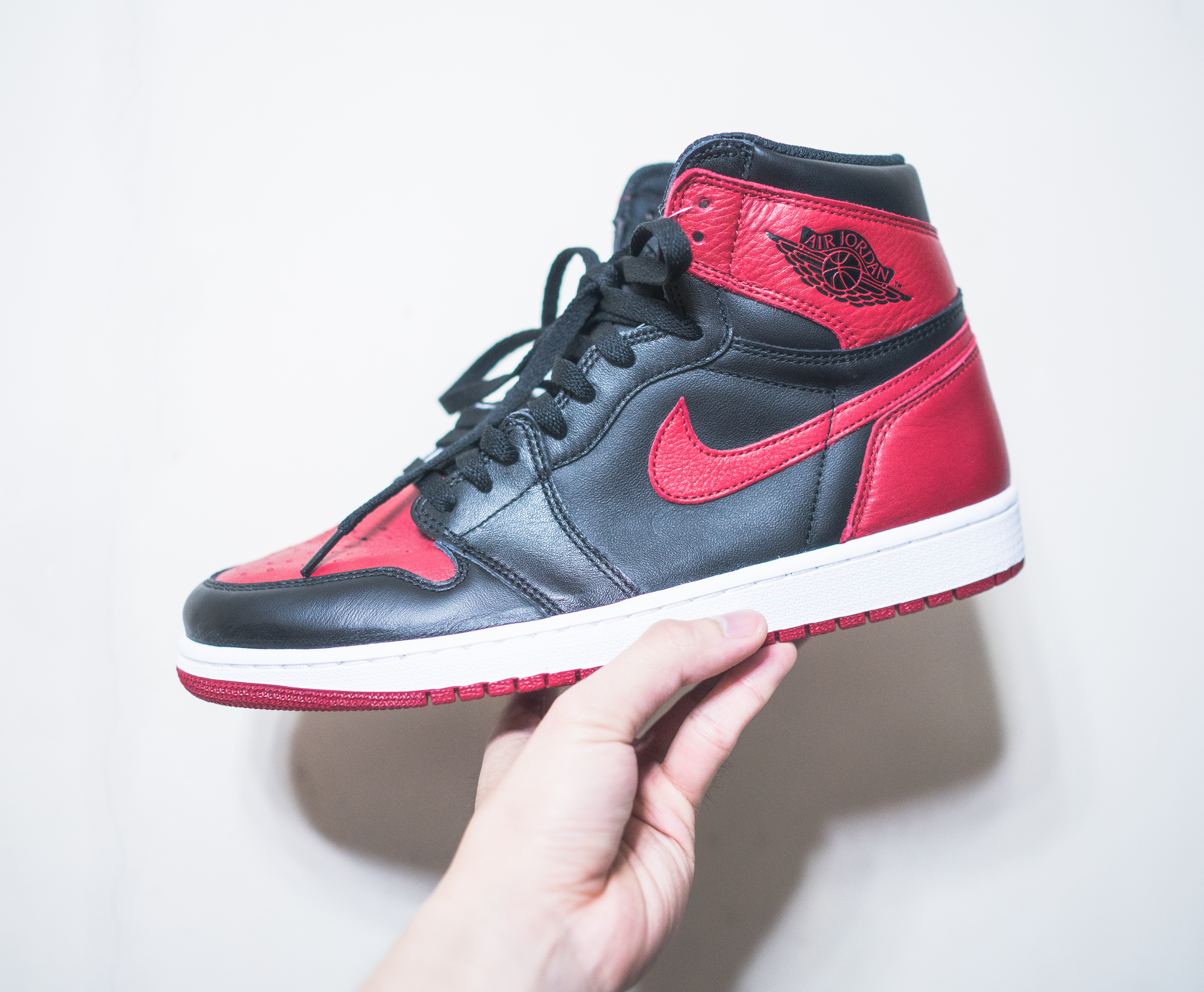
Air Jordan 1 Bred

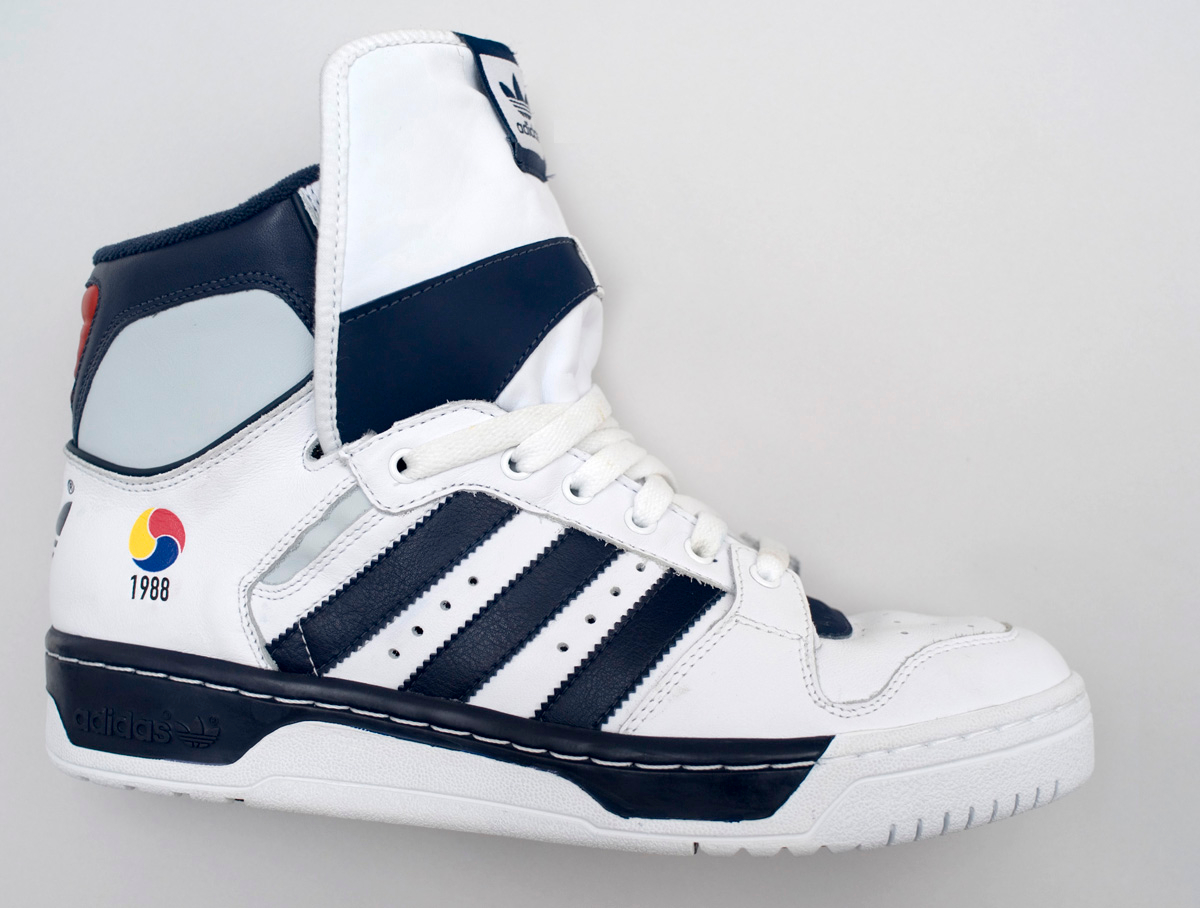
Hi top Adidas sneakers

- Sports shoes had been worn as casual wear before, but for the first time they became a high-priced fashion item. Converse shoes were popular in the first half of the 1980s. In 1984, Nike introduced the first ever Air Jordan sneaker, the Air Jordan 1 (named for basketball player Michael Jordan). Although most believe this shoe was banned by the NBA due to the sneaker being too flashy and distracting, others believe it was actually, the predecessor, the Nike Air Ship that was under scrutiny. Nike used this controversy between Air Jordan and the NBA to market the sneaker. The Air Jordan 1 was released in the royal blue color way to the public in 1985 and was an immediate success, still retaining its value in the fashion world today. Soon, other manufacturers introduced premium athletic shoes.
- Adidas sneakers were also a successful brand of the decade, becoming popular among teenage boys and young men. The growth of pop-culture and hip-hop influence allowed group Run-D.M.C. to make the Adidas Superstar (commonly known as the shell toe) one of the most sought-after shoes of the 1980s. Following their single "My Adidas", Adidas reportedly gave them $1 million endorsement deal. Nike had a similar share of the market, with the Air Max and similar shoes such as the Air Force One which was released in 1982. High-tops, especially of white or black leather, became popular. Other sportswear brands released popular shoes - Reebok had the Reebok Pump, Converse released the Cons and New Balance had the Worthy 790.
- In the early 1980s, long and white athletic socks, often calf-high or knee-high, were worn with sneakers. As the decade progressed, socks trended shorter, eventually topping out just above the height of the shoe. Run-D.M.C. and other hip-hop groups also influenced the apparel industry. Wearing track suits and large chains necklaces, they popularised sportswear brands such as Fila, Puma, Reebok, Nike, Avia and Adidas. Individuals in the culture also frequently wore bucket hats, oversized jackets and t-shirts, and high contrast colors. Fashion in hip-hop was a way to surpass the poverty that surrounded the community.
- According to Chandler and Chandler-Smith (2008), rap and hip-hop were not one specific style, but rather a mix between high-end luxury fashion and what was on the street. Harlem designer and shop-owner Dapper Dan embodied this concept by redesigning luxury products and making them available to those who would not typically associate themselves with it. Dapper Dan was most famous for deconstructing a Louis Vuitton garment and turning it into his signature jacket. He reconstructed garments for many music icons and celebrities in the 1980s before getting shut down by lawyers in the early 1990s. This interest in luxury apparel expanded past Dapper Dan - American fashion brands Tommy Hilfiger, Ralph Lauren, and Nautica were expanding rapidly and embraced by hip-hop culture as an indicator of status.
- The mass-market appeal of hiphop style also reached high fashion and avant-garde designers beginning in the early eighties, as creatives like London's Vivienne Westwood put out three-tongued versions of athletic footwear and produced graffiti prints for fabric. The graffiti often associated with eighties hiphop was a particularly strong influence on the arts in the early to mid-eighties, with contemporary art directly influencing the fashion world for the first time since the Op Art of the mid-1960s. Artists like Keith Haring, Kenny Scharf, and Jean-Michel Basquiat garnered attention for their graffiti-inspired work and several designers came out with graffiti-print fabrics, as well as garments actually spray-painted with graffiti or painted in a graffiti style, including Stephen Sprouse, Vivienne Westwood, Sue Clowes, and a number of others.
- Ensembles featuring the Pan-African colors - green, yellow and red, and red, black and green - became popular among African Americans, as did kente cloth. In the urban hip-hop communities, sneakers were usually worn unlaced and with a large amount of gold jewelry, as well as head wraps.

=== Preppy ===
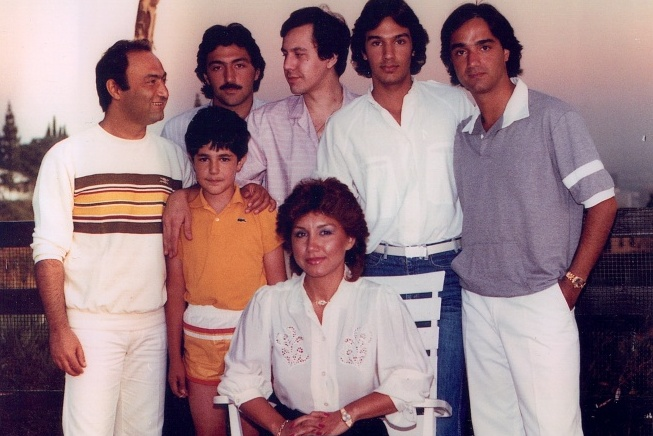
Young Iranian men wearing casual preppy outfits in 1981

- Wealthy teenagers, especially in the United States, wore a style inspired by 1950s Ivy League fashion that came to be known as "preppy". Preppy fashions are associated with classic and conservative style of dressing and clothing brands such as high waisted ankle length jeans and pants plain or pleated, Izod Lacoste, Brooks Brothers, and Polo Ralph Lauren. An example of preppy attire would be a button-down Oxford cloth shirt, Ascot tie, cuffed khakis, and tasseled loafers, Keds, Sperry or Eastland Boat shoes, white Sperry sneakers, or ballet flats. Throughout the 1980s and 1990s, preppy fashions featured a lot of pastels, turtleneck sweaters for girls, knee high socks sometimes turned down or folded over at the top with above the knee length skirts and dresses and polo shirts with designer logos. Other outfits considered "preppy" included cable knit cardigans or argyle pattern sweaters tied loosely around the shoulders, dress shorts with knee socks, dressed up leggings outfits from the mid-1980s on which consisted of leggings with an oversized v-neck sweater over a turtleneck, slouch socks, Keds (shoes) or Sperrys, and bangs with a headband band or ponytail and scrunchie. The European equivalent, known as Sloane Rangers, dressed similarly but frequently incorporated tweed cloth British country clothing, burberry mackintoshes, mustard corduroy pants, rain boots, padded hairbands, and ancestral jewellery such as pearl necklaces.

== Hairstyles ==
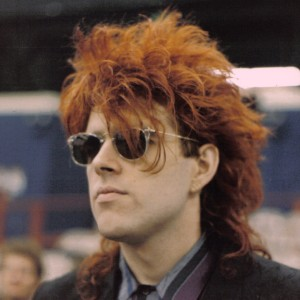
Tom Bailey of the Thompson Twins in 1986.

=== Women's hairstyles ===
Although straight hair was the norm at the beginning of the decade, as many late-1970s styles were still relevant, the perm had come into fashion by 1980.

Big and eccentric hair styles were popularized by film and music stars, in particular among teenagers but also adults. These hairstyles became iconic during the mid-1980s and include big bangs worn by girls from upper elementary, middle school, high school, college and adult women. There was generally an excessive amount of mousse used in styling an individual's hair, which resulted in the popular, shiny look and greater volume. Some mousse even contained glitter.

Beginning in the late 80s, high ponytails, side ponytails, and high side ponytails with a scrunchie or headband became common among girls from upper elementary, middle school, high school, college and adult women.

=== Men's hairstyles ===
By 1983, short hair had made a comeback for men, in reaction to the shag and mod haircuts of the mid- to late '70s. The sideburns of the 1960s and 1970s saw a massive decline in fashion, and many guys wore regular haircuts and quiffs. Beards went out of style due to their association with hippies, but moustaches remained common among blue collar men.

From the mid-1980s until the early 1990s, mullets were popular in suburban and rural areas among working-class men. This contrasted with a conservative look preferred by business professionals, with neatly groomed short hair for men and sIeek, straight hair for women. Some men also wore bangs in styles such as regular frontal or side swept bangs but they were not as big as women or girls bangs. Hairsprays such as Aqua Net were also used in excess by fans of glam metal bands such as Poison.

During the late 80s, trends in men's facial hair included designer stubble. Teenagers and young men with medium length hair often parted it down the middle or sides.

== Image gallery ==
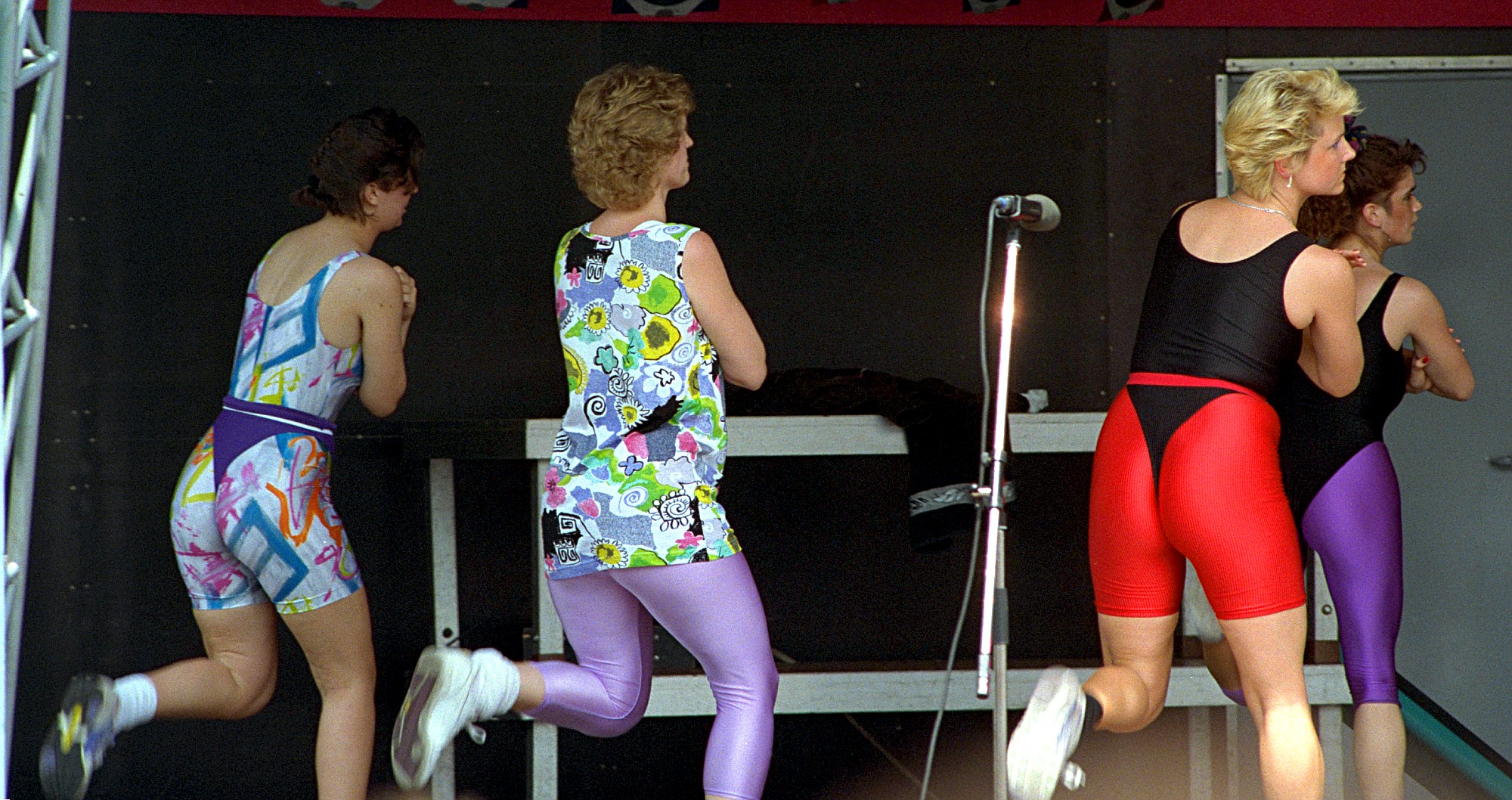
Women in aerobics leggings, 1985.

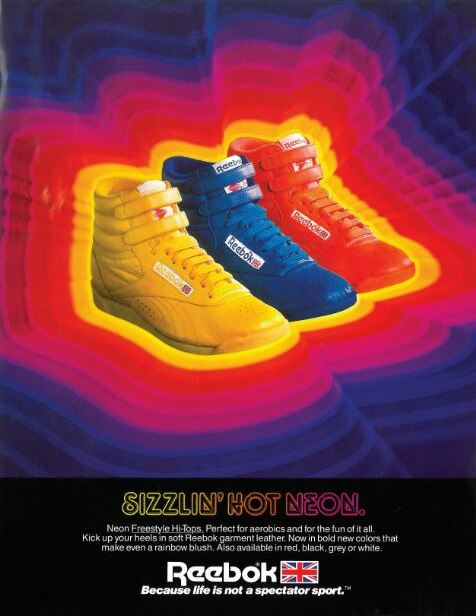
Reebok Freestyle sneakers advertisement, 1985.

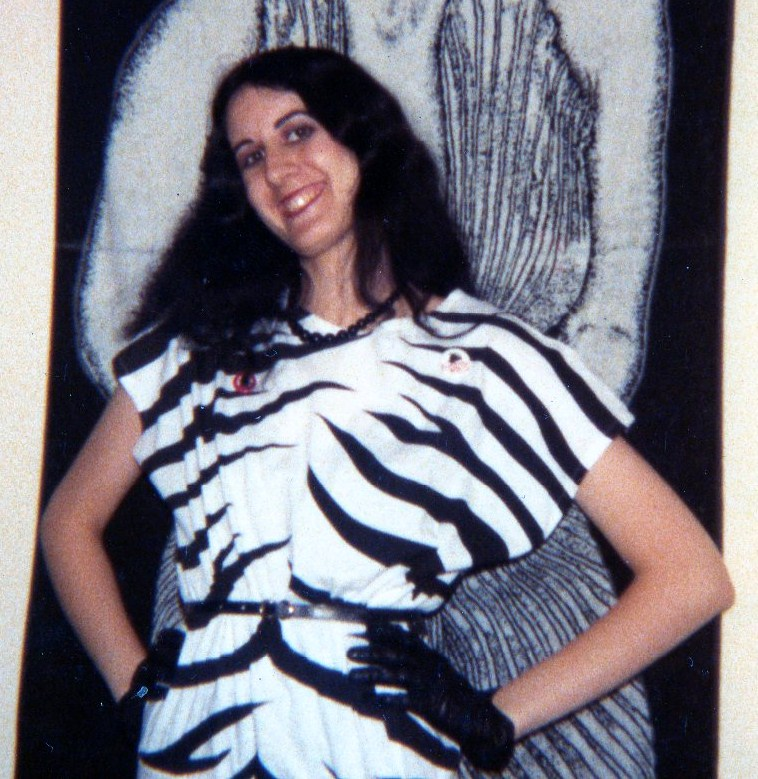
Girl in 1980.

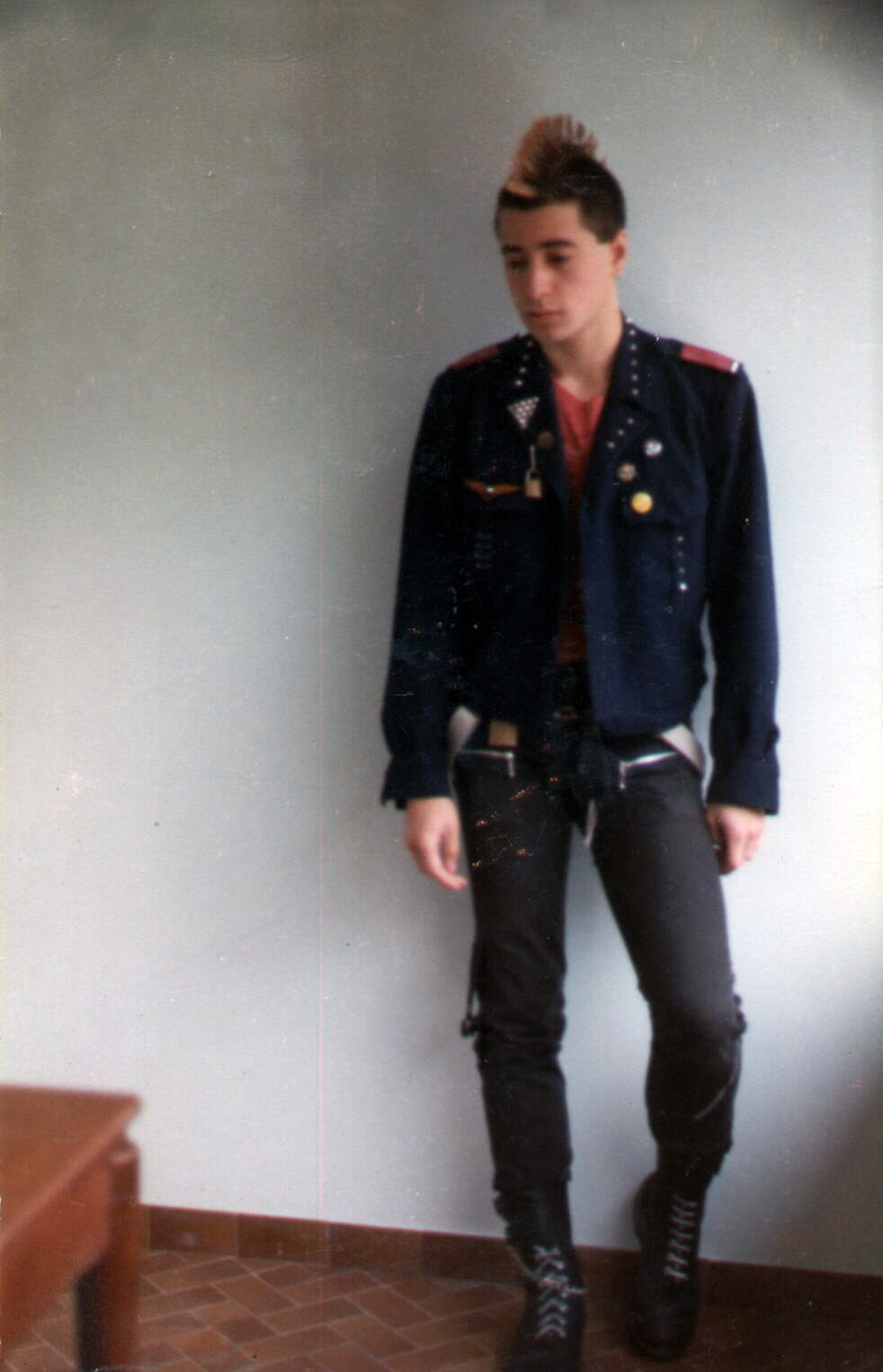
A French punk, 1981.

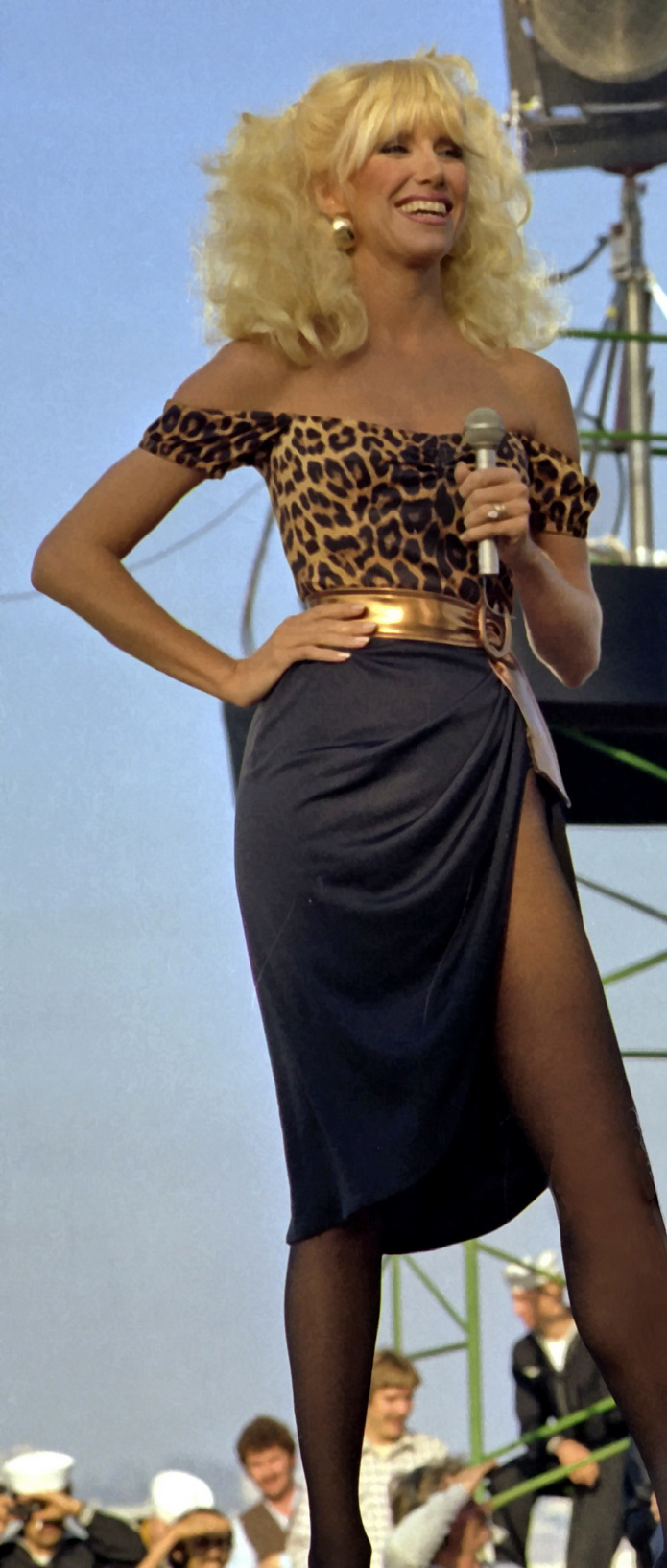
American actress Suzanne Somers in 1981.

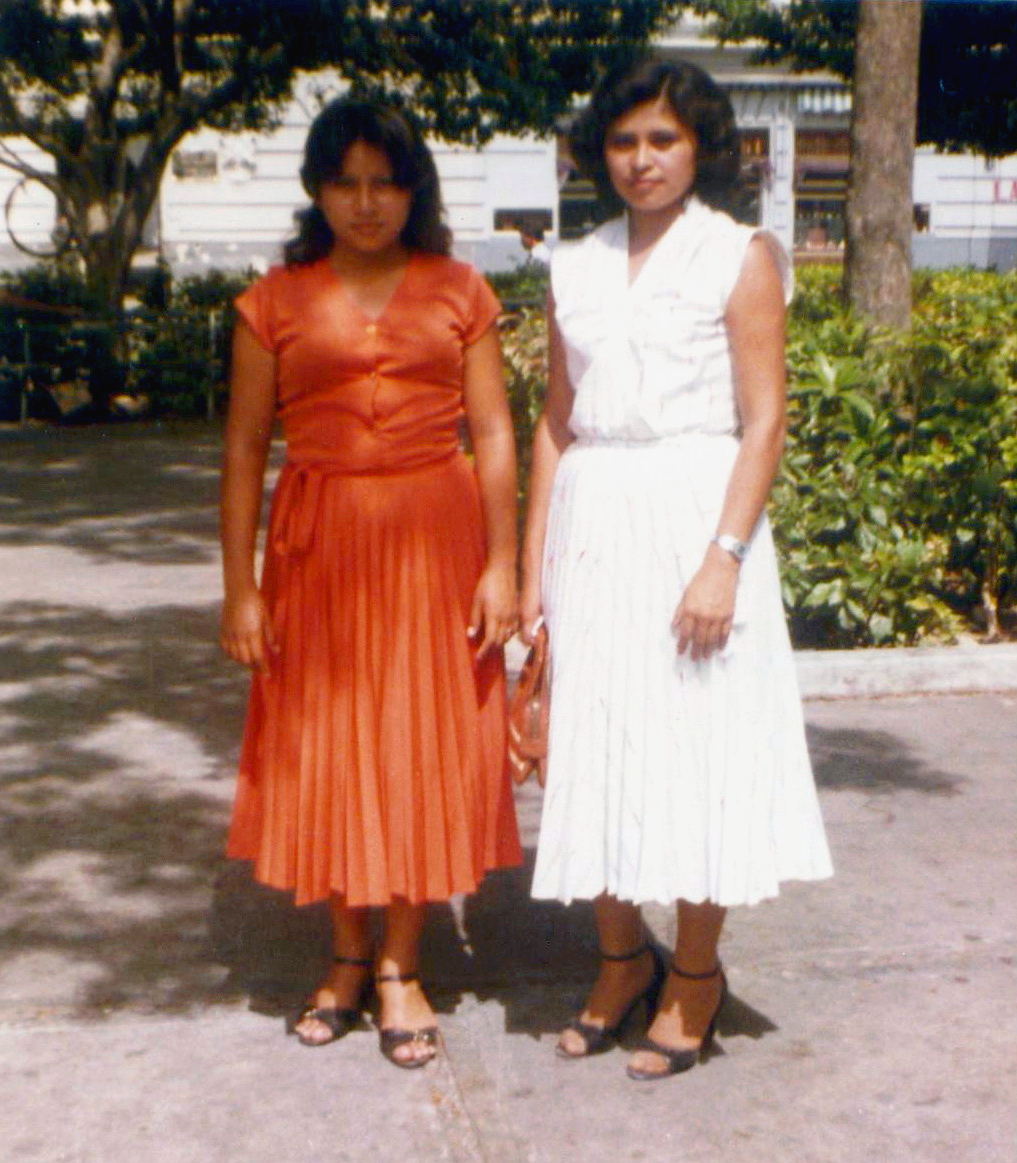
Mexican women, Mérida, Yucatán, Mexico in 1981.

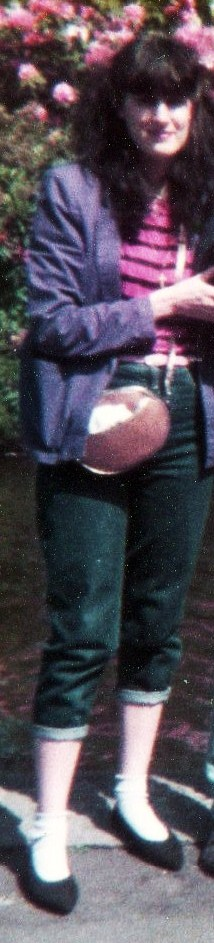
In 1983, pedal-pushers, in denim.

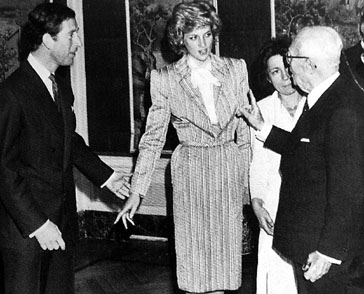
Princess Diana in 1985 wearing a dress with shoulder pads.

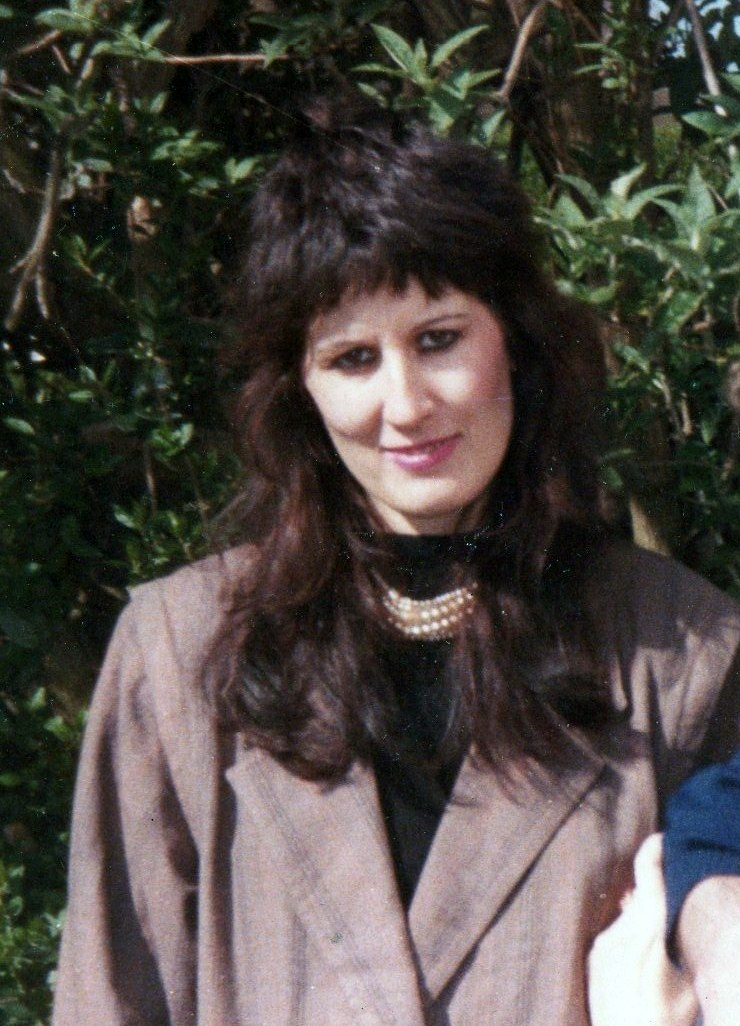
Young woman in Europe wearing a jacket with shoulder pads, 1985.

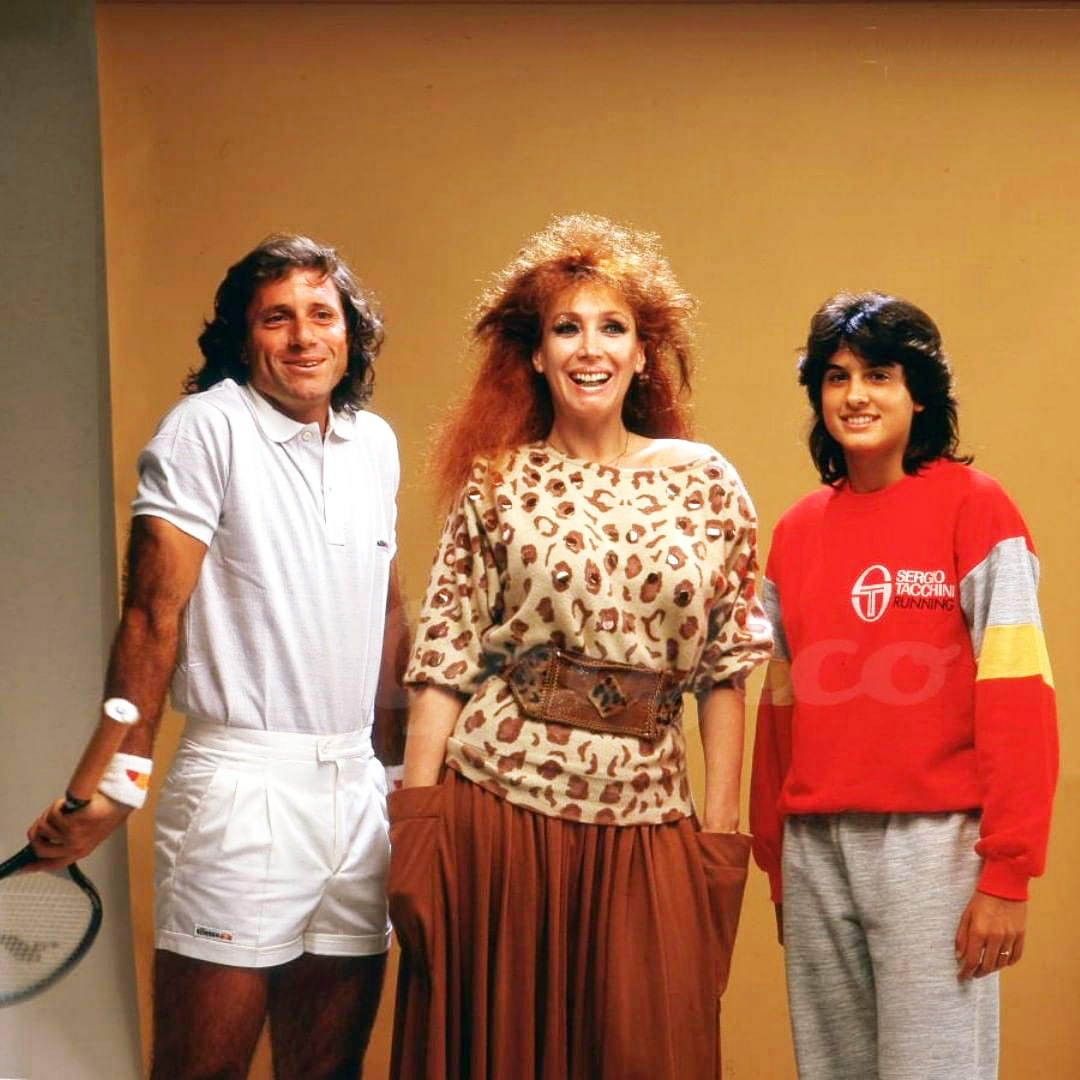
Guillermo Vilas, Moria Casán and Gabriela Sabatini in 1985.

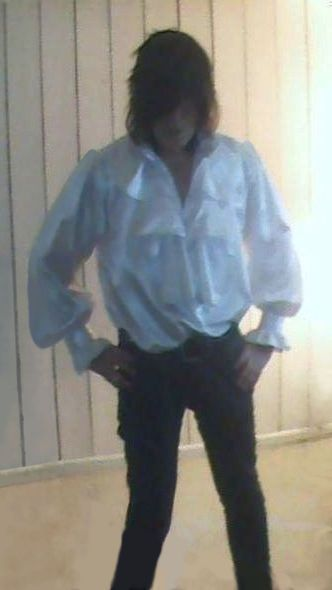
Young Englishman wearing a pirate shirt

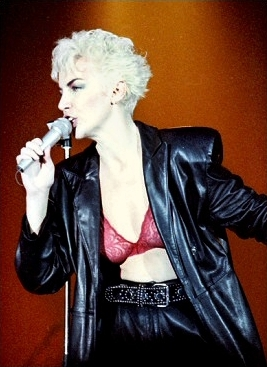
Scottish singer Annie Lennox of Eurythmics in 1986.

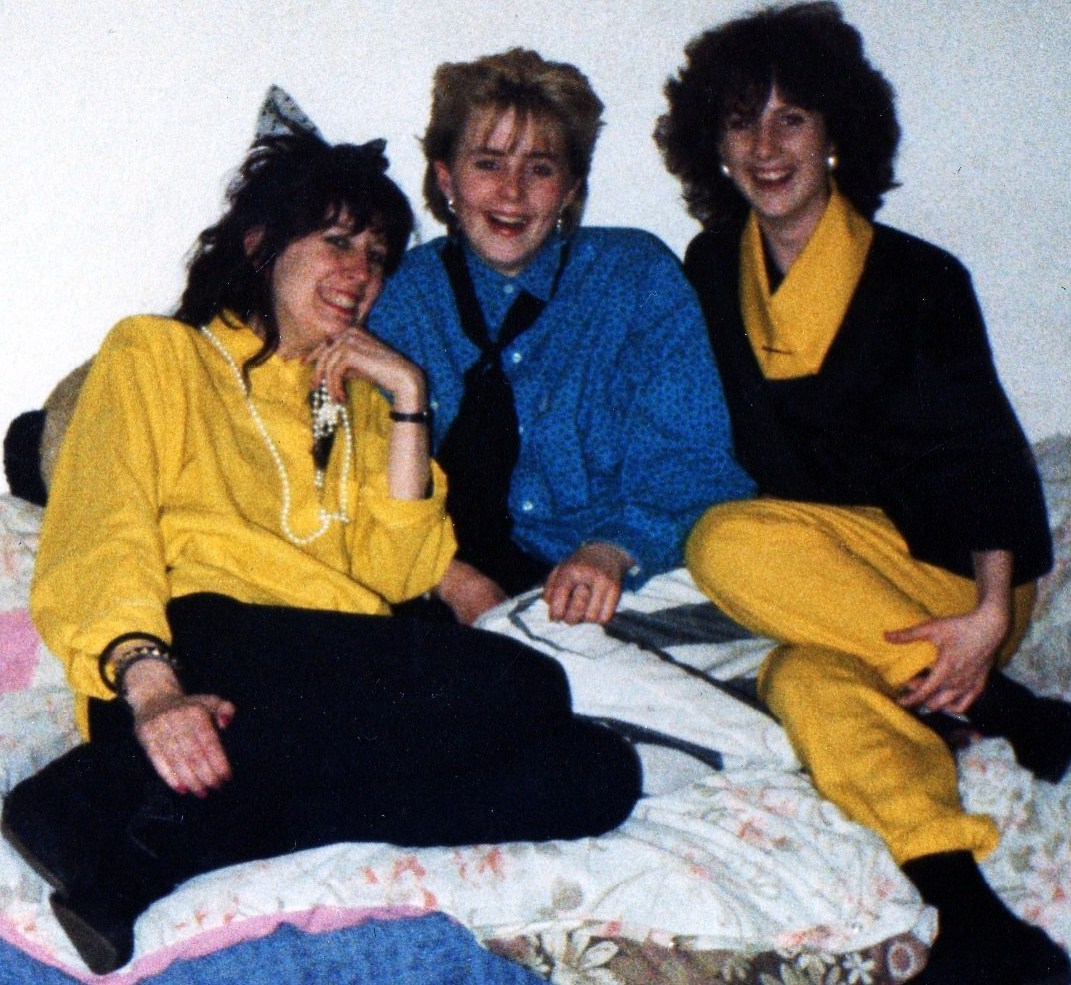
Irish girls in 1986.

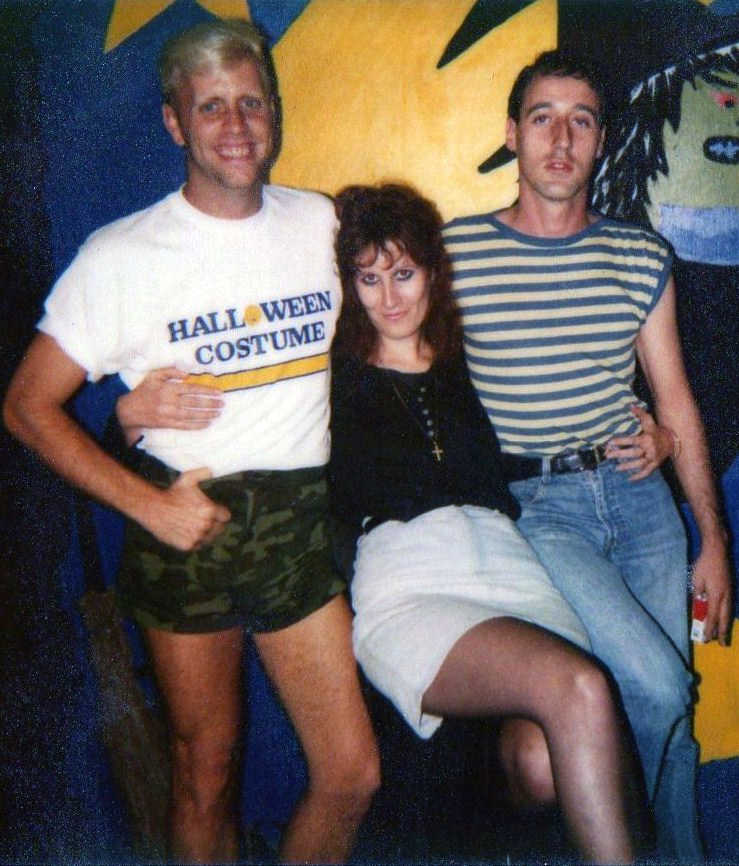
Group of friends in Italy in 1987.

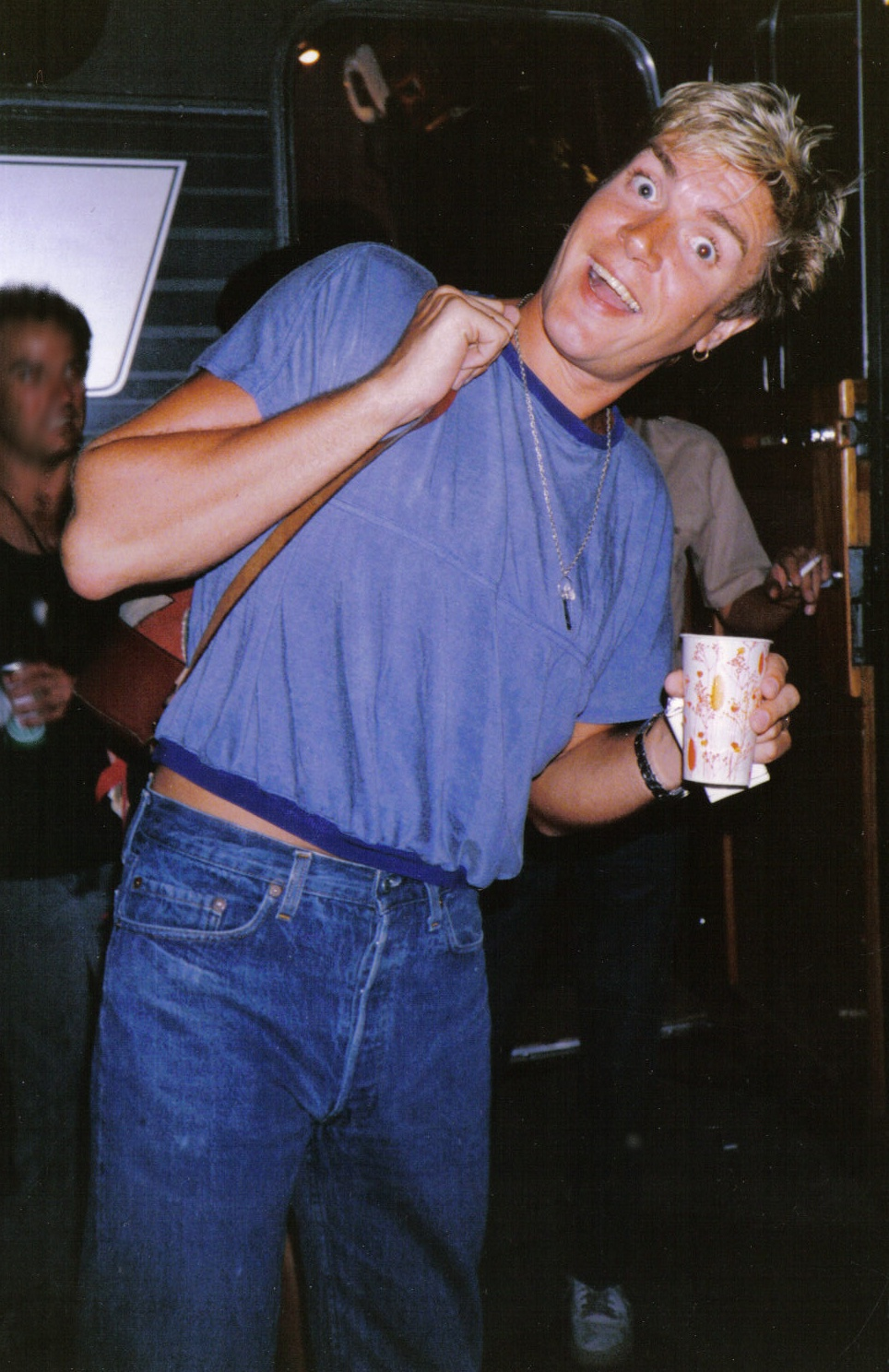
Simon Le Bon of Duran Duran in 1987.

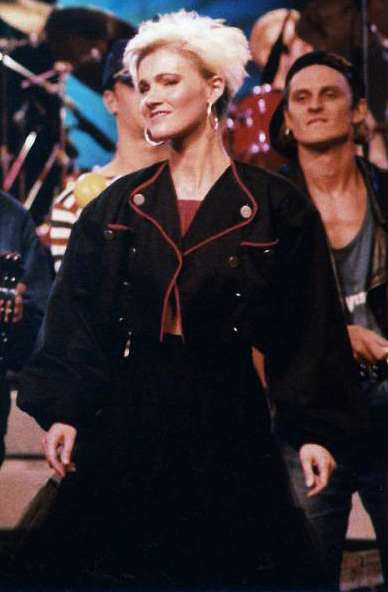
Swedish pop singer Marie Fredriksson in 1987.

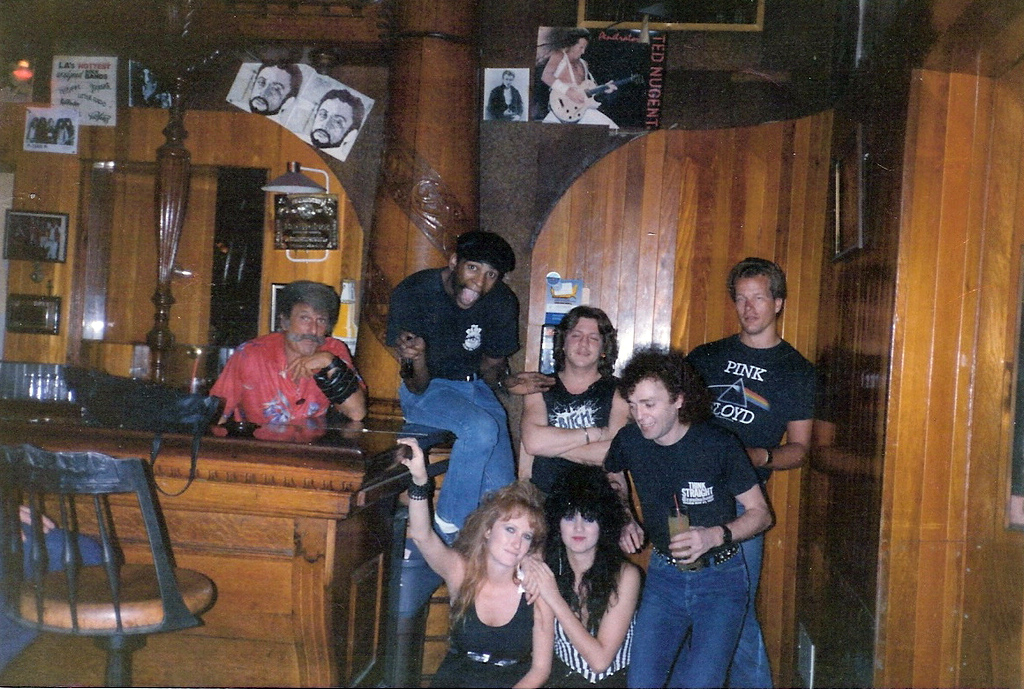
Photo taken at a Los Angeles club, 1987.

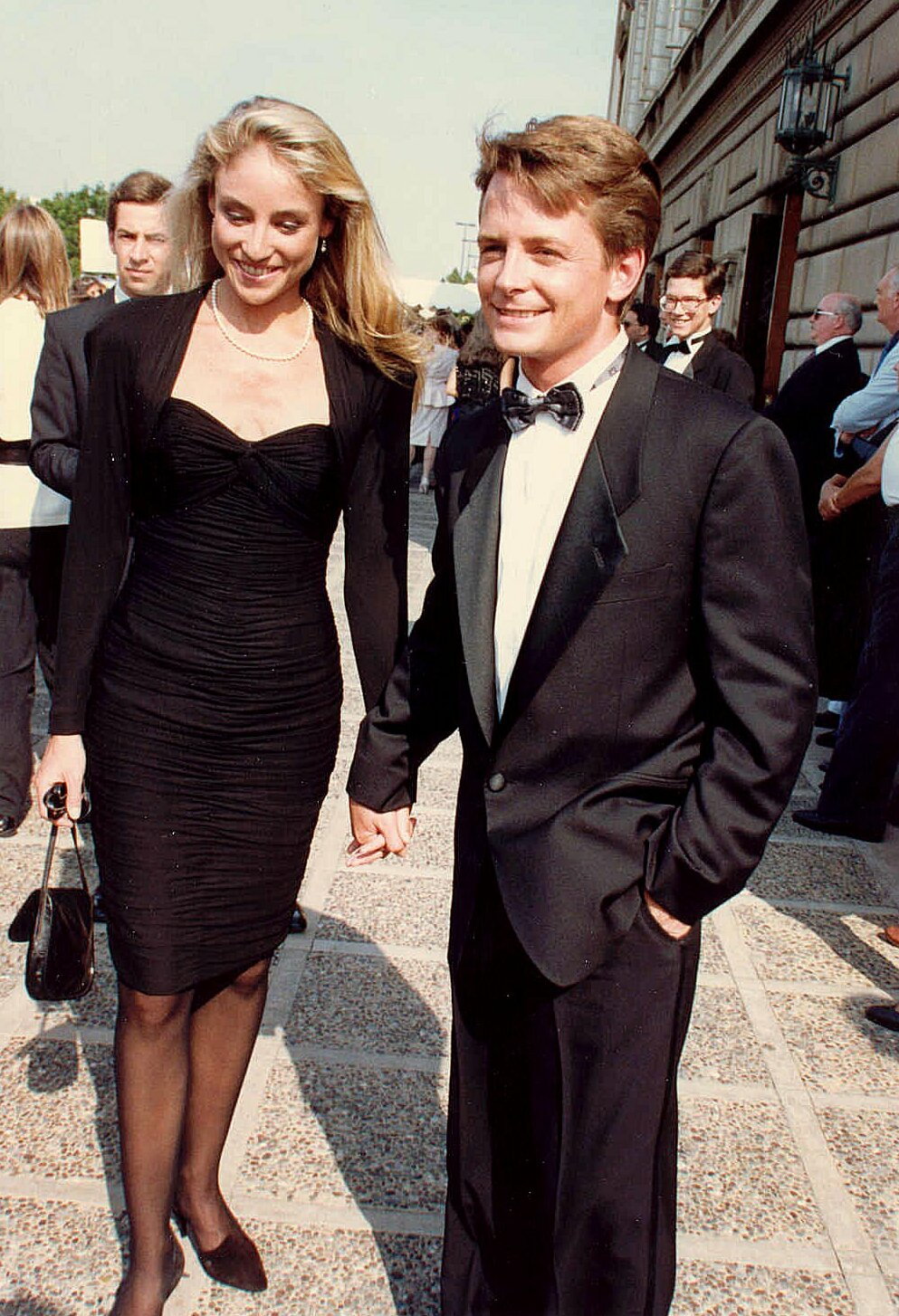
Michael J. Fox and Tracy Pollan in 1988.

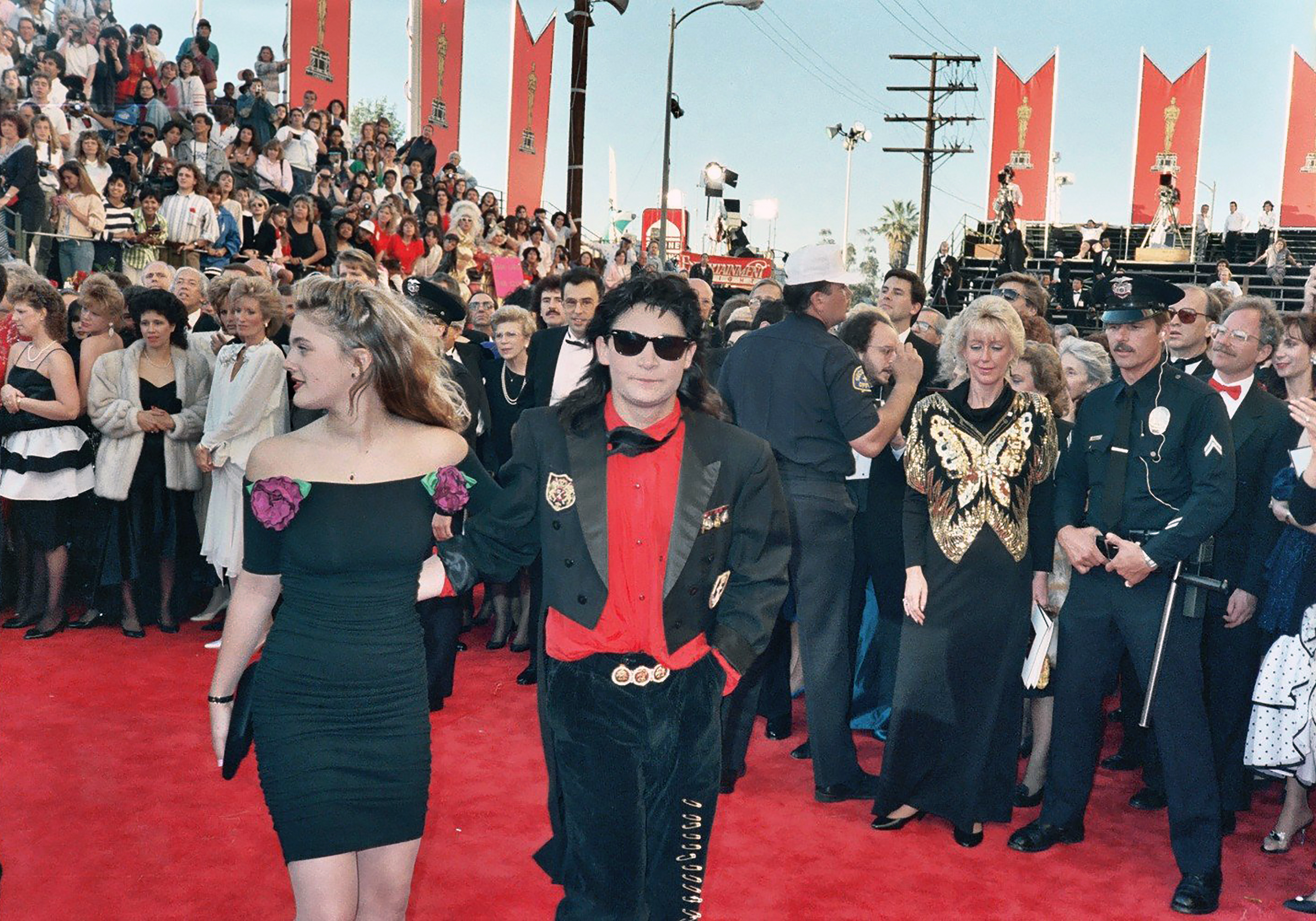
Drew Barrymore and Corey Feldman in 1989.
