= Fisherman pants =

Clothing item from Thailand

Thai fisherman pants (Thai: กางเกงเล, RTGS: kangkeng le, pronounced [kāːŋ.kēːŋ lēː]; Northern Thai: เตี่ยวสะดอ, pronounced [tìaw sā.dɔ̄ː]) are lightweight unisex trousers that are made wide in the waist so that one size fits all. The pants are wrapped around the waist and ribbons are tied to form a belt. Excess material is then folded over the knot.

Thai fisherman pants are very similar to the traditional attire of Intha and Shan males, the former of whom live on Inle Lake of Myanmar. They are known in Burmese as shan baung-mi (ရှမ်းဘောင်းဘီ).

== Uses ==
Although traditionally used by fishermen in Thailand, they have become popular among others for casual, beach, and exercise wear as well as for backpacking and pregnancy. Traditionally, Thai fisherman pants were adapted from sarongs and were worn by Thai fishermen and farmers. This style of pants suits the tropical climate of Thailand well as they are light and airy, inexpensive to produce, quick drying, secure, and comfortable.

Thai fishermen do in reality wear this style of pants. They are also increasingly common among many men and women of all nationalities. This style of trousers is usually made of cotton or rayon but is also now widely available in a variety of styles and fabrics, such as hemp, bamboo, or linen.

== Gallery ==
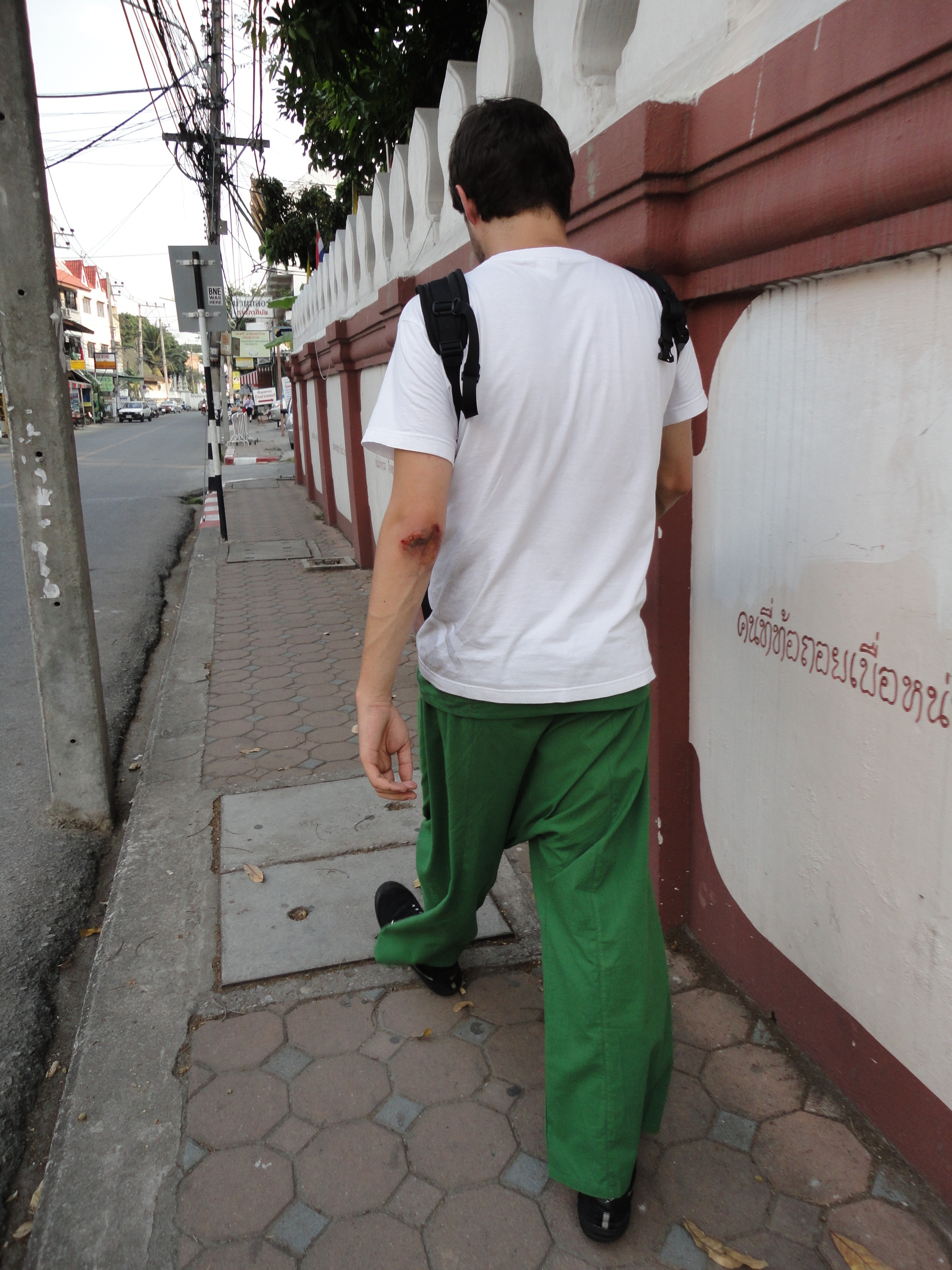
Tourist in Thailand wearing fisherman pants

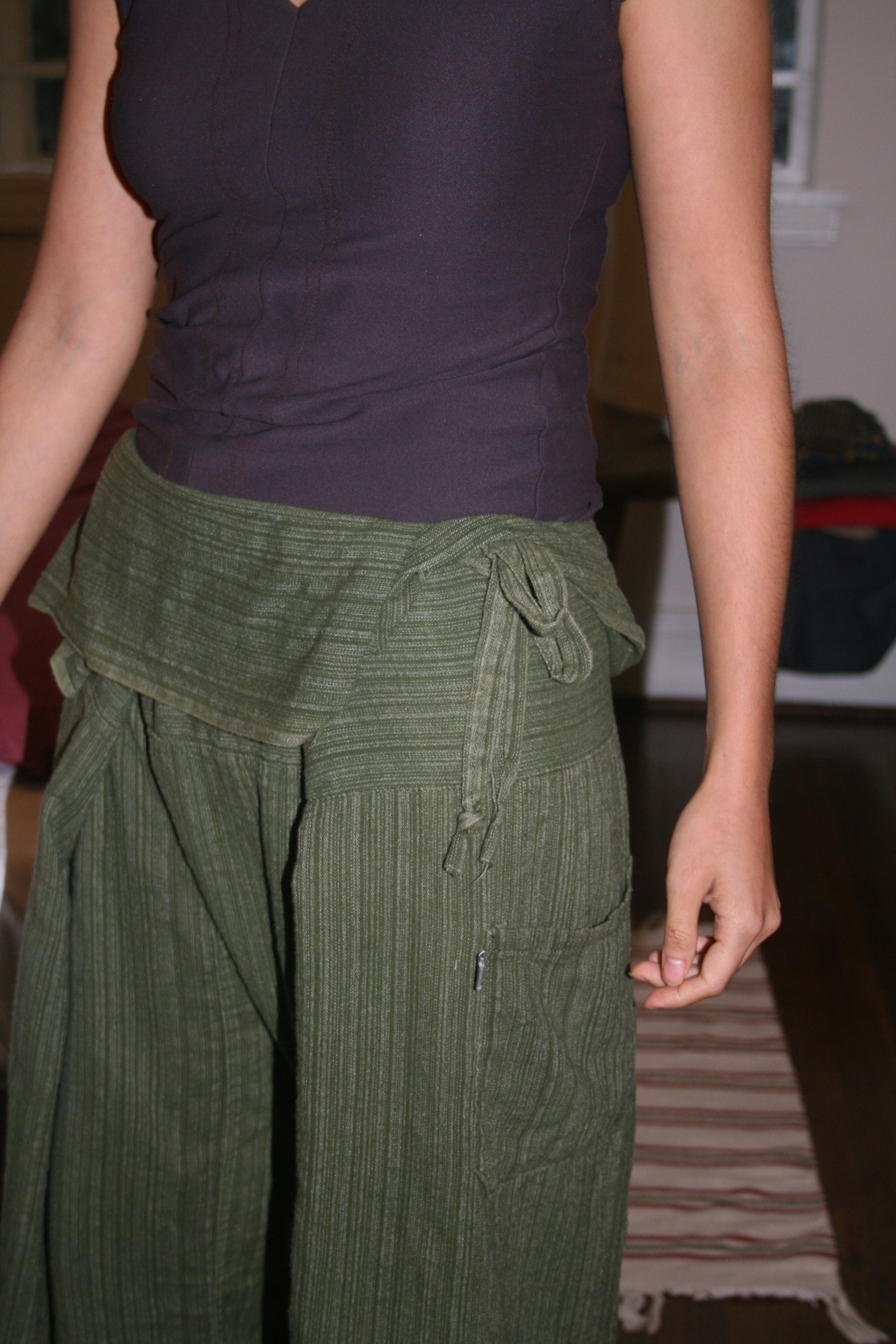
The waist of fisherman pants is often folded over

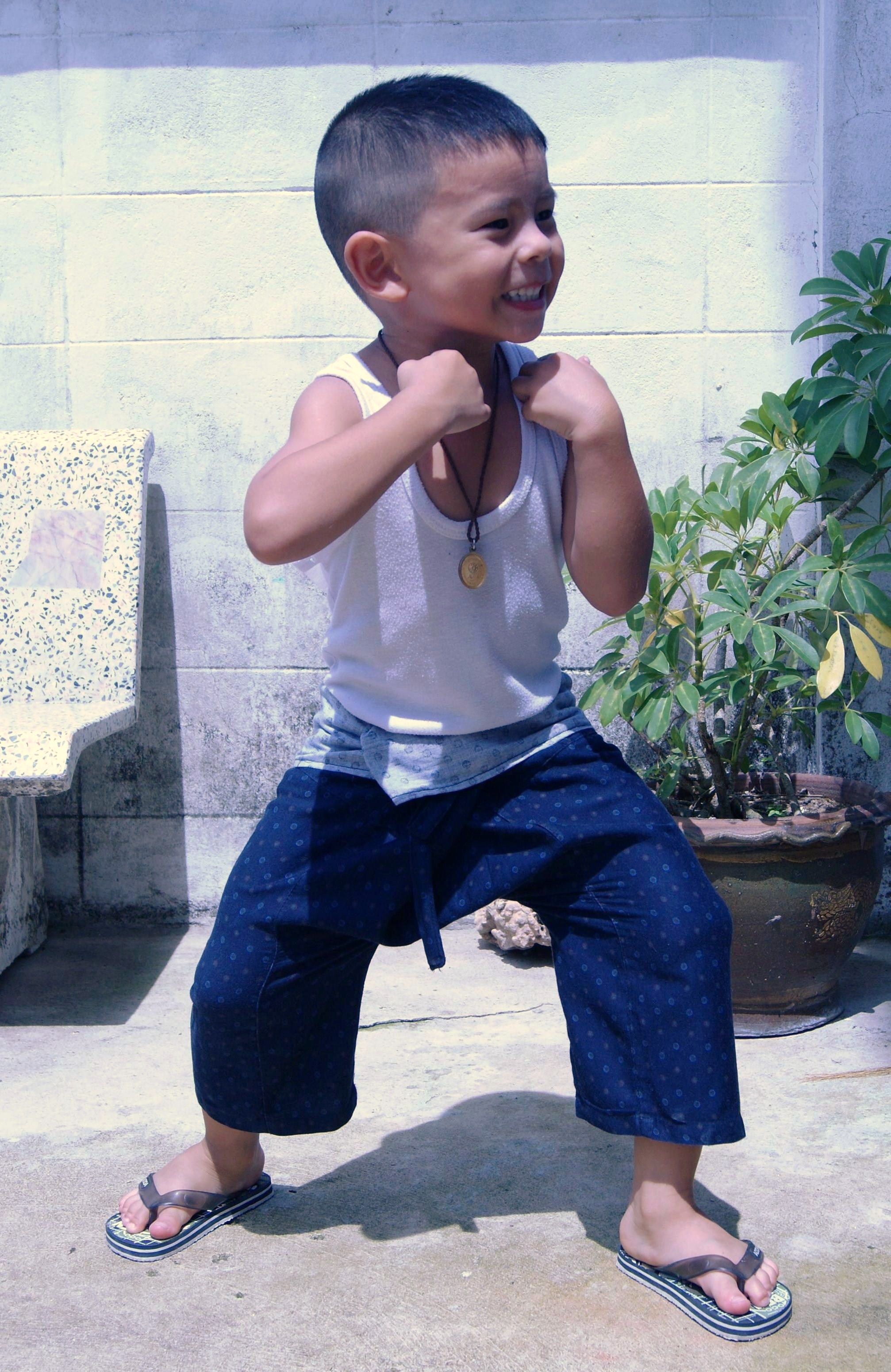
A Thai child wearing fisherman pants
