= The Bosstones =

American musical group

The Bosstones (also known as The Boss-Tones) were an American musical group who performed in the instrumentally-sparse, a cappella-based harmonic style known as Philadelphia doo-wop.

The Bosstones apparently released only one record in their history: "Mope-Itty Mope" b/w "Wings of an Angel" in 1959 on the Boss Records label. The record was a not a national or regional hit (although it did manage to scrape into the playlists of a few stations, such as KIMN in Denver in May of that year).

"Mope-Itty Mope" would probably have fallen into complete obscurity except for fact that Mexican border blaster XEAK decided to play it in 1961—in fact, they played it over and over for 72 straight hours, stunting its new format: "Extra News", the first 24-hour all-news station in Southern California (and one of the first in the United States).

In August, 1962, WGES 1390 in Chicago was sold and was renamed WYNR. Before WYNR went online on September 1, 1962, Mopt-itty Mope was played for a few days continuously with breaks only for fake commercials.

In 1962, The Dovells remade "Mope-itty Mope" as "The Mope-itty Mope Stomp".

In 1983, a ska punk band, calling themselves The Bosstones, was formed in Boston, Massachusetts. After finding out about the long-defunct group of the same name, the newer band changed its name to The Mighty Mighty Bosstones, at the suggestion of a bartender friend, in order to avoid any possible legal hassles.
