= Crolla =

1980s fashion brand

- Company type: Private company
- Traded as: Crolla
- Industry: Fashion
- Founded: London, England (1981)
- Founder: Scott Crolla, Georgina Godley
- Defunct: c1985
- Headquarters: London, England

Crolla was a 1980s British high fashion brand and boutique founded by Scott Crolla and Georgina Godley in Mayfair's Dover Street. Always niche, it was influential for its juxtaposition of unusual and vintage fabrics (often furnishing fabrics) and traditional tailoring. Describing the brand's signature at the time, Scott Crolla said: "My clothes are for someone who disregards fashion but enjoys fabrics… I would call it a calculated disregard for conventional taste." In the book London: After Fashion, Alistair O’Neill described the look as: “as odd a combination as Coward in Las Vegas, but it communicated a vision of Englishness just as brashly."

== History ==
The store's opening in 1981 coincided with the arrival of the New Romantic music/cultural movement. Crolla's use of lavish fabrics and textures on waistcoats, ties, jackets and trousers, including chintz, paisley and velvet, attracted fans including Boy George, Princess Diana and Isabella Blow. It was also the antithesis of the austere palette and sculptural lines of Japanese brands gaining in popularity at the time, such as Yohji Yamamoto and Comme des Garcons.

Initially, the company focused on menswear and, a year after the brand's launch, Ken Probst writing in The New York Times noted the renewed interest in British fashion created by the success of Brideshead Revisited and Chariots of Fire. Probst singled out Crolla as one of the most interesting of the new crop of men's fashion brands for its traditional cuts and unusual use of fabric, saying: "...its offerings include suits, jackets, shirts, pants, ties and even slippers – all cut in traditional, conservative styles but made out of a rich and diverse collection of fabrics. The unexpected exuberance of the recolored plaids, the hand-woven Indian cottons embroidered with silk and the fabrics from the 1940s and 1950s contrasts with the unchanging designs of the British ‘look', resulting in an innovative fusion of opposing styles."

Womenswear was added to the collection in 1984, a year before the partnership between Scott Crolla and Georgina Godley was dissolved. Their women's designs would enjoy international popularity and influence in 1984 and '85, with Crolla's large cabbage rose prints being copied across the fashion spectrum, from Jean-Paul Gaultier to Ralph Lauren to more affordable mass-market manufacturers in the United States.

== After Crolla ==
Godley moved on to design what she called "sport couture", using high-tech fabrics such as Gore-Tex and Lycra. Around this time, she also experimented with extreme padding of stomach and bottom for what she called her 'Lump and Bump' collection. This was a look that was later popularised by other designers, notably Comme des Garçons. Godley acted as an advisor for Paul Smith and Missoni, later working with interiors retailer Habitat and as a lecturer at Central Saint Martins.

Crolla won Bath Fashion Museum Dress of the Year in 1985 for a menswear outfit featuring a crushed shirt, velvet trousers and ikat mules. He designed for a short time for Callaghan. Later he moved into interior design with Lionel Bourcelot, launching a company called Ether. Early clients included Vivienne Tam.

== Legacy ==
Crolla was among the fashion labels featured in the V&A's 2013 retrospective of 1980s fashion and culture From Club to Catwalk. Both Godley and Crolla have items of clothing in the museum's permanent collection.

Crolla also featured among the earliest pieces in an exhibition about the life and wardrobe of Isabella Blow at Somerset House that ran from November 2013 – March 2014.

== External sources ==
- National Portrait Gallery image of Scott Crolla and Georgina Godley by Nick Knight, 1985. Part of Photographs Collection National Portrait Gallery
- The Look blog Peter Saville celebrates Crolla, 2008
