= Fashion in India =

India is a country with an ancient clothing design tradition, yet an emerging fashion industry. Though a handful of designers existed before the 1980s, the late 1980s and the 1990s saw a spurt of growth. This was the result of increasing exposure to global fashion and the economic boom of the economic liberalization of the Indian economy in 1990. The following decades firmly established fashion as an industry across India.

== History ==
=== Modern history ===
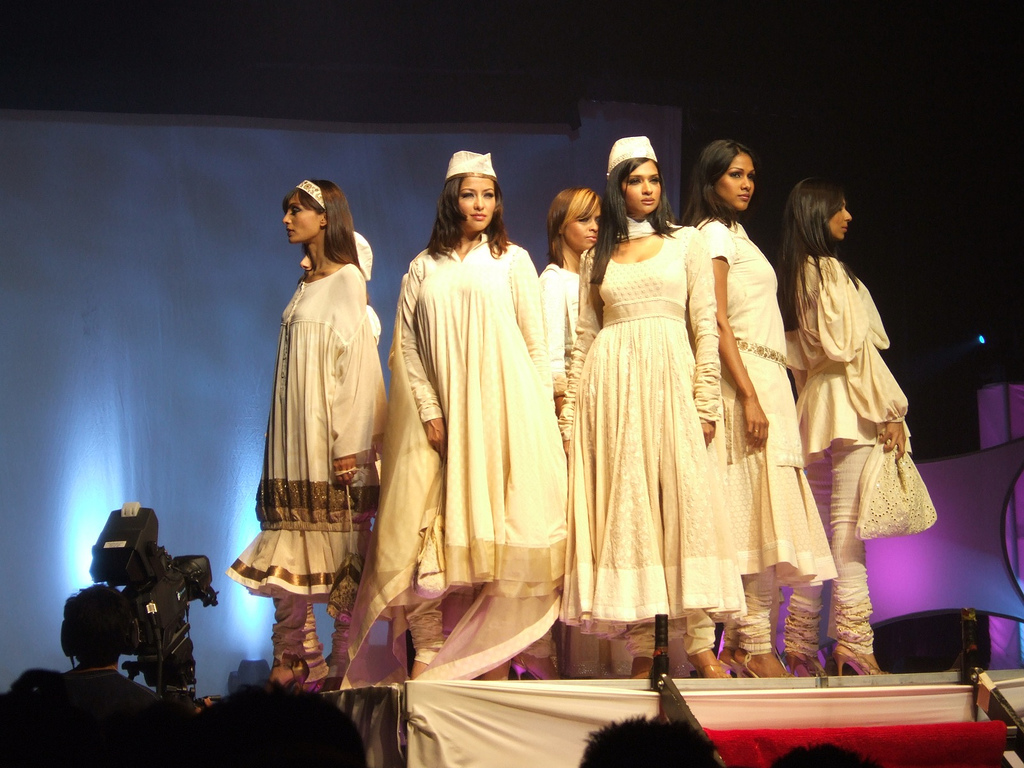
Post-independence focus on revival of traditional textile and design led to the rise of "ethnic chic".

The history of clothing in India dates back to ancient times, yet fashion is a new industry, as it was the traditional Indian clothing with regional variations, be it the sari, ghagra choli or dhoti, that remained popular until the early decades of post-independence India. Modern Indian fashion blends traditional Indian aesthetics with influences from Western fashion. Fashion includes a series of sequins and gold thread to attract customers and make a statement to the Indian fashion community. A famous Indian fashion trademark is embroidery, an art of sewing distinct thread patterns. A way to include the traditional look and create a new fashion statement includes embroidery applied to different dresses, skirts, shirts, and pants to reflect the western culture influence, as well as include the Indian tradition.

As part of a larger revival movement in the Indian textile industry, Ritu Kumar, a Kolkata-based designer and textile print-expert started working on reviving the traditional hand block printing techniques of Bengal, and making it a part of the fashion industry, established "ethnic chic". She opened her first boutique in Delhi in 1966. In 1973, she first showcased the Zardozi embroidery in her garments, which had its origins in the royal costumes dating back to the Mughal era. This led to the revival of this lost art. In time, embroidery became a prominent feature of Indian wedding attire, and also one of the country's biggest fashion exports. This was a period of revival, where various organisations, NGOs and individuals were involved in reviving traditional Indian techniques, in weaving, printing, dyeing or embroidery, including ikat, patola (double-ikat), bandhani (tie-dye) and shisha (mirror embroidery). Another noted contributor to India's couture revival is the designer duo Shyamal & Bhumika, based in Ahmedabad, known for blending traditional crafts with modern bridal and couture silhouettes.

An early trendsetter in fashion was Bollywood (Hindi cinema), where costume designers like Bhanu Athaiya started experimenting with film fashion in the 1960s. Athaiya started working on period costumes in Sahib Bibi Aur Ghulam (1962) and Amrapali (1966), though she went on to introduce varied trends through Teesri Manzil (1966), Chalte Chalte (1976), Karz (1980) and Chandni (1989). These were soon followed by the mass market. Also, situations and themes in Indian cinema became westernised, making way for the display of diverse fashion. Over the years, popular Bollywood trends have been the Madhubala's Anarkali-look with kurtas and churidars in Mughal-e-Azam (1960), purple embroidered sari worn by Madhuri Dixit in Hum Aapke Hain Koun...! (1994), to Rani Mukherji's short kurti-suits in Bunty Aur Babli (2005), and chiffon sarees and trench coats in Kabhi Alvida Naa Kehna (2006), Veer Zaara suits and blouses from Parineeta. This comes besides various fashion interpretations of the sari in films like Chandni (1989) with Sridevi, Main Hoon Na (2004) with Sushmita Sen and Dostana (2008) with Priyanka Chopra, which became fashion trends.

However, in recent decades, with increasing exposure to the West, its influence is no longer as strong as in previous decades. By the 2000s, with rise in the Indian diaspora around the world and the non-resident Indians, Bollywood continues to exert far greater influence on the fashion sensibilities amongst Indians around the world.

=== 1980s-1990s and fashion boom ===
By the early 1980s, the first generation of Indian fashion designers started cropping up, including Satya Paul. However, it was Rohit Khosla (1958–1994) who became a pioneer in the fashion industry when he co-founded Ensemble in 1987 with Tarun Tahiliani, Abu Jani-Sandeep Khosla and others. Though the "Anarkali-style" has been around ever since, it was first popularised after Mughal-e-Azam (1969). It was Abu Jani-Sandeep Khosla, who, inspired by costumes of Mughal courtesans and Meena Kumari's costumes in Pakeezah (1975), introduced the floor-length Anarkali-style of churidaar-kurta in 1988, which soon became the Indian version of the ball gown.

In 1986, the Ministry of Textiles, Government of India opened the National Institute of Fashion Technology (NIFT) in Delhi with the help of the Fashion Institute of Technology, New York. It played an important role in bringing in locally trained fashion designers. By 2010, it had developed 15 branches across India, and smaller private fashion institutions had also developed. Also in 1987, Tarun Tahiliani and his wife Shailja 'Sal' Tahiliani, founded Ensemble, India's first multi-designer boutique in Mumbai.

In 1990, economic liberalisation of the Indian economy took place, which also propelled the fashion industry. In the following decade, the fashion industry experienced a boom, both in terms of volume and trends. Designer Suneet Varma, inspired by his corsetry- reigning in France, introduced an Indo-Western, metal breast plate, followed by the "corset blouse" in 1992, made with satin, polyester taffeta or stretch lace. It was designed to replace the traditional choli, or Indian blouse, worn with a sari. In its early years, the 1980s, Indian design largely focused on haute couture; however, in the next decade, India saw a growth in the domestic retail industry, as well as an influx of outsourced garment business from the western countries. This meant better quality and larger manufacturing facilities available locally. Together, these reasons spurred many Indian designers to start their prêt-à-porter (ready-to-wear) lines.

"God-printed T-shirts" were introduced by Manish Arora in 1997, along with Indian kitsch and street art in saturated colours on fashionwear. Another important reinvention was made in 1998 by Monisha Jaisingh, who shortened the traditional kurta to develop the Kurti, which became popular worldwide as the "Indian embroidered tunic". Also in the same year, the Fashion Design Council of India was established, which later started the India Fashion Week in Delhi, to promote Indian designers and manufacturers. In 2000, another Bollywood costume designer, Manish Malhotra, became an important influence on Indian fashion. Having designed the trendy looks for actresses Urmila Matondkar in Rangeela (1995) and Karisma Kapoor in Raja Hindustani (1996), he introduced the "cocktail sari" in 2000. Using pastel colours and fabrics like chiffon, satin or net, it revived the traditional sari in a modern avatar. He was, in turn, inspired by the popular Bollywood saris of the 1960s and the chiffon saris worn by the actress in Yash Chopra films, like Chandni (1989). This also started another era of Bollywood fashion influence and its collaboration with leading designers, besides leading actors and actresses occasionally walking the ramp for some designers.

By 2009, the Indian fashion industry, despite the ongoing recession, was worth ₹2.9 billion (US$31 million). Also in the same year, Manish Arora, known for his quirky-kitsch, became the first Indian designer to participate in Paris Fashion Week.

=== 2010 onwards – change in Indian Menswear fashion ===
Lakme Fashion Week's Gen programme has provided a launch platform for emerging and avant-garde designers in India, including Antar Agni, Ajay Kumar and Bloni. Kumar is known for using colourful prints and print-on-print combinations in menswear, which have been worn by actors including Ranveer Singh, Shahid Kapoor. Similarly, the label Antar Agni introduced draped menswear incorporating unconventional silhouettes.

== Cities ==
Delhi, Kolkata, Mumbai and Chennai are important centres of fashion designing and manufacturing in India, followed by Bangalore, Hyderabad, Pune and other large cities. Mumbai and Bangalore are home to some of the top fashion rental services in India.

== Fashion weeks ==
- Vivz World Fashion Week (Pune)
- India Fashion Week (Delhi)
- Lakme Fashion Week (Mumbai)
- Indian Federation for Fashion Development's India Runway Week (Delhi)
- Bangalore Fashion Week
- Mysore Fashion Week
- India Kids Fashion Week

== Fashion exhibitions ==
- Hi Life Fashion Exhibitions

== Noted fashion designers ==
- List of fashion designers in India

== In popular culture ==
The Indian fashion industry was the theme of the 2008 Hindi film, Fashion, written and directed by Madhur Bhandarkar, starring Priyanka Chopra and Kangana Ranaut as the leads.

== Academic research on Indian fashion ==
The Indian fashion industry as such remains academically understudied, even though there is research available on textiles, craft traditions and the history of Indian dress. The only anthropological study of the Indian fashion industry, based on ethnographic research in Northern India, specifically New Delhi and Lucknow and dealing with both the worlds of luxury fashion designers and the worlds of craftspeople and workers in the industry, is Tereza Kuldova's work Luxury Indian Fashion: A Social Critique, published by Bloomsbury in 2016.

== See also ==
- Clothing in India
- History of fashion design
- Indo-Western clothing
- Paambadam
- 1960s in Indian fashion
- 1970s in Indian fashion
- 1980s in Indian fashion
- 1990s in Indian fashion
- 2000s in Indian fashion
- 2010s in Indian fashion

== Bibliography ==
- Ramesh Prasad Mohapatra (1992). Fashion Styles of Ancient India: A Study of Kalinga from Earliest Times to Sixteenth Century AD. B.R. Publishing Corporation. ISBN 978-81-7018-723-3.
- Subodh Kapoor (2002). The Indian Encyclopaedia. Cosmo Publications. pp. 2316–. ISBN 978-81-7755-257-7.
- Federico Rocca (2009). Contemporary Indian Fashion. Distributed Art Pub Incorporated. ISBN 978-88-6208-100-9.
- Michael Boroian; Alix de Poix (2009). India by Design: The Pursuit of Luxury and Fashion. John Wiley & Sons. ISBN 978-0-470-82396-5.
- Linda Welters; Abby Lillethun (2011). The Fashion Reader: Second Edition. Berg. ISBN 978-1-84788-590-6.
- Kuldova, Tereza (2013). Fashion India: Spectacular Capitalism. Oslo: Akademika Publishing. ISBN 9788232103195.
- Chandra, M., Gupta, S. P., In Dikshit, K. N., In Dwivedi, V. P., & In Asthana, S. (1973). Costumes, textiles, cosmetics & coiffure in ancient and mediaeval India. Delhi: Oriental Publishers on behalf of the Indian Archaeological Society.
