= Rajesh Pratap Singh =

Indian fashion designer (born 1969)

Rajesh Pratap Singh (born 1969) is an Indian fashion designer based in New Delhi.

Singh was originally from Rajasthan. He graduated from NIFT in 1994; before graduating, he was working with New Delhi–based designer David Abraham. He further went to work with the Italian menswear label Marzotto for two years. Singh started his own line of men's and women's clothing in 1997 after his experience of twelve years in the fashion industry in India and Italy. The designer is known for his minimalism and understated design aesthetics with a sharp eye for detailings. Pratap's exploration with fabric texturing and most prominently his creative usage of pin tucks has almost become synonymous to the label. The key to his work lies in simplicity, clean cuts and flawless detailings. The designer's belief in silence is reflected in the name of his pret line RIP (Rest in Peace). Pratap has showcased in collections in Paris and Milan as well apart from India He is also the Associate Design member of Fashion Design Council of India (FDCI).

== Personal life ==
Singh comes from the family of doctors from Rajasthan. His father, being a cardiologist, expected him to take up medicine. However, Pratap was inclined towards his cousin profession who was a costume assistant on a BBC production set in India. The designer is often termed to be a recluse and a media-shy person as he believes that people should associate themselves with his work instead of his name. His wife Payal works alongside him.

Pratap is a rock climber and a regular biker and remarked in an interview that he is attracted to the machine as it is an engineered product with a certain precision that gives him a sense of the carefree. The designer also feels that travelling helps in evolving creativity.

== Career ==
In 2006, Pratap's spring summer collection at the Wills Lifestyle India Fashion Week (WIFW) was widely appreciated, bringing him into the spotlight of the year's fashion event. The designer's summer collection instead of revolving around the colour white had fluorescent line of limes and yellows combined with rich reds. Maintaining his signature style of pin tucks, the collection also played with the concepts of yokes, ribs and sequins. The most striking feature of the range was the unusual individuality of each garment although they were worked in and around the same concept.

In 2007, Wills Lifestyle introduced the Wills Lifestyle India Fashion Week line by Rajesh Pratap Singh for which the designer created the range of menswear and womenswear with his signature minimal styling. Products offered in the line included shirts, jackets, popovers etc. for men and shirt dresses, tunics, shirts and evening gowns etc. for women. The range was designed to suit formal as well informal occasions.

In 2008, Rajesh showcased spring summer 2009 collection at Paris Fashion Week which was positively received. The focus of the collection was the play of fabrics such as cotton and organza. The designer also experimented with the colour palette by using bright hues such as fuchsias and corals. With wearable, clean and structured cuts, the products were well appreciated.

In the same year, Pratap showcased is autumn winter line in the WIFW titled Valentino Rossi meets Mother Teresa, Biker's Jacket meet the Saree depicting glimpses of India to the West in a completely new manner. Black dominated the pallette with an underplay of electric blues, magentas and reds. The range showcased varied amalgamation of silhouettes such as one-piece dresses in textured leathers, dhoti pants, double-breasted and angrakha-jackets, and short jerseys paired with churidar-pants, as well as long skirts embellished with silver patterns. The collection came out to be an interesting combination of tough biker look and soft Indian elegance.

In 2010, the designer took the theme of Bespoke Tales projecting the progression of the art of tailoring as seen by the tailor. Showcasing the grand finale autumn winter collection at the Wills Lifestyle India Fashion Week titled Us and Them depicting the perception of the fashion industry by the non-industry people. The key highlight of the collection was the utilitarian significance such as the wide use of double cloth which could be worn inside out, the concept of reversible garment and the use of unwoven fabrics. The colour pallette had the dominance of black, red and blue with products ranging from dresses, jackets and trenchcoats to name a few.

Singh also showcased his collection at the Van Heusen India Men's Week (VHIMW) in the same year. The collection was quite unconventional with Rock N Roll imprints on it.

In the same year, Rajesh along with stylist Ambika Pillai worked on the look of the cabin crew of IndiGo. He designed the bi-coloured clean-cut tunic and a hat with the airline's wings displayed on it.

In 2011, the designer showcased his spring summer collection in WIFW which was the amalgamation between Ikkat weave from the state of Orissa and handloom textiles. The colours had vibrant shades of fuchsias and oranges with clean cut tunics, shirt dresses and hooded shirts and jackets to name a few. Designer Rakesh Thakore, Rohit Bal, Rita Kapur Chisti and model and actor Rahul Dev walked the ramp clad in the designer's collection.

In the same year, the designer associated with TATA Motors in the design project of TATA Manza where he gave his inputs in the design and the interior of the model.

In 2011, the designer's autumn winter collection at WIFW, named as Architectural Romance became laborious was quite experimental. Black and white dominated the pallette of the range with bubble silhouettes and anti-fits. The range had elements such as floral embroideries, leather and felt appliques, pixelated leather sequins and some fine textiles termed as the Aluminium Ikkat by the designer himself.

Pratap, in 2011, also presented his collection at the grand finale of Dubai Fashion Week. The collection had the dominance of Black with the print hues appearing in the floral motifs. The range reflected his use of de-structured cuts and sleek finishing with offerings like ankle-length velvet coats and the cocoon-inspired dresses with dropped shoulders and tapering hemlines. The striking feature of the range was the metal Ikkat pattern, geometrical prints of hexagonal shapes featured heavily in the 41 creations.

Rajesh Pratap Singh has a domestic retail presence of six standalone flagship stores across the country and selected multibrand boutiques. Internationally the label retails through some select boutiques.

== Philanthropy and craft revival initiatives ==
In 2009, the designer showcased his ecologically responsible collection at the "Green Fashion Show" on Earth Day organised by National Geographic Channel in partnership with the British Council and Madi Design. The designer came up with the collection of hand woven and hand spun special organic cotton and other eco-friendly material.

Pratap is closely working with backward and forward integration as well as technical improvements in Khadi (handspun and handwoven fine cotton and wool). He is also working with a cooperative society for developing India's finest Cashmere.

The designer is also working on the state government sponsored project to promote and popularise Orissa handlooms and textiles in India and abroad by improving designs and create a market for the same.

In 2012, Pratap was one of the twelve designers who showcased for a special show against human traffic in WIFW joining hands with an organisation, you can free us, which rescues women from forced prostitution founded by NRI philanthropist Sujo John. The show began with a story of one such woman, Alice, who was rescued from a brothel in New Delhi, rehabilitated and then featured in a fashion shoot titled as Alice in Wonderland photographed by Subi Samuel. Singh's ensemble depicted hope with a strong black and orange churidar frock ensemble.

== Awards ==
The designer has won many awards –

- Designer of the Year at the GQ Men of the Year awards in 2009
- Designer of the Year named by Elle in 2007
- Kingfisher Designer of the Year award in 2001 and 2005
- Best Menswear Designer honour at the Fashion Awards 1996
