= Suhani Pittie =

Indian jewelry designer

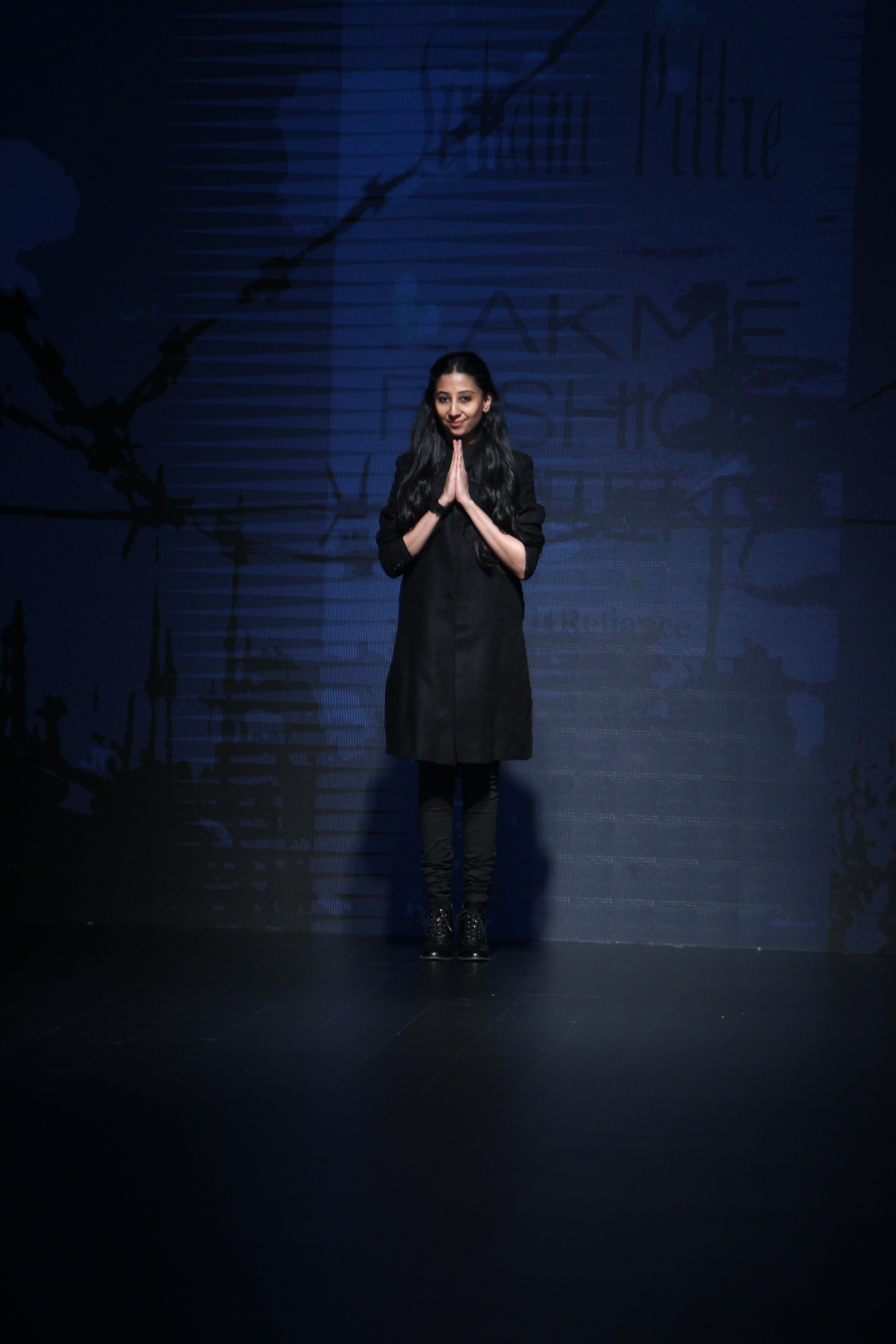
- Born: 14 April 1981 (age 45)
- Education: Gemological Institute of America, USA
- Occupations: Gemologist and Jewellery Designer
- Years active: 1998–present
- Notable work: Grunge Begum (2010), Urban Folk (2011), Child of Eden (2012), Dances of Earth (2013), Nowhere People (2016)
- Relatives: Anamika Khanna

Suhani Pittie (born 14 April 1981) is an Indian jewellery designer based in Hyderabad, India. She launched her own jewellery label, Suhani Pittie label in 2004. The World Gold Council has enlisted Pittie as one of the top 10 most inventive and ingenious jewellery designers in the world.

== Early life ==
Born in Calcutta, India to a traditional business family, Suhani studied gemology at the Gemological Institute of America in Carlsbad, USA. One of three sisters, she is the youngest. At age 20, Suhani established her own training institute, teaching grading of diamonds and coloured stones. Her work earned her the SinGem Award for Excellence in the field of gemology.

== Career ==
In 2004, Suhani move to Hyderabad, participated in the exhibitions, where her collection was ordered by the fashion stores of India. She was the first Indian jewellery designer to be selected to showcase at the Miami Fashion Week; subsequently she received an order from the Museum of Arts and Design, New York. Her design collections were also shown at the India Fashion Week, Lakme Fashion Week and other shows. Her jewellery has been worn by many celebrities. Actress Sonam Kapoor has been regularly seen wearing her work at the Cannes Film Festival from 2013.

In 2009 Suhani was short-listed for the Young Fashion Entrepreneur Award held by the British Council. As a finalist she showcased her collections to Prince Charles, Camilla, Duchess of Cornwall, Prince Edward and Gaj Singh at the Balsamand Lake Palace in Jodhpur.

In 2011 the Indian Express daily newspaper invited her as a speaker at the prestigious World Crafts Council in New Delhi.

In 2017, N4M Reviews, adjudged Suhani as No 1 among the Top Most Famous and Best Jewellery Designers In India. In an exclusive interview to N4M, she cited how she heated an old piece of silver, drilled a hole in it, bent it into an offbeat shape and made it into a necklace. This was the first piece she made and claimed to her credit.

Suhani was also selected to co-operate with veteran artist Thota Vaikuntam to convert his miniature paintings into jewellery. She worked with fashion designer Anamika Khanna as the designer for accessories. Swarovski commissioned her to create exclusive designs for them, as a part of their 10th Anniversary celebrations in India.

The Femina magazine named Suhani as one of the "35 most powerful women in India, under 35". The Fortune magazine included her in the list of 5 people to watch out for in India.. She was also enlisted as one of the youngest Youth Icons of Andhra Pradesh by Passionate Foundation. The American travel and lifestyle channel TLC chose to feature her work and invited as a co-host with Lisa Ray for their Oh My Gold show (the Hyderabad episode).

Suhani is also a columnist of Deccan Chronicle and The Telegraph, she writes on fashion and jewellery. The ace designer made it to the top six finalists at the Satya Brahma founded Indian Affairs India Leadership Conclave 2016 edition annual awards in the category of Indian Affairs Jewellery Designer of Innovations Creativity. She is also a member of Fashion Design Council of India.

== Suhani Pittie label ==
Suhani Pittie is known for contemporary jewellery and comments on her collections:

"My first collection, Grunge Begum was a story of the Nizam (of Hyderabad). There were copper coins and beryls and the whole regal perspective to it. Move next to Free Religion, it was truly free spirited like the gypsies and the jatra dancers who meander and move with their surroundings and become one with it. There was copper, steel, cheed (beads). It was very free spirited much like their culture. Urban folk was an urban kaleidoscope. It reflected the much modern perspectives in relation to the very earthy Rajasthani culture. Child of Eden, was about going back in time where you were in love with everything. But that too is expressed in the form of an Indian garden. There are peacocks and swans. My latest collection, Dances with the Earth is a collection inspired by the raw ancient beauty that celebrates a particular form of paganism seen amongst tribes of centuries gone by. Using copper, one of the first metals used by humans, this collection is dedicated to the spirit of the tribals living in tune with Nature. I am very one with what I see around me. It influences me."

The Suhani Pittie label retails from stores across India and abroad, including its flagship store at Hyderabad and online store.

== Awards ==
- 2012: Young Women Achievers award by the FICCI Ladies Organisation
- 2012: Audi Ritz Icon award by Audi and Ritz Magazine
