= Anamika Khanna =

Indian fashion designer (born 1971)

- Born: 19 July 1971 (age 55)
- Occupation: Fashion designer
- Labels: Anamika Khanna; Ana-mika

Anamika Khanna (born 19 July 1971) is an Indian fashion designer from Kolkata. She is the first Indian designer to have an International label: "Ana Mika".

Before entering the fashion industry, Anamika was a classical dancer and painter.

== Career ==
Khanna's career started in the year 1998. In 2003, she was invited to Pakistan to show her bridal collections as a part of Bridal Asia. In 2004, she launched her international label: Ana Mika, and showcased her collections at the Lakme Fashion Week's Grand Finale. In 2005, she displayed her collection "The Botanist" at the Will's Fashion Wee Spring/Summer edition, and took part in the London Fashion Week. She got exclusive contracts from British department store Harrods and was covered by the magazines: Glamour (Paris), Vogue (October 2005 edition in UK) and Vogue Best Buy.

In 2007, she participated at the Paris Fashion Week along with Manish Arora and in 2008 in the HDIL India Couture Week, presenting her signature cowl-shaped dresses that closely resembled the dhoti worn by Mahatma Gandhi. Sonam Kapoor walked the ramp for the first time and she was wearing a golden cowl-shaped gown embellished with zardosi with a top adorned with Mukesh work. She also participated in the Will's Lifestyle Fashion Week Grand Finale Autumn/Winter edition.

In 2009, she became the finale designer at the Lakme Fashion Week (LFW) Fall/Winter edition. In 2010, she took part in The India Premier London Fashion Week's Autumn/Winter collection. In 2011, she showcased her creations at the Lakme Summer Resort. In 2012, at the Delhi Couture Week she showcased her signature dhoti-pants together with sari drapes and floor-length jackets. In 2013, at the PCJ Delhi Couture Week, her collection had shararas, capes, gilets, vests and coats with a color combination of black, white and gold. Tribal jewellery designed by Suhani Pittie, Anamika's sister, was also a part of the collection.

Khanna showcased her collection at Bvlgari’s India launch in 2014. She is also associated with Bvlgari Singapore. She also introduced a number of trends in adorning oneself at the Lakme Fashion Week Summer, 2015. Some examples include lip colours like dark burgundy and geometric shapes in the form of golden leaves starting from the temples and ending at the inner side of the cheekbones. In 2016, for her show at India Couture Week she associated with Amrapali Jewellers, Jaipur to debut her jewellery collection. The line-up included everything from traditional naths to timeless polki.

=== Celebrity associations ===
Sonam Kapoor was seen wearing Khanna's creations at various red carpet events, including Cannes red-carpet gala in 2013, Cannes 2014 and Cannes 2016. Kareena Kapoor had worn Khanna's creation at Lakme Fashion Week 2015 and at various red carpet events. Kapoor's sister, Karishma was also seen donning Khanna's label. Jacqueline Fernandez was seen on the red carpet at Jio MAMI 18th Mumbai Film Festival. Mira Rajput chose to wear Anamika Khanna lehenga at her wedding, she chose not just one but four outfits from the designer at her wedding.

Sonakshi Sinha has worn designs by Anamika, including a notable appearance at the IIFA Awards in a lungi-style skirt paired with a short embellished jacket. Getting together for an event with Madhuri Dixit, Deepika Padukone looked suave beyond words in an Anamika Khanna off-white netted saree with a long cape jacket.

Deepika Padukone wore an Anamika Khanna saree at the Time 100 Gala in New York in 2018. Shilpa Shetty, Sridevi, Madhuri Dixit, Alia Bhatt and Shraddha Kapoor have at least once graced an event in an Anamika Khanna's ensemble. Singer Kanika Kapoor recently hosted a Diwali bash for delegates of Dolce & Gabbana, she chose to wear Anamika Khanna at the special occasion.

Anamika Khanna designed the 10 kg velvet lehenga that was studded with pearls, gold and silver and was given as a gift by Simi Garewal to Lady Gaga – her celebrity guest at her talk show: ‘Simi Selects: India’s Most Desirable. Recently, Sonam Kapoor along with sister Rhea Kapoor wore outfits from Anamika's collection of Everything is AK-OK.

Oprah donned Khanna's outfits at various occasions, from the Women in the World Summit to special reception at the Black Panther Other celebrities including Deepika Padukone, Nita Ambani Isha Ambani, Shloka Mehta, Radhika Merchant, Katrina Kaif, Neha Dhupia are seen wearing her creations at various occasions.

=== Influence in Bollywood ===
Khanna has designed collections for a number of Bollywood movies like Mausam, Fashion, Aisha, and Bhaag Milkha Bhaag. She was the costume designer for the lead actress of the movie Prem Ratan Dhan Payo released in 2015. Khanna has designed the outfits that Simi Garewal wore in her talk show: ‘Simi Selects: India’s Most Desirable’.

== Notable shows ==
- Lakme Fashion Week (1999): Khanna was among the 33 designers, who were part of India's first Lakme Fashion Week at Taj Palace, New Delhi.
- Wills Fashion Week, 2005:She presented her spring/summer collection titled The Botanist at the WFW. Her collection consisted of clothes made from muslin and chiffon.
- Paris Fashion Week (2007): Khanna presented her designs at the Paris Fashion Week.
- HDIL India Couture Week (2008):Khanna's collection involved her signature dhoti-pants. The clothes were created using fine cotton, chiffon, satin and georgette. The focus of the collection was on cuts and drapes.
- Lakme Fashion Week (2009): Khanna at the Lakme Fashion Week presented a bridal collection featuring modern silhouettes, flawless embroidery and a wide variety of colours.
- The India Premier London Fashion Week (2010): Khanna participated in the Autumn/Winter edition of The India Premier London Fashion Week.
- Lakme Summer Resort (2011):Khanna presented her collections that consisted of kurtas embroidered with chikan work, pajamas, lehengas, churidars, Jodhpuri pants and mojris. Her collection was primarily black and white.
- Delhi Couture Week (2012): Khanna presented a collection that comprised Kashmiri embroidery, zardosi and Parsi gara. In addition to dhoti-pants, her collection also featured floor-length jackets and waistcoats.
- PCJ Delhi Couture Week (2013): Khanna's collection featured clothes created from traditional wedding wear .
- India Couture Week(2014): Khanna presented her collection called ‘Luxury 2014’. It consisted of embroidered vests, lace capes/kimono, lehengas, saris, and churidars.
- Lakme Fashion Week (2015): Khanna was the finale designer and Bollywood stars Deepika Padukone and Kareena Kapoor Khan walked the ramp in outfits that she designed (a black cropped top with a pair of wide-legged pants for Deepika while a black, silver and white ensemble for Kareena).
- Indian Couture Week (2016): Khanna showcased her collection with Bollywood fashionista Sonam Kapoor as the show stopper, dressed in a loose blouse and a hued floral embroidered half saree. She further extended her aesthetic by foraying into jewellery design by collaborating with Amrapali Jewelers, Jaipur royalty-inspired range of costume jewellery.
- India Couture Week (2017) :
- Lakme Fashion Week (2018): Khanna presented her collection at the grand finale with Kareena Kapoor Khan as the showstopper; it was influenced by various tribes of the world and was an amalgamation of the modern and experimental. There was deconstruction, fringe and print in a palette of crème, ecru, red and the blackest black. The collection was about tribe of strong and powerful women who are not afraid to ‘do their own thing'.
- Everything is AKOK, RTW SS19: With SS19 Khanna launched her first collection on Instagram. The collection was inspired by what she describes as underground warriors, women who like her, battle immense challenges but are able to pull through and make the world a more caring, interesting, and beautiful place: living goddesses who are anything but just domestic and refuse to stand still on a pedestal.

== Style ==
Khanna has modernised Indian craft through her collections featuring the usage of zardosi, dhoti-pants, shararas, and lehengas. Her collections can be termed as decorously Indian but Goth, Punk and Bohemian at the same time. She has set forth a new trend in draping saris through three different drapes: The tulip drape, the wavy drape and the two-pallu in dhoti-style drape.

Khanna has been instrumental towards the modernisation of Indian craft through her modern wear made from Indian textiles. She has reinterpreted the Maharashtrian nine-yard sari to create dhoti-pants. They are actually dhoti style saris and have become the signature creations of Anamika Khanna. They have been worn by leading Bollywood superstars like Sonam Kapoor on multiple occasions. Anamika Khanna has set a new trend through her draped saris. She is well known for introducing the tulip drape, the wavy drape, and the two-pallu-in-dhoti drape.

Her collections featuring Trousseau, Prêt and Couture have been worn by Bollywood superstars to International Celebrities, including the likes of Oprah Winfrey, Arianna Huffington, Natalia Vodianova, Zadie Smith and even Sophia, the first social humanoid robot

== Awards & achievements ==
She is also the first female Indian fashion designer to display her collections at the Paris Fashion Week held in 2007. Ana mika was offered an exclusive contract by British Retail Giant Harrod's after her participation in the London Fashion Week, 2010.

Her philanthropist side was evident when she helped raise large amounts for the Tata cancer hospitals children's wing and for the Akshay Patra Foundation, with a show in London.

Anamika Khanna was one of the three designers who presented their collections in Khadi at the fashion show held by Fashion Design Council of India (FDCI) in coordination with Gujarat State Khadi and Village Industries for Narendra Modi’s made in India project. She is among the first Indian fashion designers to present their collections in Pakistan as part of the Bridal Asia event.

She collaborated with the brand Bvlgari to launch them in New Delhi and did a private event with them in Singapore.

Featured in Business of Fashion for five consecutive years, Khanna has been listed by BOF500 as a crucial part in shaping the $2.4 trillion fashion industry. She was yet again awarded as the most stylish designer by the Hindustan Times and bestowed with the title at The Hindustan Times India's Most Stylish Awards, 2019

In 2006, she was selected by the Elle magazine as one of the 50 Style Icons of the Year. Verve Magazine included her in its 2006 Verve Power Issue as well as in its list of 50 Powerful Women in 2010. She was also featured in the Verve Perennial Stylish People list. India Today selected her as one of India’s 25 most powerful women in 2011 while Femina included her in its list of 50 Most Powerful Women in India as well as in the list of 100 People Impacting India the Most. Anamika Khanna was also included in the list of 25 most beautiful people by the Hi! Blitz magazine.

Khanna has been recently nominated for the Swachh Bharat Abhiyan. She has been listed in the Business of Fashion elite list of 500 people shaping the global fashion industry. She was invited as a Speaker at a Panel Discussion in a student-run conference held at Harvard Business School & Harvard Kennedy School. For five consecutive years she has been featured in the BOF500, the definitive professional index of the people shaping the $2.4 trillion fashion industry, hand-selected by the editors of The Business of Fashion, based on hundreds of nominations received from current BoF 500 members, extensive data analysis and research.

Invited by the Royals! At the official start of UK-India Year of Culture, the couturier was invited by the Queen of the United Kingdom and The Duke of Edinburgh at Buckingham Palace to grace the occasion.

=== Awards and nominations ===
==== Awards ====
- Texcellence Award – Outstanding Boutique (2004)
- Kingfisher Award – Fashion Designer of the Year (2004)
- FICCI Ladies Organization's Young Woman Achiever's Award (2006)
- Marudhar Gaurav Award from the Rajasthan Foundation, Kolkata (2007)
- FICCI Ladies Organization Woman of Substance Award (2008)
- Bharat Nirman Award (2010)
- Audi RITZ Icon Award (2011)
- She Award (2011)
- Export Council Award
- Hello! Hall of Fame Awards – Designer of the Year award (2016)
- Fashionably Yours Award by T2, The Telegraph (2017)
- Indian Affairs Fashion Designer of the Year 2017 at the 8th Annual India Leadership Conclave & Indian Affairs Business Leadership Awards.
- Vogue Women of The Year Awards – Designer of the Year (2018).
- Pinkvilla Style Icons Awards - Trailblazing Fashion Designer of the Year (2023)

==== Nominations ====
- MTV Youth Icon Awards – Breakthrough Designer of the Year (2003)
- MTV Lycra Style Awards – Designer of the Year (2004)
- F Awards – Designer of the Year (2004)
- MTV Style Awards – Designer of the Year (2005)
