= Rohit Khosla =

Indian fashion designer (1958–1994)

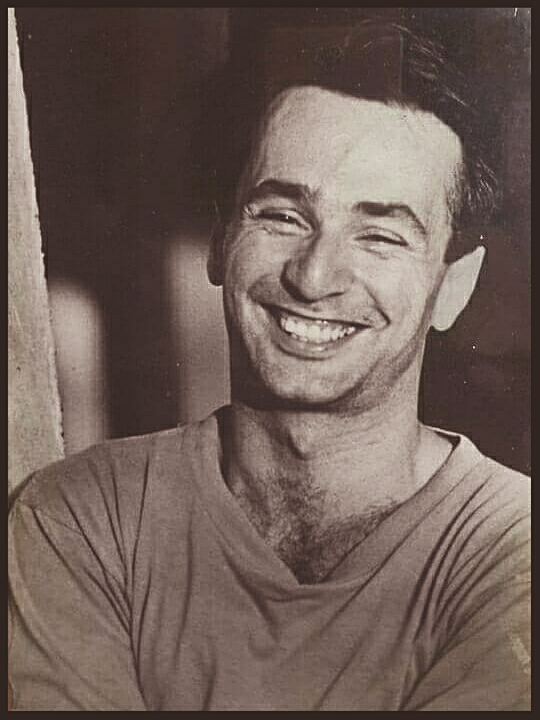
- Born: 29 November 1958
- Died: 16 February 1994 (aged 35)
- Occupation: Fashion designer

Rohit Khosla (29 November 1958 – 16 February 1994) was a pioneer of the contemporary fashion industry in India.

Khosla studied in England, worked with designers in New York, but returned to India to start his own label in 1987, along with his sister, designer Rohini Khosla.

== Early life ==
Born in November 1958 to Usha and Kamal Khosla in an affluent Punjabi Hindu family, Rohit had always dreamed of becoming a fashion pioneer.

An alumnus of The Doon School in Dera Doon, he took a foundation course in art and followed it with studying fashion at Kingston University. In college, his contemporaries were Nick Coleman, John Richmond and Helen Storey. He is quoted in his biography Vanguard, penned by Rohini Khosla, "studying in England was pure bliss -- ideas just flowing, fabrics everywhere and fashion obsessive people all around me."

He entered the Indian fashion scene when it was still a nascent industry and left his hallmark.

In those days, it was considered a bold step to enter fashion, especially when one had such a high-profile qualification. Khosla was the first Indian fashion designer to launch an haute couture label. His family was extremely supportive of his fashion career. In his short life, Khosla spearheaded major contributions to the Indian fashion industry.

== Career ==
In 1987, he co-founded Ensemble, India's popular designer label store in New Delhi, with Tarun and Sal Tahiliani, which started with five labels: Tarun Tahiliani, Rohit Khosla, Neil Bieff, Amaya, Abu Jani and Sandeep Khosla.

Many leading fashion designers of India trained under Rohit Khosla, including Aparna Chandra, Ranna Gill, Sonam Dobal and JJ Valaya.

== Death ==
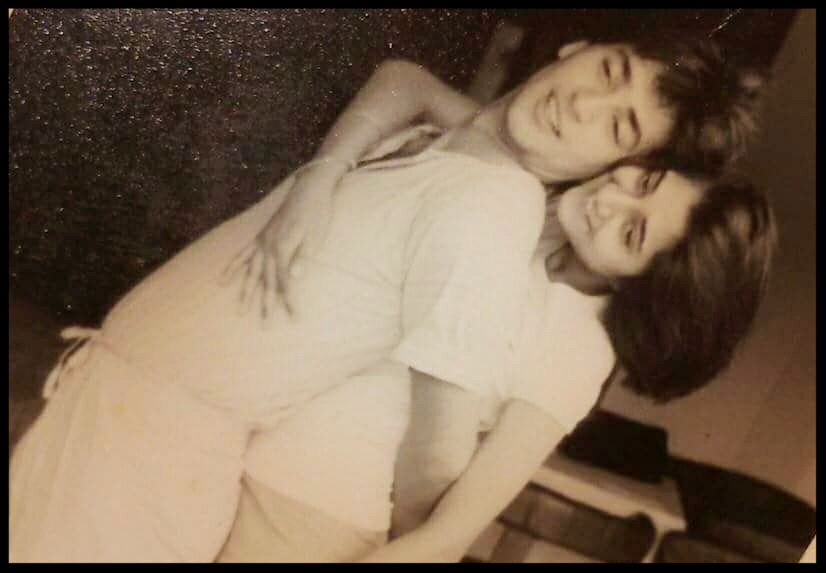
Rohit Khosla with a friend

Khosla, who was bisexual, died in 1994, aged 36, due to cancer. He had earlier contracted HIV/AIDS.

== Legacy ==
In 1998, Rohini Khosla published a book on his life and work, titled Rohit Khosla, Vanguard. In 2007 the India Fashion Week paid a tribute to him, with designers like Rohit Bal dedicating his collection to him.

The annual India Zee F Awards presents the Rohit Khosla Award for 'Debutante Designer of the Year'.
