= JJ Valaya =

Indian fashion designer (born 1967)

- JJ Valaya in 2010
- Born: Jagsharanjit Singh Ahlowalia; 8 October 1967 (age 59); Jodhpur, Rajasthan, India
- Education: National Institute of Fashion Technology (NIFT), New Delhi (1989–1991)
- Occupations: Fashion designer; Couturier; Photographer
- Labels: JJ Valaya Couture; JJV Kapurthala; Valaya Home
- Spouse: Meghna Valaya
- Children: 2 (Hoorvi and Someya)
- Website: valaya.com

JJ Valaya (born Jagsharan Jit Singh Ahlowalia; 8 October 1967) is an Indian fashion designer, couturier, photographer and entrepreneur based in New Delhi. He is the founder and creative director of the House of Valaya, a luxury fashion house established in 1992 that is known for bridal couture, menswear and lifestyle design. His work is recognised for combining Indian royal and princely aesthetics with Persian, Ottoman and Art Deco influences through contemporary tailoring and craftsmanship.

JJ Valaya is regarded as one of the pioneers of India's modern fashion industry. He is widely credited with staging India's first solo fashion show by an Indian designer and among the first Indian designers to share a runway with an international counterpart. He is a founding member of the Board of Governors of the Fashion Design Council of India (FDCI), which helped establish India's organised fashion week circuit.

Beyond couture, JJ Valaya has worked in photography, publishing, interiors and costume design. He collaborated with Academy Award–winning costume designer Ruth E. Carter on the Hollywood films Coming 2 America (2021) and Black Panther: Wakanda Forever (2022), contributing couture craftsmanship and textile development. He also became Swarovski's first global fashion ambassador and has maintained a long-standing creative association with the company.

== Early life and education ==
JJ Valaya was born as Jagsharanjit Singh Ahlowalia on 8 October 1967 in Jhalamand, Jodhpur, Rajasthan, into a Sikh family with a military background. His father served as a brigadier in the Indian Army, resulting in the family relocating frequently during his childhood. Valaya spent his early years across several Indian cities, including Jodhpur, Pune, Lucknow, Delhi and Chandigarh. He attended St. Francis' College, Lucknow, where he developed an early interest in drawing, painting and calligraphy. He has credited his upbringing and exposure to India's diverse architecture, crafts and cultural traditions with shaping his design sensibility.

Although he initially intended to pursue a career in accountancy, completing a commerce degree in Chandigarh and briefly training as a chartered accountant, he ultimately chose fashion as his profession.

In 1989, he enrolled at the National Institute of Fashion Technology (NIFT), New Delhi, graduating in 1991 as part of the institute's early batches. While at NIFT, he received several student awards, including the Prix d'Incitation (Paris), the Thapar-Dupont Medal, the Elyxa Award and the KLM-NIFT Trophy. Following graduation, he apprenticed under designer Rohit Khosla before establishing his own fashion house.

== Career ==
=== House of Valaya ===
In 1992, JJ Valaya and his elder brother Tribhavan Jit ("TJ") Singh founded the House of Valaya, with JJ Valaya serving as creative director while TJ Singh oversaw the business operations. The house initially focused on couture before expanding into bridalwear, menswear, ready-to-wear, accessories, interiors and hospitality design.

From its inception, the House of Valaya distinguished itself through an emphasis on hand craftsmanship, embroidery, textile innovation and historical research. The label became one of India's leading couture houses, particularly within the bridal sector, presenting collections at India Couture Week, Lakmé Fashion Week and Wills India Fashion Week over several decades.

The House later expanded into additional verticals, including JJV and Valaya Home. Its headquarters and production facilities are located in Gurugram and Manesar, Haryana, while its flagship retail destination, The World of Valaya, is located at the JW Marriott, Aerocity, New Delhi, housing couture, menswear, accessories, interiors and photography under one roof.

=== Design philosophy ===
Throughout his career, JJ Valaya has developed a design language rooted in what the House of Valaya describes as the "Royal Nomad" philosophy, combining inspirations drawn from Indian princely states with Persian, Ottoman, Mughal and European decorative traditions.

His collections frequently reinterpret historical references through contemporary silhouettes, employing intricate embroidery, woven textiles, handcrafted embellishment and custom-developed prints.

In a 2025 interview, Valaya described his creative approach as "minimax", referring to a restrained design philosophy executed within an overall maximalist aesthetic.

Recurring visual elements across the House of Valaya include the brand's signature Shifting Leaves Chevron pattern and the Diasun Monogram. The younger bridge-to-luxury label, JJV, uses a Phoenix emblem originally conceived by JJ Valaya during his student years at NIFT Delhi.

=== Sabbatical and return ===
After presenting Bolshoi Bazaar in 2015, Valaya stepped back from the couture runway, later describing himself in interviews as having grown uninspired by the fashion scene and wanting to reassess his creative direction. The sabbatical lasted roughly three years, spanning 2016 to 2019, during which the house paused the presentation and sale of new couture collections.

Valaya returned to the runway on 7 September 2019 with his comeback couture collection, Tabriz, shown at the Imperial Hotel, New Delhi. Named after the historic Persian city that once served as a regional capital, the collection was inspired by the arts, crafts and material culture of Persia from the sixteenth to the nineteenth centuries and was developed over roughly six months. Tabriz was presented in three segments: Farsh, drawing on Persian hunting carpets and Art Deco design; Naqshband (meaning "master craftsman"), built around floral metallic-thread patterns, crystals and pearls on silks, velvets and tulle; and Khayyam, inspired by the tribal aesthetic of nomadic Persia's royal tentmakers, combining antique mirrorwork and unconventional appliqué techniques with the house's signature prints. The collection, which included a bridal lehenga embellished with roughly 12,000 Swarovski crystals, was framed by the brand as a continuation of its "Royal Nomad" design philosophy.

Valaya's return was widely covered in the Indian fashion press as marking the house's official revival after its multi-year hiatus, and preceded subsequent collections including Bursa (2020–21), Alma (2022), Muraqqa (2024) and East (2025). East was showcased during India Couture Week 2025, with Abhishek Sharma as the opening showstopper and Rasha Thadani and Ibrahim Ali Khan as closing showstoppers.

=== JJV. Kapurthala ===
In 2022, the House of Valaya launched JJV. Kapurthala, a bridge-to-luxury label positioned below its couture offering. The label draws its identity from Kapurthala, Punjab—the ancestral homeland of the Ahlowalia family—and from the legacy of Maharaja Jagatjit Singh of Kapurthala, whose cosmopolitan outlook, extensive travels and deep appreciation for European culture have been recurring sources of inspiration in JJ Valaya's work.

Often described as one of India's most Francophile rulers, Maharaja Jagatjit Singh cultivated strong cultural ties with France while maintaining the traditions of the Kapurthala court. Valaya has cited the Maharaja's spirit of travel, cultural exchange and refined aesthetic as central influences on the creative direction of JJV. Kapurthala, which interprets these ideas through contemporary occasion wear, prints and accessible luxury.

The label's collections are sequentially titled in Punjabi—Char, Panj, Chhē, Satt and Atth—reflecting both the House's Punjabi heritage and the continuing narrative inspired by Kapurthala. While retaining the broader design language of the House of Valaya, JJV. Kapurthala incorporates lighter silhouettes, simplified embroidery, modern tailoring and, in selected collections, sustainable textile innovations.

=== International presentations ===
Over the course of his career, JJ Valaya has presented collections internationally in cities including Dubai, Singapore, Hong Kong, London, Paris, New York, Johannesburg and Colombo. His work has also been exhibited or retailed in markets across the Middle East, Europe and North America.

The House of Valaya operated international boutiques including locations in Dubai and San Francisco, extending its couture, bridalwear and accessories to overseas clientele.

== Selected collections ==
Since establishing the House of Valaya in 1992, JJ Valaya has presented couture collections at India Couture Week, Lakmé Fashion Week, Wills India Fashion Week and international showcases. His collections frequently draw upon historical narratives, travel, architecture and cross-cultural influences.

=== Couture collections ===
Year	Collection	Inspiration
2010	Alika	Introduced the Alika Jacket, later revisited for the House's twenty-fifth anniversary collaboration with Swarovski.
2011	Tasveer	Inspired by the evolution of photography from monochrome to the digital era.
2012	Azrak	Referenced Ottoman architecture and West Asian artistic traditions.
2013	The Maharaja of Madrid	Inspired by Maharaja Jagatjit Singh of Kapurthala and Anita Delgado, combining Indian royal and Spanish influences.
2015	Bolshoi Bazaar	Drew upon Russian decorative arts and the Bolshoi Theatre.
2019	Tabriz	Marked the House's return to couture after a multi-year hiatus; inspired by Persian art and craftsmanship.
2020–21	Bursa	Inspired by the Ottoman Empire and the historic city of Bursa.
2022	Alma	Celebrated the thirtieth anniversary of the House of Valaya.
2024	Muraqqa	Referenced Islamic manuscript traditions, miniature painting and illuminated albums.
2025	East	Explored the historical exchange of culture, craft and design across Eastern civilisations.

=== JJV. Kapurthala collections ===
The JJV. Kapurthala collections are inspired by the travels of Maharaja Jagatjit Singh of Kapurthala and are sequentially named in Punjabi.

Year	Collection
2024	Char
2025	Panj
2025	Chhē (Spring–Summer)
2025	Satt
2026	Atth

== Film costume work ==
The House of Valaya has collaborated with Academy Award–winning American costume designer Ruth E. Carter, contributing couture craftsmanship, textile development and embroidery to major Hollywood productions.

In 2021, the house contributed to Coming 2 America, starring Eddie Murphy, working alongside Carter's costume department to develop handcrafted textiles and embellishments for the film's costumes.

The collaboration continued with Marvel Studios' Black Panther: Wakanda Forever (2022). JJ Valaya was among a group of international ateliers invited to contribute bespoke costume elements for the film. Working closely with Carter's studio in Los Angeles over an eight-month period, the atelier produced approximately eighteen couture garments and textile components for the wardrobe of Queen Ramonda, portrayed by Angela Bassett. Among these was the purple velvet ensemble with gold embellishment worn during the film's opening United Nations sequence. The collaboration showcased the House's traditional embroidery techniques, antique metalwork and handcrafted embellishment on an international cinematic platform.

== Photography ==
Alongside fashion, JJ Valaya is a self-taught fine-art photographer. His photographic work explores architecture, portraiture, heritage and the relationship between historic and contemporary environments. He has described photography as an independent creative discipline that complements, rather than informs, his work in fashion.

In 2011, Valaya presented his first solo exhibition, Decoded Paradox, in New Delhi before it travelled to Mumbai. Accompanied by a photography monograph of the same name, the exhibition juxtaposed Delhi's Mughal and colonial architecture with its rapidly evolving urban landscape.

His subsequent exhibitions include The Soul in the Space: A Journey of Architectural Influences (2012), featuring architectural studies photographed in Scotland and India; Revisiting Beauty (2015), which expanded upon the themes introduced in Decoded Paradox; and Lalaari: Conversations with the Universe (2019), a mixed-media exhibition combining portrait photography with textile and embroidery techniques.

Valaya has also published the travel photography series The Little Book of Memories, documenting destinations including Istanbul and Goa.

== Exhibitions ==
Alongside his career in fashion, JJ Valaya has maintained an active practice as a fine-art photographer, presenting solo exhibitions and participating in interdisciplinary art and fashion projects.

Selected exhibitions include:

- Decoded Paradox (2011), New Delhi and Mumbai — Valaya's debut solo photography exhibition, exploring the dialogue between Delhi's historic architecture and its contemporary urban landscape.
- The Soul in the Space: A Journey of Architectural Influences (2012), Nature Morte Gallery, New Delhi — an exhibition of architectural photography featuring works created in Scotland, Jodhpur and Chandigarh.
- Revisiting Beauty (2015) — an expansion of the themes introduced in Decoded Paradox, examining architecture and portraiture through fine-art photography.
- Lalaari: Conversations with the Universe (2019), Vis a Vis Gallery, New Delhi — a mixed-media portrait exhibition combining photography with textiles, embroidery and handcrafted elements.
- Inheritances of Light, Geographies of Loss (12–14 January 2026), Travancore Palace, New Delhi — a multidisciplinary exhibition organised by Engendered in association with the Embassy of the Netherlands, exploring light as a cultural inheritance across Dutch and Indian artistic traditions. The opening concluded with a special couture presentation by JJ Valaya on Mughal couture, textiles and craftsmanship, featuring archival textiles and layered silhouettes.

== Publications ==
In addition to his work in fashion, JJ Valaya has published books accompanying his photographic practice.

- Decoded Paradox (2011)
- The Little Book of Memories: Istanbul (2014)
- The Little Book of Memories: Goa (2017)

== Bridal and menswear ==
Bridal couture has remained one of the principal pillars of the House of Valaya since its establishment. The house produces bespoke bridal lehengas, saris, gowns and occasion wear characterised by intricate hand embroidery, custom textiles and couture craftsmanship.

The brand's menswear includes sherwanis, bandhgalas, Nehru jackets, tuxedos and Indo-Western ensembles, combining traditional Indian textile techniques with contemporary tailoring. Dedicated menswear collections have been presented at India Men's Fashion Week and India Couture Week, while the house has also developed seasonal menswear under the JJV. Kapurthala label.

The House of Valaya additionally offers Muse, its highest tier of bespoke couture service. Developed as a one-to-one design experience, Muse involves direct consultation with JJ Valaya and the atelier to create garments intended exclusively for a single client.

== Business and industry role ==
JJ Valaya is a founding member of the Board of Governors of the Fashion Design Council of India (FDCI), the organisation responsible for establishing and promoting India's organised fashion week calendar.

He was appointed Swarovski's first global fashion ambassador, initiating a long-standing creative partnership with the Austrian crystal manufacturer. In 2017, to commemorate the twenty-fifth anniversary of the House of Valaya, the brand collaborated with Swarovski on The Alika Project, inviting leading Indian designers and labels to reinterpret Valaya's signature Alika Jacket using Swarovski crystal embellishments.

Over the course of his career, JJ Valaya has also expanded the House of Valaya beyond couture into accessories, interiors, hospitality design and lifestyle products through ventures including Valaya Home and JJV. Kapurthala.

== Awards and recognition ==
Throughout his career, JJ Valaya has received recognition for his contribution to Indian fashion and design.

His distinctions include:

- Recipient of the Padma Shri, one of India's highest civilian honours, for his contribution to the arts.
- Founding member of the Board of Governors of the Fashion Design Council of India.
- Swarovski's first global fashion ambassador.
- Widely credited as the first Indian fashion designer to stage a solo runway presentation in India.
- Among the first Indian designers to present alongside an international designer on the runway.
- Recipient of several student honours while at the National Institute of Fashion Technology, including the Prix d'Incitation (Paris), the Thapar-Dupont Medal, the Elyxa Award and the KLM-NIFT Trophy.

== Personal life ==
JJ Valaya is married to Meghna Valaya, and the couple have two daughters, Hoorvi and Someya.

In interviews, Valaya has spoken about balancing family life with his creative practice and has acknowledged his mother's interest in embroidery and garment-making as one of his earliest influences. He has also cited his upbringing in an Army family and his extensive travels across India as formative experiences that continue to shape his design philosophy.

== Legacy ==
JJ Valaya is regarded as one of the pioneers of contemporary Indian couture and among the designers who helped establish the country's organised luxury fashion industry during the 1990s. Over more than three decades, his work has been characterised by extensive historical research, cross-cultural influences and an emphasis on craftsmanship.

His collections frequently reference the visual cultures of Indian princely states alongside Persian, Ottoman, Mughal and European decorative traditions, reflecting what the House of Valaya describes as its "Royal Nomad" philosophy.

In addition to couture, Valaya has expanded his creative practice into photography, interiors, hospitality, publishing and film costume design. Through the House of Valaya and JJV. Kapurthala, he continues to work across couture, ready-to-wear, accessories, lifestyle and bespoke design.
