= Tahiliani =

Tahiliani is a surname. Notable people with the surname include:

- Radhakrishna Hariram Tahiliani (1930–2015), Indian Navy admiral
- Tarun Tahiliani, Indian fashion designer
