= Fashion Design Council of India =

Organization

- Established: 1998
- Website: www.fdci.org

The Fashion Design Council of India (FDCI) is an organization in India. Its founding presidents are Rohit Shukla, Ritu Kumar, and Tarun Tahiliani. FDCI is a non-profit independent association of fashion designers formed in December 1998 to promote the Business of Fashion in India. Currently, the office is based in New Delhi with Sunil Sethi as the President. FDCI is supported by the Indian Textile Ministry & it also works very closely with fashion institute like NIFT.

== Fashion events ==
Fashion events it sponsors include:

- The bi-annual prêt weeks for womenswear - India Fashion Week,
- A week for men's fashion- India Men's Week,
- The annual platform for couture - Global India Couture Week.

In 2006, Montana World of Wearable Art (TM), (WOW), and FDCI collaborated to encourage Indian participation in the latter's fashion show in New Zealand. The Council also collaborated with Vogue to launch the Vogue Fashion Fund in India to promote emerging designers. Through this project, the winner (decided by the selected jury panel) is awarded a grand cash prize and a chance to be featured in the India issue of the magazine. Apart from this, the winning talent also gets an opportunity to commercialize his/her brand with a leading retailer, and gain access to fashion platforms like India Fashion Week and a one-year business mentorship with an industry professional.

In 2013, FDCI collaborated with the Delhi-based Cotton Council International (CCI) to launch a reality show, Let's Design, to promote the use of cotton in the fashion industry. The winner was awarded a direct entry to India Fashion Week Spring Summer edition at the young talent pool to showcase the collection along with prize money of ten lakhs INR.

== Charitable initiatives ==
FDCI organizes the annual mega-designer sale, offering designer garments at heavy discounts. Five percent of the sale proceeds from this event go towards various charities like Divya Chaya Trust in Kolkata, Observation Home, Mumbai, and the relief fund of Gujarat earthquake victims to name a few. In 2003, four designers: Anju Modi, Anjana Bhargava, Puja Duggal, and Ameet Sikka tied up with nine artists Jatin Das, Sudip Roy, Niren Sengupta and Jai Zharotia, among them to paint garments ranging from the traditional salwar kameez to trousers and skirts. The result was a novel collection for a charity.

In 2010, the Design Council along with the organization Khushii (Kinship for Humanitarian, Social and Holistic Intervention in India) held the ceremony of Art on Wheels on the last day of WIFW to raise funds for the NGO's global development initiative – World Action Forum (WAF) for causes like educating children, empowering village communities, etc. Twelve well-known artists like Dilip Sharma, Farhad Hussain, George Martin, Hindol Brahmbhatt, Jayasri Burman, Jagannath Panda, Paresh Maity, Sanjay Bhattacharyya, Satish Gupta, Sudhanshu Sutar and Yusuf Arakkal had hand-painted a limited edition of autorickshaws. The autos were also auctioned at The Claridges for bidding. FDCI, to generate funds for a People for Animals (PFA) initiative entered into a design alliance with the carpet weavers to weave the creations of artists such as S.H. Raza, MF Husain and Paresh Maity along with the designs of fashion designers such as Rohit Bal, Manish Arora, JJ Valaya, Rajesh Pratap Singh, Sabyasachi Mukherjee and Ritu Kumar, on a museum quality carpet that can be displayed on walls or floors. The carpets bought from the exhibitions were available at a considerably lower price to raise funds for the PFA initiative. In 2012, the Fashion Council partnered with PETA (People for the Ethical Treatment of Animals) to encourage the cause of Vegan Fashion in the country by announcing the Fashion for Freedom Boycott Bill. In the same year, a significant initiative of signing a pact between the Ministry of Textiles (MOT) & Fashion Design Council of India (FDCI) was also taken.
