= Vratika Gupta =

Indian fashion designer

- Born: India
- Occupations: Fashion designer, entrepreneur
- Title: Founder of Maison Sia

Vratika Gupta is an Indian fashion designer and entrepreneur. She is the founder of Maison Sia, a luxury home décor and furniture company based in India.

== Background ==
Gupta is a graduate from the National Institute of Fashion Technology (NIFT) and Pearl Academy of Fashion. She began her career as an apparel designer at Anjuman Fashions. Later she worked as a designer for the fashion label Anju Modi from 2009 to 2011. She then joined Two White Birds and assumed the role of its design director. In 2017, Gupta founded Vratika & Nakul. Later in 2022, she founded Maison Sia, a luxury home décor brand offering furniture and decorative products.

== Personal life ==
Gupta is married to Indian serial IT entrepreneur Nakul Aggarwal.
