= Shravan Kummar =

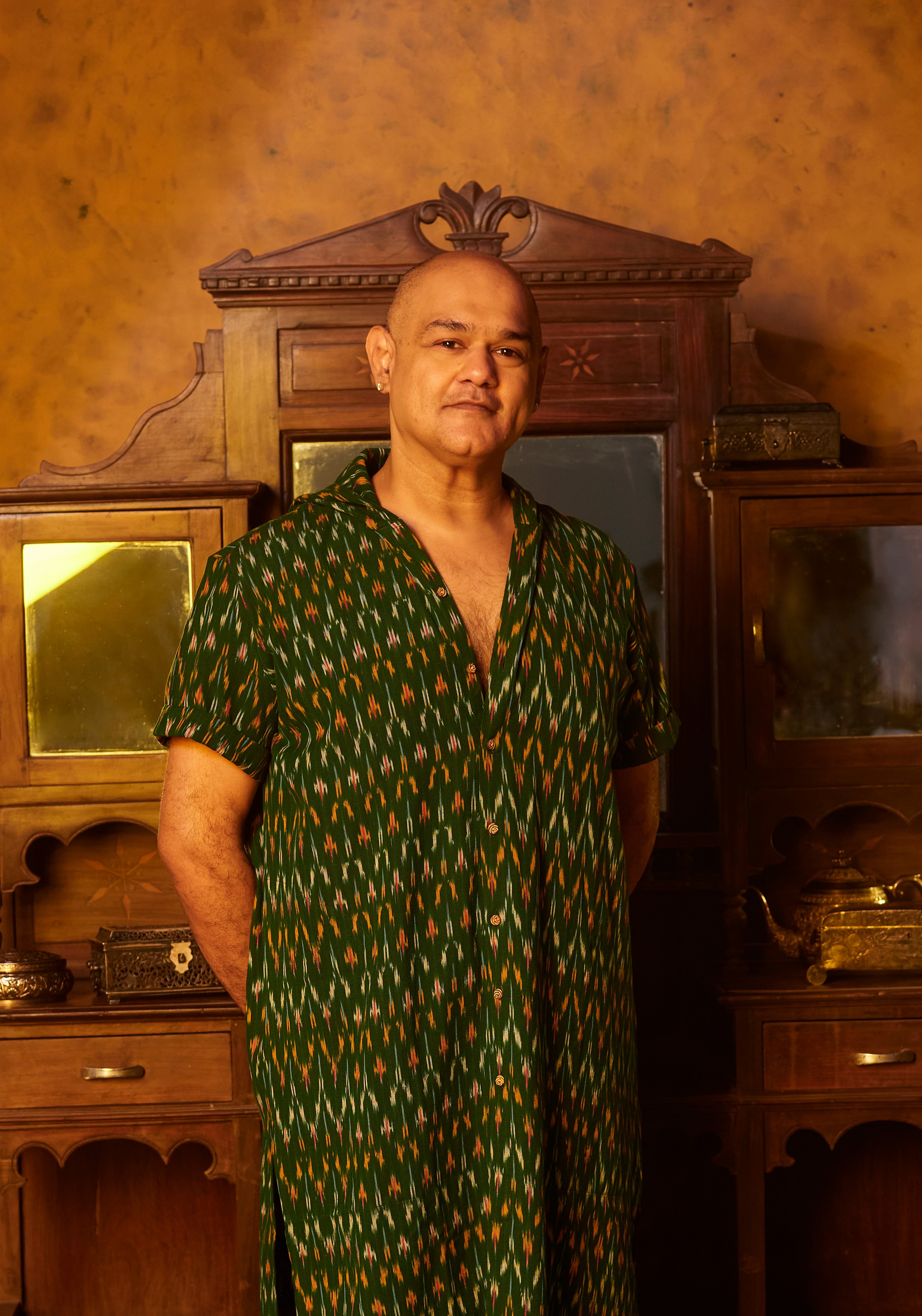
- Born: Hyderabad, India
- Occupation: Fashion designer
- Years active: 1996–present
- Known for: Sustainable fashion; revival of handloom textiles
- Label: Shravan Studio

Shravan Kummar is an Indian fashion designer based in Hyderabad. He is known for his work in sustainable fashion and for incorporating traditional handloom textiles into contemporary design. He operates his design label, Shravan Studio.

He is reported to have been the first Indian designer included in Cornell University’s Nixon Distinguished Speaker Series.

== Early life and education ==
Kummar was born in Hyderabad. He secured the 363rd rank in the medical entrance examination and enrolled at Gandhi Medical College, which he left during his first year. He later completed a design program at the National Institute of Fashion Technology, Hyderabad, and attended the London College of Fashion, where he studied colour psychology.

== Career ==
Kummar began his career in 1996 with the establishment of his label, Shravan Studio, in Hyderabad. His work has been worn by several film actors, including Anushka Shetty, Nandita Das, Shabana Azmi, Nayanthara, Huma Qureshi, Kamal Haasan, Rajinikanth, Mammootty and Chiranjeevi.

In 2013, he launched Aalayam Temple of Weaves, a handloom showroom in Jubilee Hills designed with elements inspired by the Guruvayur Temple. The store showcased handloom saris sourced from weaving communities across India, and a portion of its profits supported the Weavers’ Association of Aalayam Society.

In 2017, Kummar presented a Khadi focused collection at India Runway Week, featuring men's jackets with Kalamkari motifs and solid coloured lehenga ensembles.

In 2018, his designs were shown at the Dubai Fashion League Series, where actor Sunny Leone appeared as the showstopper.

In 2022, his collection was presented at the Indian Designer Show Season 4, where Sini Shetty served as the showstopper. Also in 2022, his work was featured at the 17th American Telugu Association Convention and Youth Conference, held at the Walter E. Washington Convention Center in Washington, D.C..

Also in 2022, Kummar was selected to represent at International Eco Fashion Week Australia, where his label showcased Kalamkari natural cotton designs and incorporated the Ahmedabadi textile art form Mata ni Pachedi.
