= Jayanthi Ballal =

Indian fashion entrepreneur and designer

- Born: 18 September 1972 (age 53); Mysore, India
- Education: Vogue Institute of Fashion, Bangalore
- Occupations: Fashion designer and entrepreneur
- Known for: Mysore Fashion Week
- Website: Official Website

Jayanthi Ballal (born 18 September 1972 ) is an Indian fashion entrepreneur and designer, known for founding the Mysore Fashion Week.

== Early life and education ==
After graduation, she started a tiny tailoring unit in her house. Later she started the contemporary boutique called Needle Works. She had done more than 200 fashion shows all over India and launched more than 300 faces. In 2014, she started Mysore Fashion Week on the lines of Lakme Fashion.

== Design career ==
In 2011, Ballal forayed into haute couture with the launch of her fashion label. Since then, models and actresses including Raveena Tandon, Soha Ali Khan, Bruna Abdullah, Gauahar Khan, Adah Sharma and others have walked the ramp, showcasing her collections.

== Entrepreneurial career ==
In 2014, Ballal announced that the first season of the Mysore Fashion Week.
