= Tanu Kashyap =

Indian Administrative Service (IAS) officer

Director-General of National Institute of Fashion Technology
- Incumbent
- Assumed office 7 December 2023

Personal details
- Born: August 10, 1979 (age 47)
- Education: University of Delhi; Jawaharlal Nehru University
- Occupation: IAS officer

Tanu Kashyap (born 10 August 1979) is an Indian Administrative Service (IAS) officer of the 2005 Punjab cadre. She is currently serving as the Director General of the National Institute of Fashion Technology (NIFT) since 7 December 2023.

== Early life and education ==
Kashyap completed her Bachelor of Arts (B.A.) from the Delhi University. She later obtained a Master of Arts (M.A.) and M.Phil. degree from Jawaharlal Nehru University, New Delhi.

== Career ==
Tanu Kashyap joined the Indian Administrative Service in 2005 as part of the Punjab cadre. During her career, she has served in several administrative positions including Secretary, Director, Joint Development Commissioner, Commissioner, Transport Commissioner, Deputy Commissioner, Sub-Divisional Magistrate, Junior Scale officer, and Assistant Commissioner.

She was appointed as the Director General of the National Institute of Fashion Technology in December 2023.
