= Indo-Western clothing =

Fusion of Western and South Asian fashion

Indo-Western clothing is the fusion of Western and South Asian fashion.

== History ==
Until as late as 1961, the beach city of India known as Goa was still under Portuguese control. In fact, the Portuguese did not even formally recognize Indian sovereignty over the city until 1975. Throughout the years India was home to many European colonies, but the two most influential have been the Portuguese and the British. The event that began the colonization process of India was when famed Portuguese explorer Vasco da Gama discovered a trade route into Kerala linking Europe and India. The Portuguese created a lengthy relationship with India that was predicated on the spice trade.

Due to the Portuguese occupation of Goa, the Goan culture and people were heavily influenced by the Portuguese culture. In 1510 Goa experienced the Portuguese conquest of Goa, which resulted in a heavy Christianization of the region. Events like this helped shape the culture of contemporary Goa.

Then from 1782 to 1800, the people of Goa underwent the Goa inquisition. During this time people could be heavily persecuted if caught performing non-Christian worship, rituals, or clothing. Goa continued to receive strong Portuguese influence until their decline in the region during the 1800s. Although Goa is now a sovereign state of India, it still retains its Portuguese history and culture. In 2012, Goan designer Wendell Rodricks stated that “Indo-western clothing originated in Goa.”

On December 31, 1600, Queen Elizabeth I formally allowed trade in the East Indies to The Company of Merchants of London Trading into the East Indies. This was a strategic move to compete in the Dutch-controlled spice trade. In August 1858, the British crown formally gained control of India. At this time, Britain had control of most of India, through either direct control or vassal kingdoms. In 1858, the historical Indian independence movement began, which lasted until 1947. At midnight on August 15, 1947, the Indian independence movement came to an end as the Indian Independence Act is signed. The days following the signing of this bill were filled with bloodshed between the different religions of India.

Educated women who held important positions during the British Raj, began to create and wear early Indo western designs. These Indian women began to wear sarees with blouses that had puffy sleeves. These sleeves were much the same as puffy sleeves that were popular in Europe during the Victorian era. After independence, India entered the Golden Age of Cinema, which began to influence fashion and culture. During the 1960s, Indian culture was being influenced by the West, and this was very apparent in films at the time. In movies like An Evening in Paris, the Western influence is very visible through the clothing and setting of the film. The main male protagonist wears Western-styled suits, while the female protagonist wears some Western dresses and some Indo-western clothing.

In the 1960s and 1970s, at the same time as Western fashion was adopting elements of Indian dress, Indian fashion also absorbed elements of Western dress. This practice of mutual appropriation continued throughout the 1980s and 1990s, as multiculturalism in fashion design took hold, with Western designers incorporating traditional Indian crafts, textiles and techniques at the same time as Indian designers allowed the West to influence their work. While middle-class Indian women in migrant communities originally tended to favour Western styles for all occasions in the 1960s and 1970s, they gradually began to wear stylish Indian dress for special occasions as a status symbol equivalent to chic Western fashion. One example of a traditionally Indian garment that has been heavily influenced by Western fashion is the kurta suit, a reversal of the established tradition of Western fashion being influenced by Asian design. Geczy noted that an Indian woman wearing traditional clothing might find herself said to be "imitating" Western fashion, and that the boundaries between East and West in fashion were becoming increasingly blurred.

== 21st century ==
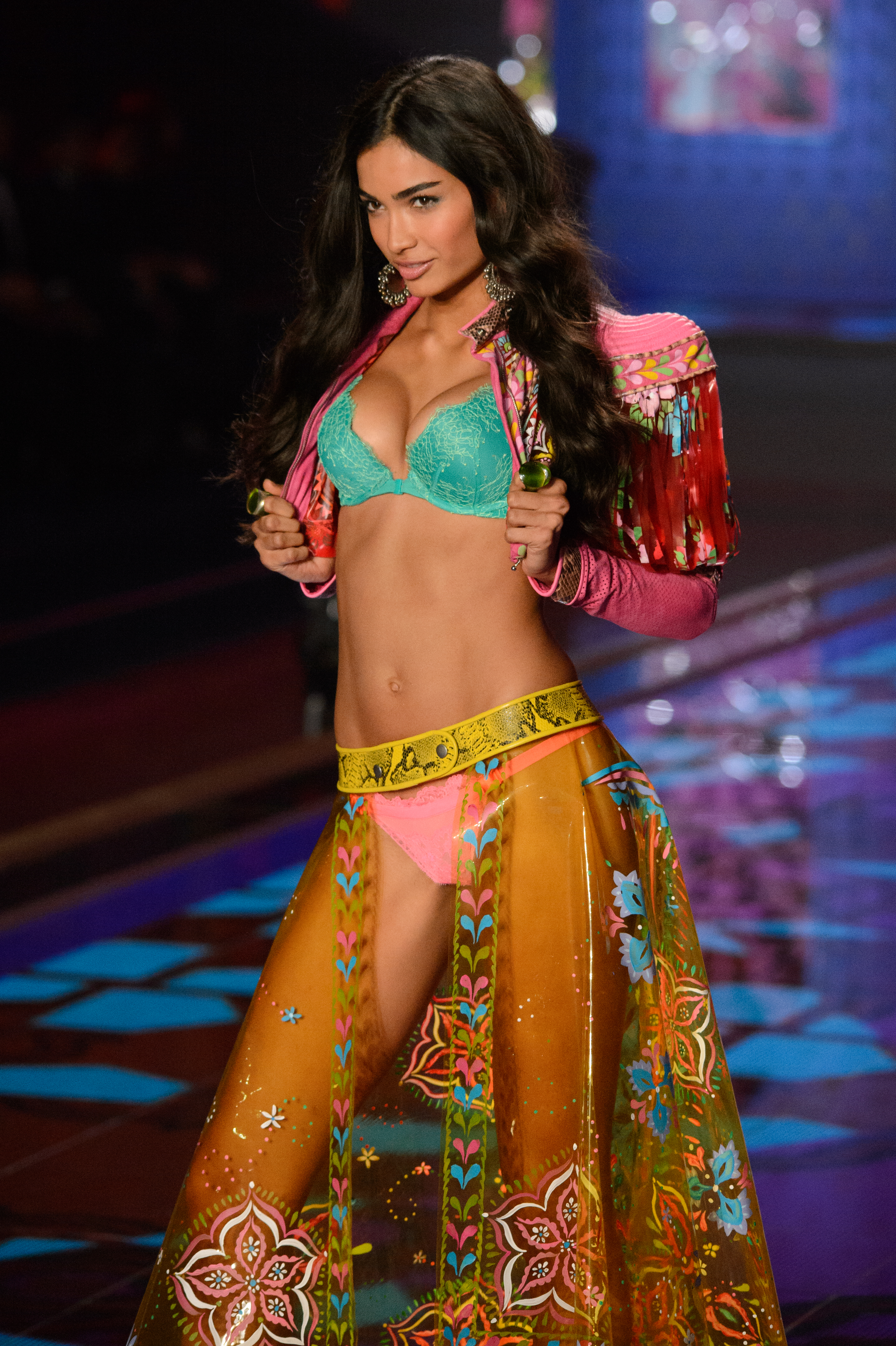
Kelly Gale models lingerie while wearing traditional-styled Indian clothing at Victoria's Secret Fashion Show in London, 2014

By the first decade of the 21st century, Western styles were well established as part of Indian fashion, with some professional Indian women favoring Western-style dresses over saris for office wear. Fashionable Indian women might take the traditional shalwar kameez and wear the kameez (tunic) with jeans, or the pants with a Western blouse.

Among the youth, there appears to be an enthusiastic approach to combining traditional clothes with a Western touch. With the increasing exposure of the Indian subcontinent to the Western world, the merging of women's clothing styles is inevitable. Many Indian and Pakistani women residing in the West still prefer to wear traditional salwar kameez and sarees; however, some women, particularly those of the younger generation, choose Indo-Western clothing.

The clothing of the quintessential Indo-Western ensemble is the trouser suit, which is a short kurta with straight pants and a dupatta. Newer designs often feature sleeveless tops, short dupattas, and pants with slits. New fusion fashions are emerging rapidly, as designers compete to produce designs in tune with current trends.

Additional examples of the fusion that Indo-Western clothing represents include wearing jeans with a choli, salwar, or kurta, adding a dupatta to a Western-style outfit, and wearing a lehnga (long skirt) with a tank top or halter top. For men Indian traditional Kurta with sports shoes and scarves.

== Popular styles of women's Indo-Western clothing ==
- Indo-Western kurtis are available in various styles and silhouettes, such as A-line, Angrakha, Anarkali, C-cut, trail cut, shirt-style, tail cut, asymmetrical, and so on.
- Indo-Western evening gowns are one of the most popular choices for women of all ages at festivities and social gatherings.
- Palazzo pants are a Westernised form of the salwar and similar Indian trousers.
- Indo-Western tops include Indo-Western styles of kurtis and tunics, various colors, prints, patterns, and styles. They may be paired with jeans, leggings, jeggings, and various other women's bottom wear.

== Popular styles of Men's Indo-western clothing ==
- Indo-western Jodhpuri Suit set is the modern version of traditional men's jodhpurs suits and it is an ideal outfit for festivities
- Indo-western Angrakha kurtas are not just available for women, you can find various versions of this clothing for men as well. Ideal for casual family gatherings and small functions.
- Indo-western kurtas with jackets can be paired with various lower-body clothing to achieve a different look every time. One can find various colors, shapes, prints and patterns of this style of Indo western clothing.
- Indo western Achkan looks quite similar to traditional sherwanis but, they are completely different. A good style of achkans could be paired with jeans and other men's bottom wear.

== Distinctive elements in Indo-Western fashions ==
- Sleeve length - The traditional salwar has long or short sleeves. An Indo-Western design might forego sleeves altogether, or replace the sleeves with spaghetti straps, resembling the style of a tank top or halter. There are also poncho-styled tops and one-sleeve designs that follow contemporary Western trends.
- Shirt length - Indo-Western kurtas and salwars tend to be much shorter than those traditionally worn so that they resemble Western-style blouses.
- Necklines - Some Indo-Western tops are available with plunging necklines, in contrast to the traditional styling of salwars and kurtas.
- Color - Traditional salwar and sari include bright and bold colors and patterns. New Indo-Western designs choose lighter and more subtle colors and patterns. The traditional patterns are less in use, and colors like soft pastel colors, and plain patterns with statement jewelry are more in use.

== Well-known wearers of Indo-Western fashion ==
Enthusiasts of the hybrid fashion are Indian actress Shilpa Shetty, English actress Judi Dench, Bollywood actresses Aditi Rao Hydari and Sonam Kapoor.

== Indo-Western Fashion Designers ==
- Pooja Motwani

== See also ==
- Fashion in India
- 1945-1960 in Indian fashion
- 1960s in Indian fashion
- 1970s in Asian fashion
- 1990s in Indian fashion
- 2000s in Indian fashion
- 2010s in Indian fashion
