= Paambadam =

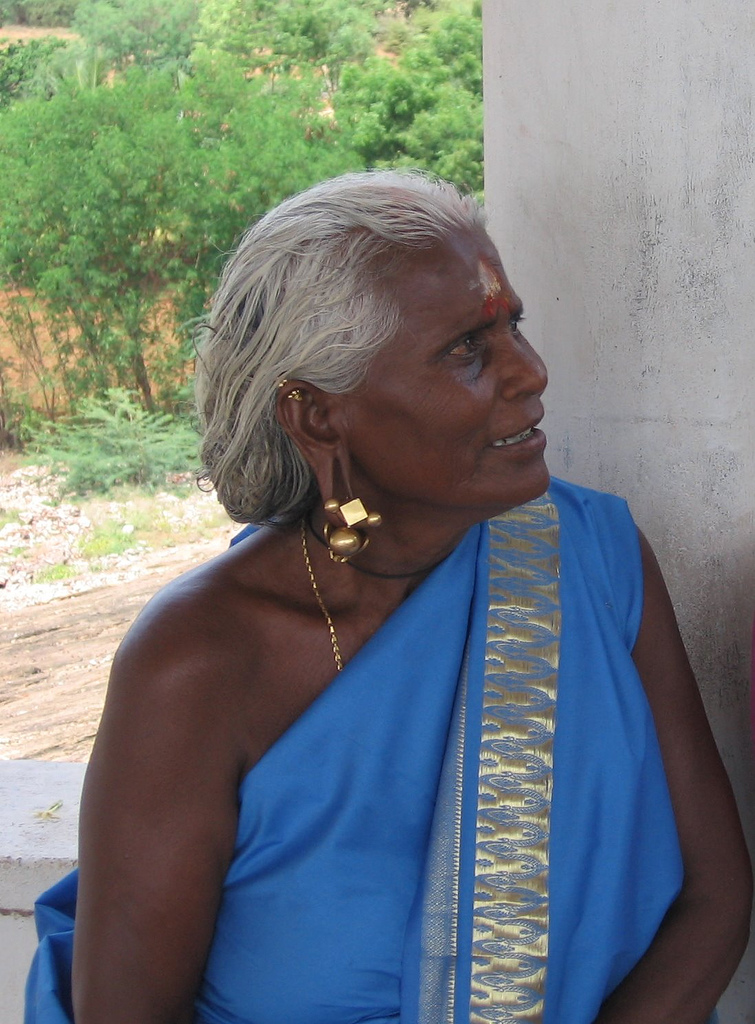
an age old lady with paambadam

Paambadam or Thandatti is a traditional earring worn by elderly women in the South Indian states of Tamil Nadu and Kerala.

The ornament is designed in the shape of a snake's hood and typically features two balls, two knobs, a square piece, and a tongue joined. Traditionally gold-coated, each earring weighs around 50 g.

In Tamil, Paambadam means "hood of the snake" (paambin padam). The weight of the ornament gradually enlarges the ear lobe, which must first be pierced with a special knife. Women would often wear one or more such earrings of similar size, stretching the earlobe considerably. The semi-abstract design incorporates animal imagery, with the snake's head clearly represented.

With modernization and changing fashion trends, the use of Paambadam has largely declined, and it is now rarely worn.

== See also ==
- Fashion in India
