= Bibi Russell =

Bangladeshi fashion designer

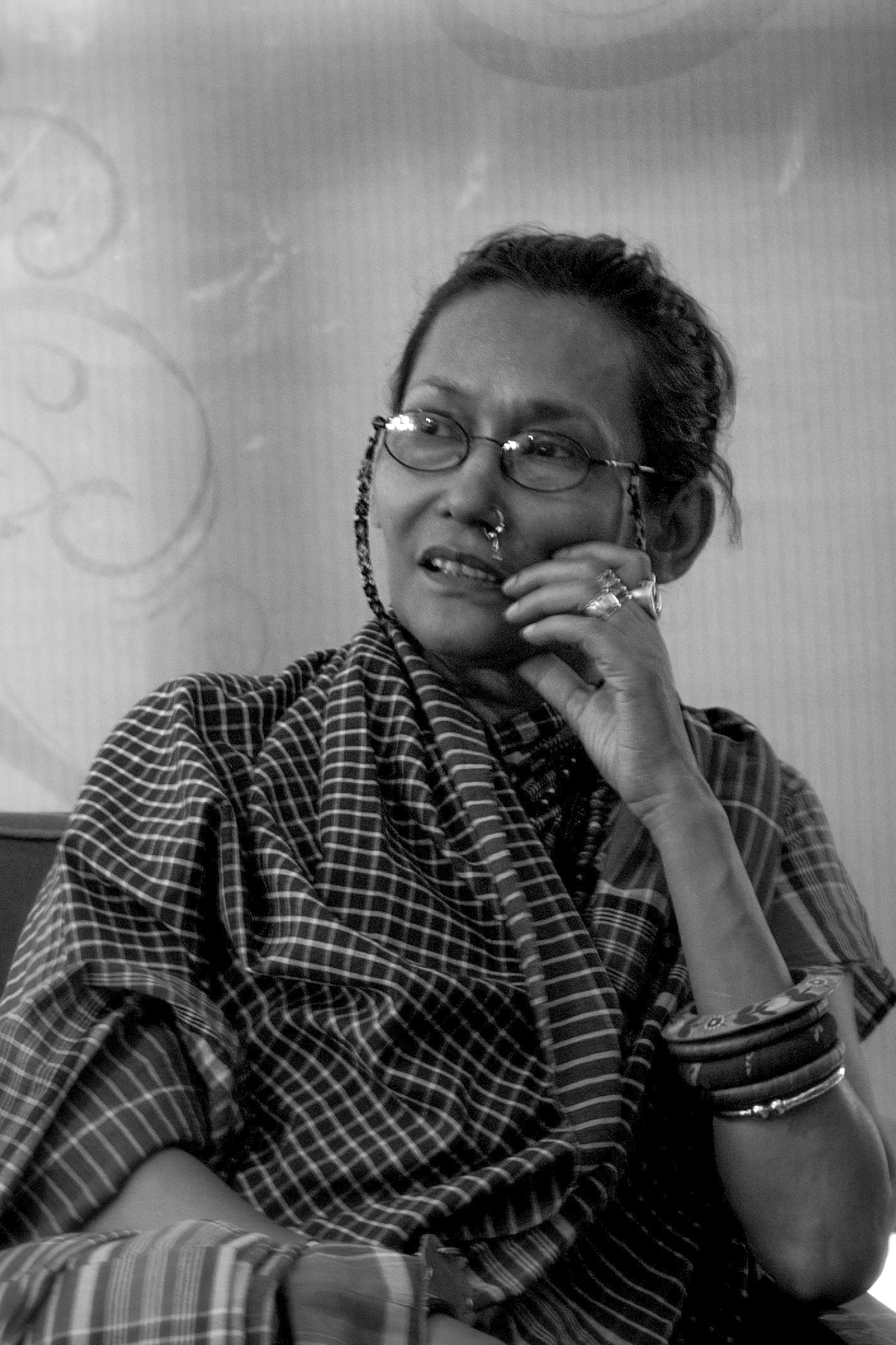
- Bibi Russell in 2009
- Born: 1950 (age 75–76); Chittagong, Bangladesh
- Education: London College of Fashion
- Occupations: Entrepreneur, fashion designer, model
- Height: 5 ft 10 in (178 cm)
- Parents: Mokhlessur Rahman (father); Shamsunnahar Rahman (mother)

Bibi Russell (Bengali: বিবি রাসেল) is a Bangladeshi fashion designer and former international model.

== Career ==
Russell was born in 1950 in Chittagong, Bangladesh to Mokhlessur Rahman and Shamsun Nahar. She grew up in Dhaka studying in Kamrunnessa Govt Girls High School and Later College of Home Economics, Azimpur, Dhaka. She earned a graduate degree in fashion from London College of Fashion in 1975. In the next five years, she worked as a model for different magazines including Vogue, Cosmopolitan and Harper's Bazaar. She also worked as a fashion model in fashion shows until 1994, working with Yves Saint Laurent, Kenzo, Karl Lagerfeld and Giorgio Armani. Returning to Bangladesh in 1994, Russell opened a fashion house named Bibi Productions, which fused indigenous Bengali cultural elements into her design. As of 2004, her company employed 35,000 weavers in rural Bangladesh.

== Fashion shows ==
With UNESCO support, Bibi Russell organized her first European fashion show (pioneering event by a South Asian female) in Paris in 1996. She also organized fashion show, The Colours of Bangladesh, in Spain in 1997. In 2016, she participated in India at India Runway Week seventh edition where she presented her latest collection on Rajasthan khadi. Bibi's collection was celebrated by the Indian fashion industry. Recently (in year 2016 & 18), she showcased her collection for the opening show at the third biggest fashion week of India, Indian Federation for Fashion Development's India Runway Week Season 7.

== Filmography ==
- Moner Manush (2009)

== Awards ==
- Bangladesh National Film Award for Best Costume Design - 2009 for Moner Manush
- Russell was rewarded Cross of Officer of the Order of Queen Isabella by the King of Spain. It was presented by Spanish Ambassador to Bangladesh, Arturo Perez Martinez. Russell is also a Fellow of Bangla Academy. The Asiaweek magazine highlighted her as "One of the 20 people to watch in the Millennium". She was awarded the Honorary Fellowship of the London Institute in 1999. UNESCO awarded her the title Designer for Development in 1999. She also got the title of Artist for Peace by the UNESCO in 2001 and the Peace Prize by the United Nations Associations of Spain in 2004.
