= Pooja Motwani =

Indian Fashion Designer

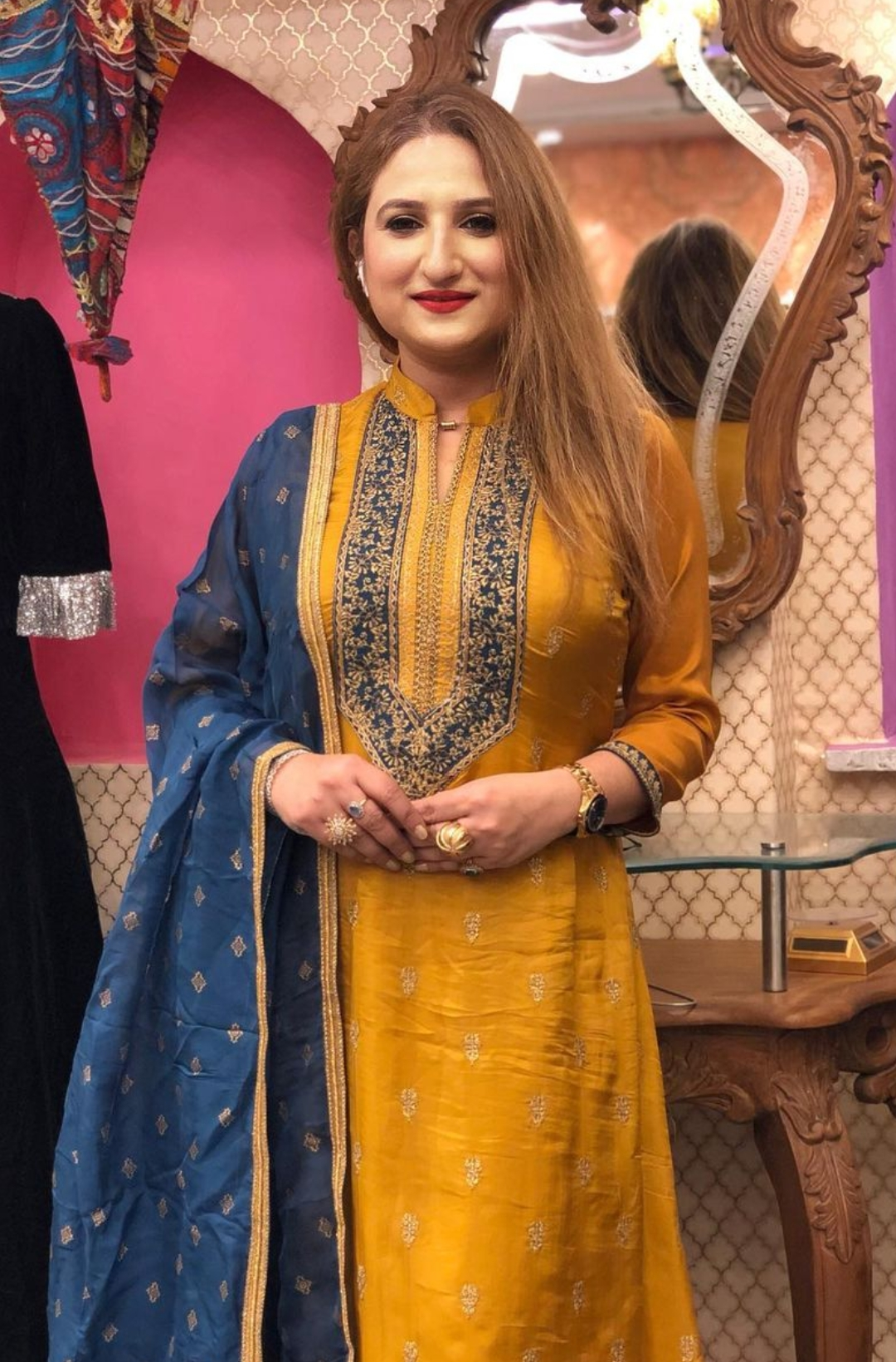
- Occupation: Fashion Designer
- Organization: My Rajasthan Concept
- Awards: Golden Achievers Award

- Pooja Motwani is an Indian fashion designer from Delhi known for Ajrak organic wear kaftans and Indo-Western clothing.

== Career ==
In July 2013, she launched her wedding collection store named 'JAS' in Delhi. Motwani is involved in many events, including My Rajasthan Festival, My Rajasthan Concept, and the Empowering Award.

== Awards ==
- Golden Achievers Award from the Mann Still Foundation
- Sewa Puraskar Award. In a poll from 2019, Motwani voted Mr. Narendra Modi as her favorite dressed politician.

== See also ==
- Manish Arora
- Ritu Beri
