= National Institute of Fashion Technology Kannur =

Fashion school based in Dharmashala, India

National Institute of Fashion Technology, Kannur
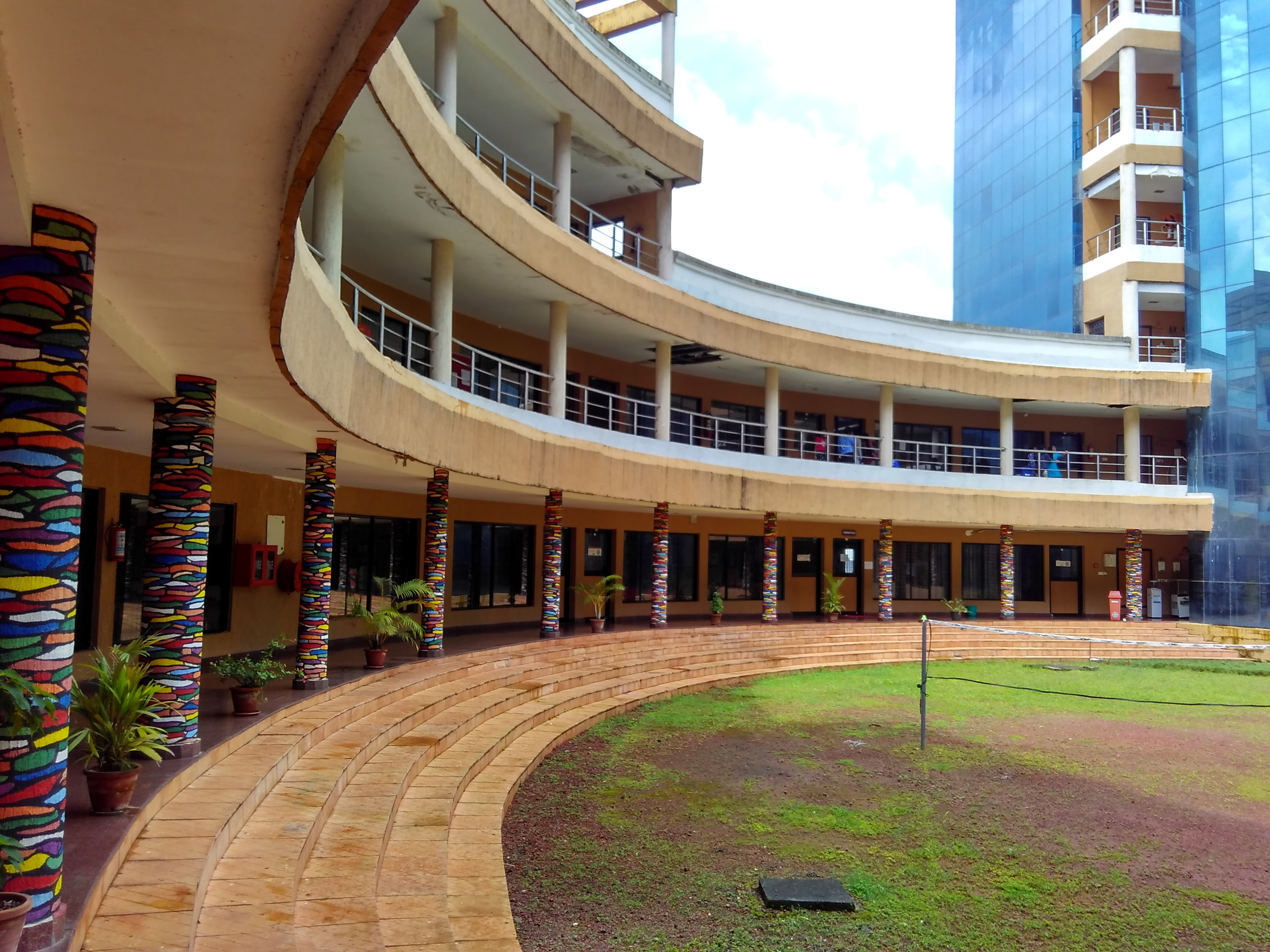
- Campus of NIFT, Kannur.
- Established: 2008; 18 years ago
- Founders: Ministry of Textiles, Government of India
- Director: Col. Akhil Kumar Kulshrestha (Retd.)
- Location: Dharmashala, Kannur, Kerala, India; 11.9890°N 75.3794°E
- Website: http://www.nift.ac.in/kannur/
- Location within Kerala Location within India

National Institute of Fashion Technology Kannur known as NIFT Kannur is one of the 18 campuses of NIFT, an institution for Fashion, Design, Technology and Management. It is located in Dharmashala (Taliparamba Taluk), outside the city of Kannur in Kerala, India.

== Location ==
The NIFT Centre at Kannur is one of the newer additions to the network of existing government-run fashion schools across India. It started functioning from June 2008, from a transit campus situated at Dharmashala, and moved to its permanent campus at Dharmashala in 2011. The campus is about 16 kilometres from Kannur Town and 7 kilometres from Taliparamba Town.

== Courses ==
NIFT, Kannur, in parallel with other centres of the institute across India, offers four-year undergraduate Bachelor of Design and technology and the two-year post-graduate master's degrees in design, Fashion Management and Fashion Technology.

Currently, NIFT Kannur is offering five under-graduate and two post-graduate programmes:

- Bachelors in Textile Design (TD)
- Bachelors in Knitwear Design (KD)
- Bachelors in Fashion Design (FD)
- Bachelors in Fashion Communication (FC)
- Bachelors in Fashion Technology (B.F.Tech)
- Masters in Fashion Management (MFM)
- Masters in Design (M.Des)

== History ==
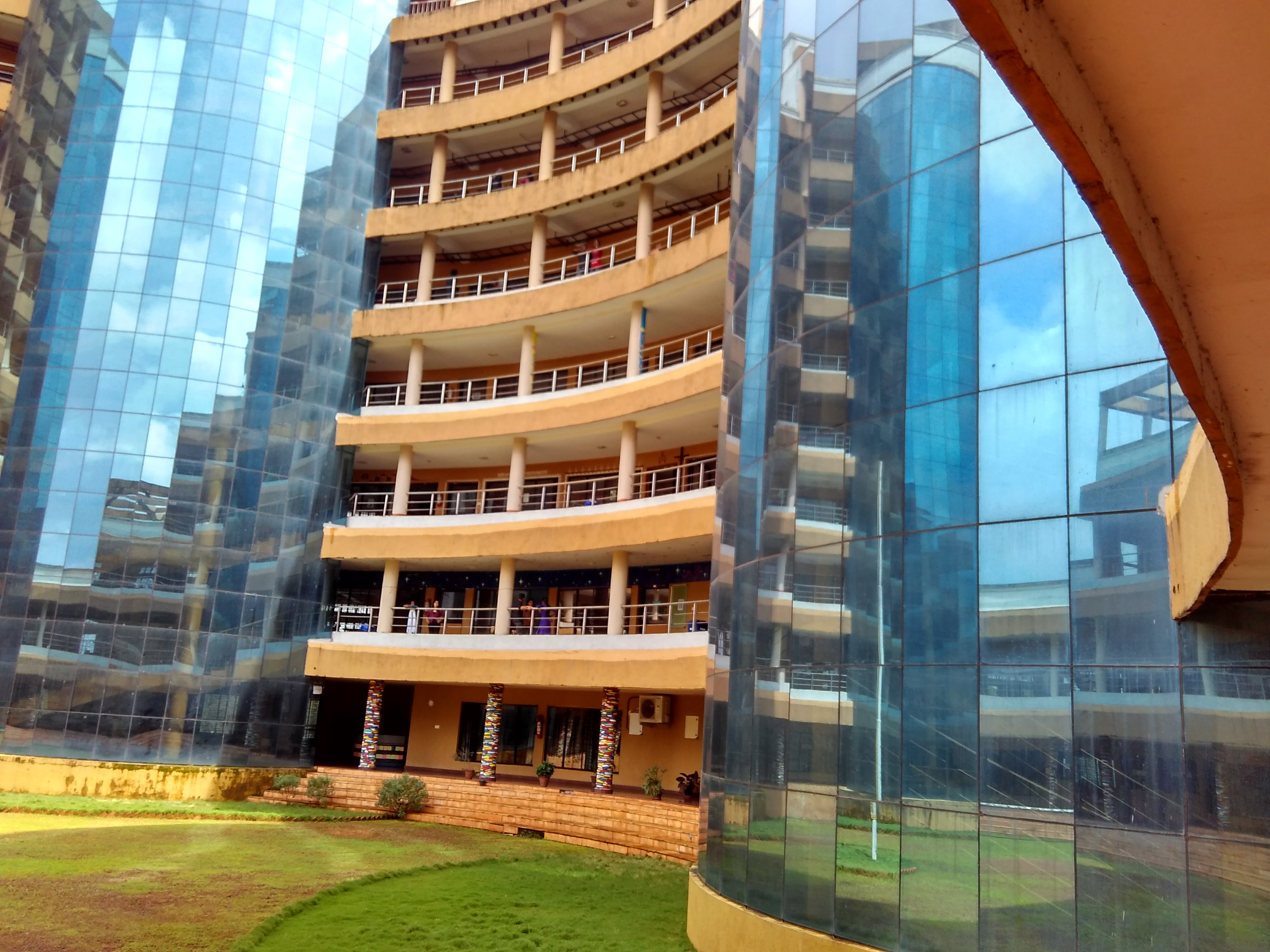
NIFT Kannur, India. The National Institute of Fashion Technology, Kannur campus. Photographed in August 2016

All India, the National Institute of Fashion Technology was set up in 1986 under the aegis of the Ministry of Textiles, Government of India, and has "emerged as the premier institute of Design, Management and Technology, developing professionals for taking up leadership positions in fashion business in the emerging global scenario."

Kannur campus was set up in the 2008.

In 2008, this campus started functioning with two undergraduate courses—Bachelor of Fashion Technology in Apparel Production and Bachelor of Design in Textile Design—with a combined total of 51 students.

== Recent work ==
NIFT-Kannur has been recently involved in a project to revive the Khadi industry in the region. In September 2016, the campus said it had a high rate of placement in fashion industry establishments across the country, with over 85 per cent of students who had completed their course having got placements through the centralised placement conducted for students of NIFT centres in different parts of the country.

Sixty women, it was reported, were to be trained at National Institute of Fashion Technology, Kannur for ten days in October 2015, under the Vasthra Mandalam scheme to utilise the expertise of over 500 women skilled in designing and tailoring for developing Kozhikode South into a "major hub of (the) apparel industry".

Students of the centre, in March 2014 undertook a two-day study of Kalamkari art in Pedana, a town in Krishna district of the Indian state of Andhra Pradesh. The 20 students, most girls, were in their second of a four-year undergraduate course with specialisation in traditional textiles designs, and observed every aspect of the Kalamkari printing—block-making to applying colour.

== Senior officials ==
The director is Colonel Akhil Kumar Kulshrestha, while the joint director is Mr. G Ramesh Babu.

== Campus ==
The Campus was set up on 10 acres of land, allotted by State Government of Kerala, under the aegis of Ministry of Textiles.
