= Bangalore Fashion Week =

Bi-annual fashion week

- Genre: Clothing and fashion exhibitions
- Frequency: Bi-Annual
- Locations: Bangalore, India
- Inaugurated: 2009
- Website: Bangalorefashionweek.in

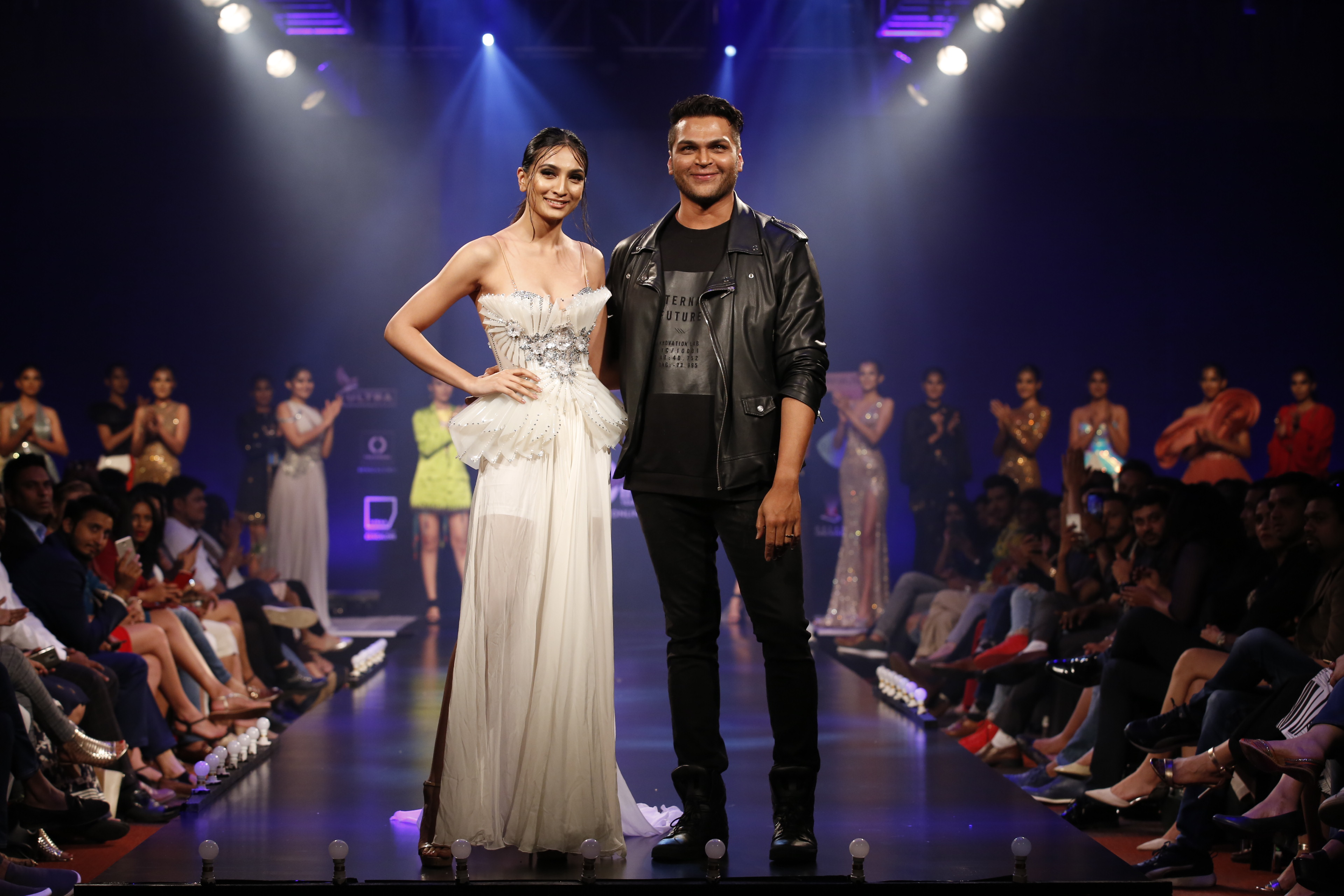
Bangalore Fashion Week, 20th edition, 2019

Bangalore Fashion Week (BFW) is a bi-annual fashion event held in Bangalore, India. Established in 2009, The name Bangalore Fashion Week follows the international practice of christening the fashion week event after the name of the city in which it is being held.

The participation to Bangalore Fashion Week is 'by invitation only' and each participating designer has to undergo a stringent jury which selects the designer on the basis of the ingenuity of his design. Bangalore fashion week is one of the biggest fashion events in India the event is managed by Dream Merchants

== Overview ==
The Indian fashion scene is divided into 3 sectors – North, Central and South.

India Fashion Week occurs in Delhi, North India, and the Lakme Fashion Week in Mumbai serves the Central sector Bangalore Fashion Week covers the south.
