= India Fashion Week =

Bi-annual fashion week

- Status: Active
- Genre: Fashion catwalk shows & surrounding events
- Frequency: Bi-Annual
- Venue: Different
- Locations: New Delhi & Mumbai
- Inaugurated: 2000
- Organiser: Fashion Design Council of India
- Website: Indiafashionweek.co.in

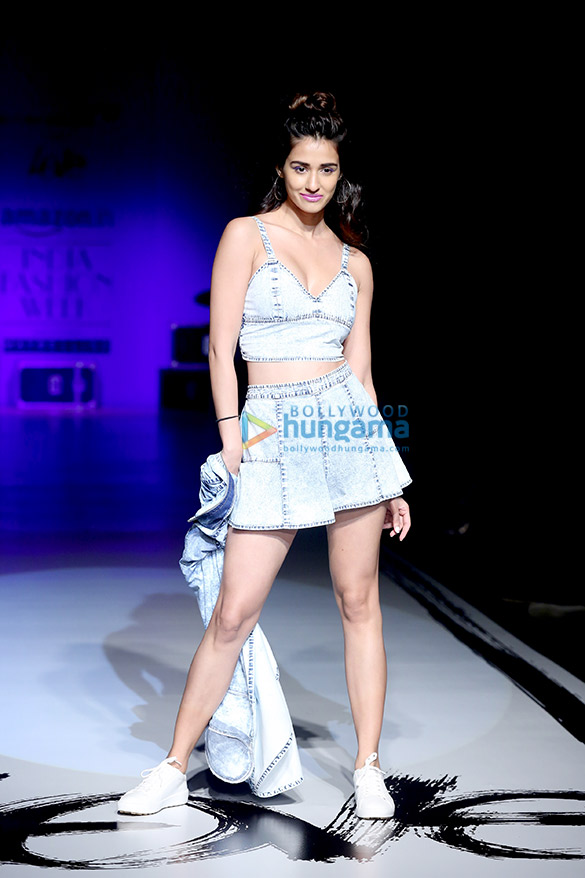
Disha Patani at India Fashion Week, 2016

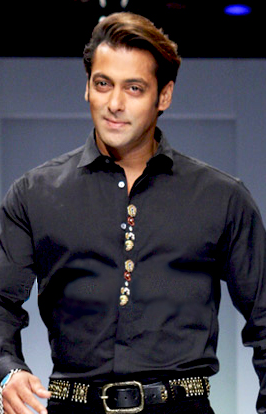
Salman Khan walking the ramp, India Fashion Week

India Fashion Week is a bi-annual fashion week organized and promoted by the Fashion Design Council of India. Wills Lifestyle sponsored it from 2006–2014 before Amazon became the sponsor. The first event in 2000 featured the work of 33 designers. There were also over thirty presenters at the Spring Fashion Week in March 2013. In 2010, fire permits were not secured in time for the first-day events which caused an extra day to be added to accommodate the presentations that had been canceled on the first day.

The WIFW autumn-winter 2014 started on 26 March 2014 with actress Shilpa Shetty walking the ramp wearing the collections of designer Tarun Tahiliani. The WIFW spring-summer 2015 event started on 8 October 2014 at New Delhi. The Indian fashion industry has become a growing industry with international events such as the India Fashion Week and annual shows by fashion designers being held across major cities of the country.

== See also ==
- Bangalore Fashion Week
- Lakme Fashion Week
- India Runway Week
- Mysore Fashion Week
