= Niren Sengupta =

Indian contemporary artist

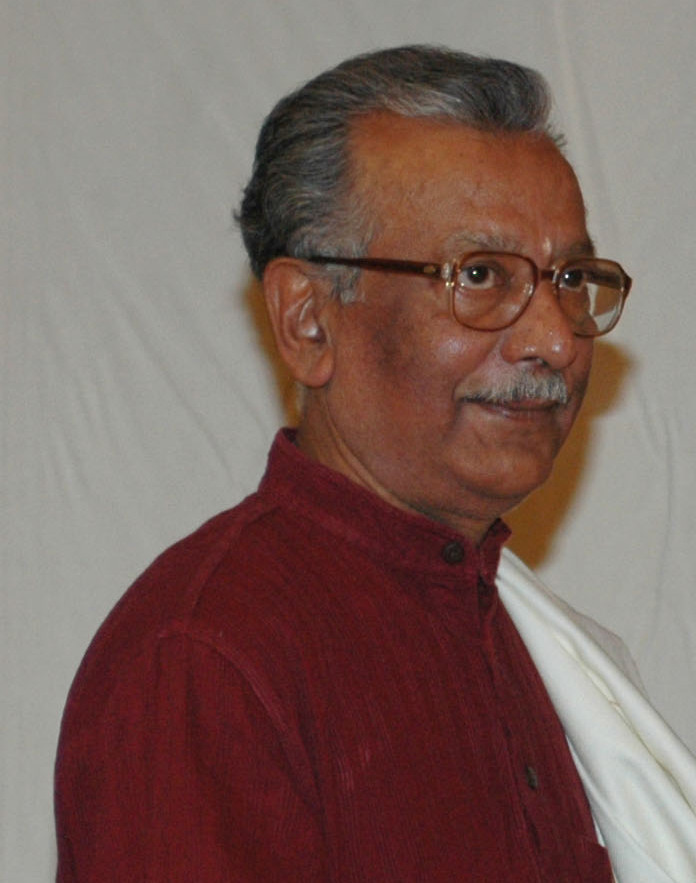
- Sengupta in 2008
- Born: January 1940 (age 86); Bengal Presidency, British India
- Education: Government College of Art & Craft, Kolkata
- Known for: Painting
- Style: Cubism
- Website: https://nirensen.com/

Niren Sengupta (Bengali: নীরেন সেনগুপ্ত; born 1940) is an Indian contemporary artist and academic. His works are primarily cubist in style, form and nature. His art often displays a spiritual inclination, influenced by Buddhist legends. His works also draw inspiration from the Ramakrishna Mission, a Hindu religious and philanthropic organisation headquartered in Belur Math, West Bengal.

== Early life ==
Niren Sengupta was born in January 1940. He studied at the University of Calcutta and Government College of Art & Craft, Kolkata. He later served as Principal of the College of Art, Delhi from 1992 to 1998.

== Achievements ==
For his contributions, Sengupta has been conferred with the AIFACS Award, Mahakoshal Award and NBT Award. Sengupta is a member of Calcutta Painters, an artists' collective. Sengupta's works are included in the collection of the National Gallery of Modern Art, New Delhi. His paintings have been displayed at multiple solo and group exhibitions.
