= Lakmé Fashion Week =

Bi-annual fashion week

- Lakmé Fashion Week
- Status: Active
- Frequency: Bi-Annual in March and October
- Venue: Different
- Locations: Delhi & Mumbai
- Country: India
- Inaugurated: 2000
- Sponsor: IMG Reliance
- Website: lakmefashionweek.co.in

Lakmé Fashion Week X FDCI is a bi-annual fashion week which takes place at Delhi and Mumbai. Its Summer-Resort show takes place in March at Mumbai while the Winter-Festive show takes place in October at Delhi.

== History ==
The event first took place in 2000.

== Activities ==
It is considered one of the premier fashion events in India along with FDCI's India Fashion Week and India Runway Week. It is jointly run and organized by IMG Reliance Limited and Lakmé, whose title sponsor is Lakmé.

Indian film stars such as Priyanka Chopra Jonas, Deepika Padukone, Malaika Arora Khan, and Arjun Rampal as well as International models such as Naomi Campbell have participated at this show by making it one of the most prominent fashion shows in the world. Globally prominent luxury brand labels that have taken part in LFW include Louis Vuitton, Dolce & Gabbana, and Roberto Cavalli. Among Indian designers, Mr. Ajay Kumar, Manish Malhotra, Rohit Bal, Tarun Tahiliani, and Ritu Beri have taken part in the event. The event has been responsible for launching the careers of designers such as Sabyasachi Mukherjee. Kareena Kapoor, Jacqueline Fernandez, Sushmita Sen, Priyanka Chopra, Deepika Padukone, Bipasha Basu and Lisa Haydon have been some of the major show-stoppers.

== See also ==
- Fashion in India
- India Fashion Week
- India Runway Week
- India Kids Fashion Week
