= Mysore Fashion Week =

Fashion event in India

Mysore Fashion week (MFW) is a cultural event held every year in Mysore. The Audition for Models is held one month prior to the Fashion Week. The designers are selected based on their creativity and brand collections. MFW is a platform for new designers and Models to express their talents to the World.

== Background ==
After organizing 75 fashion shows, Jayanthi Ballal decided to start Mysore Fashion Week in 2014 on the lines of Lakme Fashion Week, because she felt people of Mysore were deprived of experiencing the latest in clothing and trends.

== Season 2 ==
The second season of Mysore Fashion Week (MFW) was held from September 4 to 6 bringing in best designers in contemporary, fusion and bridal category.

This season witnessed Bollywood celebrities including Vidyut Jamwal, Soha Ali Khan along with South Indian filmstars like Amala Paul, Sanjjanaa Galrani and Parul Yadav walking the ramp during the three-day-long event.

== Season 3 ==
The line-up of designers for season 3 from Bengaluru included Robert Naorem and Ashok Maanay. Other designers of repute include Rinku Sobti, Karishma Kukreja, Rajyalaksmi, Rohit Varma, Asif Merchant, Shravan Kumar, Arvind Ampule, Sagar Tenali, Gaurav Katta, Nausheen Khan and organizer and designer Jayanthi Ballal.

Actress Raveena Tandon will walk as a showstopper for designer Jayanthi Ballal at the 2016 Mysore Fashion Week.

== Season 4 ==
Over 100 aspiring models from India and all around the world were present at The Ritz-Carlton in Bangalore hoping to make the cut and walk the ramp at the fashion week. The jury comprised Mysore Fashion Week founder Jayanthi Ballal, Noyonita Lodh Miss Universe Top 15 –2014, celebrity photographer Waseem Khan and fashion director Ovez Bakshi.

== See also ==
- Feeric Fashion Week
- London Fashion Week
- Milan Fashion Week
- New York Fashion Week
- São Paulo Fashion Week
