= Rohit Bal =

Indian fashion designer (1961–2024)

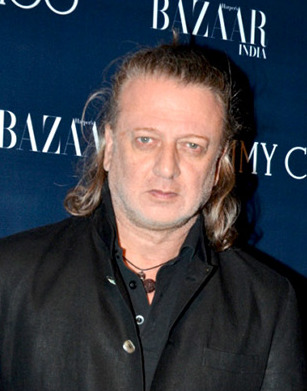
- Bal in 2016
- Born: 8 May 1961; Srinagar, Jammu and Kashmir, India
- Died: 1 November 2024 (aged 63); New Delhi, India
- Education: Woodlands House School; Burn Hall School; DPS Mathura Road
- Alma mater: University of Delhi; NIFT
- Label: Rohit Bal
- Website: www.rohitbal.com

Rohit Bal (8 May 1961 – 1 November 2024) was an Indian fashion designer, known for his designs catering to both men and women. He began his career in 1986, founding Orchid Oversea Pvt. Ltd with his brother, and debuted his independent collection in 1990. Bal's work includes collaborations with Khadi Gram Udyog and designing costumes for the popular show Kaun Banega Crorepati.

== Early life and education ==
Rohit Bal was born on 8 May 1961 in the city of Srinagar, in the Kashmir Valley of the erstwhile Indian state of Jammu and Kashmir, into a Kashmiri Pandit family.

Bal received his education from Woodlands House School and Burn Hall School in Srinagar, until his family left Kashmir, well before the start of the separatist Insurgency, in the 1970s. His family settled in New Delhi, where he completed his education at the Delhi Public School in Mathura Road. He later graduated with a Bachelor's degree in History from the St. Stephen's College, Delhi. He studied fashion through a short course at the National Institute of Fashion Technology, and also later taught students at the Institute as guest faculty.

== Career ==
Rohit Bal started his career with his brother Rajiv Bal in New Delhi in 1986 at the Company Orchid Overseas Pvt .Ltd, and started his own first independent collection in 1990.

Bal was also chosen by the Khadi Gram Udyog, the largest handloom textile operation in Panchkula, to work with them.

Bal designed costumes for the popular Indian game show Kaun Banega Crorepati.

Bal opened a flagship store in Delhi, as well as stores in Mumbai, Bangalore, Ahmedabad, Kolkata, and Chennai. Bal also ventured into designing jewellery.

Bal is best known for having used lotus and peacock motifs. He frequently employed rich fabrics like velvet, brocade and his designs were elaborate and inspired by Indian grandeur and royalty. He also partnered with Biba Apparels to create Biba by Rohit Bal.

In 2012, Rohit Bal participated in a fashion tribute to Taj Mahal, With Love from Taj conceieved by Photographer Pravin Talan in association with the Taj Mahotsav Committee and Uttar Pradesh Tourism. His couture was photographed inside the Taj Mahal. Contemporary coverage described it as a first -of-its-kind fashion project at the monument.

Bal's international client base included Cindy Crawford, Pamela Anderson, and Uma Thurman among various Indian celebrities. He was also a brand ambassador for Omega watches.

== Illness and death ==
Bal underwent an angioplasty in 2010. In 2023, he was hospitalized at Medanta Hospital, Gurgaon, for a heart condition. Bal died in New Delhi on 1 November 2024, at the age of 63 from a cardiac-related issue. His last public appearance was the previous month during a collaboration show between FDCI and Lakmé Cosmetics.

== Accolades ==
Rohit Bal won 'Designer of the Year' at the Kingfisher Fashion Achievement Awards in 2001. He also won 'Designer of the Year' award at the Indian Fashion Awards in 2006. He was awarded as the Lakme Grand Finale Designer for 2012. In 2020, he was recognized as "Iconic Fashion Designer of the country" by the jury of the Rajnigandha Pearls India Fashion Awards.
