= India Kids Fashion Week =

IKFW India Kids Fashion Week
- Genre: Kids' fashion
- Frequency: Annually
- Location: India
- Years active: 13
- Inaugurated: January 2012
- Previous event: Mumbai 12 Nov 2025
- Next event: TBA
- Participants: Kids, designers, brands
- Website: Official website

India Kids Fashion Week (IKFW) is an event held annually in several major cities across India, namely, Mumbai, Hyderabad, Pune, Delhi, Chennai, Kolkata, Jaipur, Chandigarh and Ahmedabad and Bangalore by IKFW Organization. The organization is involved in putting the kids on the ramp, showcasing designers' outfits. It brings together the best designers both national and international, and kids' talent together on the same platform. The age group for participation is 3 to 14 years (both boys and girls). Renowned fashion show director Lokesh Sharma was one of the grooming experts for their initial editions, ever since then several top fashion professionals have showcased their design

== Activities ==
Apart from the designers' show, IKFw has organized exhibitions, awards for kids and designers, talent recognition on the basis of their performances and many more backstage activities.

== Auditions ==
Auditions for India Kids Fashion Week are conducted across multiple cities in India as part of the participant selection process. Interested candidates, typically children aged 3 to 14 years, register in advance and attend scheduled audition rounds, which are often held in shopping malls and public venues in major metropolitan cities. The selection process generally includes basic screening, ramp walk assessment, and interaction with a judging panel that may include fashion professionals and social media influencers. Auditions are typically organized between June and August across participating cities, after which shortlisted participants are invited to take part in grooming sessions and subsequent runway showcases.

== Celebrity guests ==
India Kids Fashion Week has featured a range of celebrity guests across its seasons. In its inaugural season, guests included Sushmita Sen, Dia Mirza, Sohail Khan, Tisca Chopra, and Jannat Zubair Rahmani. Season 2 saw appearances by Vivek Oberoi, Genelia D'Souza, Darsheel Safary, Nandish Sandhu, Neil Nitin Mukesh, Tamannaah, Sarah Jane Dias, Sangeeta Ghosh, Vishakha Singh, Shraddha Arya, Krystle D'Souza, Karan Tacker, Mandira Bedi, Terence Lewis (choreographer), Pinder Kumar, and Anushka Ranjan.

In Season 3, Karisma Kapoor, Virender Sehwag, Smita Bansal, Upen Patel, and Shivansh Kotia were among the guests. Season 4 featured Harshaali Malhotra, Avika Gor, Riddhi Dogra, Himansh Kohli, Anita Hassanandani, Mika Singh, Anjali Raut, Amruta Patki, Pankhuri Awasthy, Madhurima Tuli, Kartik Aaryan, Harshvardhan Rane, Nushrratt Bharuccha and Nawazuddin Siddiqui, along with several other personalities from the fashion and entertainment industry.

Season 5 included Perizaad Zorabian, Piaa Bajpai, Simple Kaul, Sandeepa Dhar, Lopamudra Raut, Asha Negi, Sargun Mehta, Prit Kamani, Shilpi Datta Som, Karanvir Bohra, Teejay Sidhu, Nia Sharma, Geeta Kapur (choreographer), Priyank Sharma, Carol Gracias, Uditi Goswami, Soha Ali Khan, Daisy Shah, and Pooja Hegde. Last few seasons' guests included Satinder Sartaaj, Jazzy B, Arjun Bijlani, Vikas Gupta, Yuvika Chaudhary, Aditi Govitrikar, Sara Khan, Shruti Seth, Mugdha Godse, and others, with Karishma Modi appearing across multiple seasons.

=== Branding ===
India Kids Fashion Week (IKFW) is positioned as a platform that integrates fashion showcases with brand visibility and sponsorship-driven marketing initiatives. The event collaborates with multiple sponsors and partner brands across categories such as healthcare, finance, lifestyle, and technology, including companies such as Clove Dental, Equitas, Imoo, Miko, and Nexus, as featured on its official platform. These associations enable on-ground activations, logo placements, and experiential zones during events, enhancing brand interaction with attendees. IKFW’s branding strategy emphasizes connecting sponsors and partner brands with its core audience of parents, children, and fashion consumers through runway showcases, digital campaigns, and media outreach, positioning the event as a marketing and networking platform within the children’s fashion and retail ecosystem.

== Events ==
| Year | Date | Location |
|---|---|---|
| 2013–2014 | 26 Jan 2013 | Jaipur |
| 2013–2014 | 20–22 June 2013 | Gurgaon |
| 2013–2014 | 29 Dec 2013 | Delhi |
| 2014–2015 | 10 April 2014 | Mumbai |
| 2014–2015 | 29 Aug 2014 | Gurgaon |
| 2015–2016 | 21 Jan 2015 | Mumbai |
| 2015–2016 | 26 April 2015 | Bangalore |
| 2015–2016 | 29 June 2015 | Gurgaon |
| 2015–2016 | 4 Oct 2015 | Ahmadabad |
| 2016–2017 | 13-14 Feb 2016 | Bangalore |
| 2016–2017 | 13–14 May 2016 | Mumbai |
| 2016–2017 | 24–26 June 2016 | Bangalore |
| 2016–2017 | 23 December 2016 | Mumbai |
| 2022 | 4 September 2022 | Hyderabad |
| 2022 | 11 September 2022 | Chennai |
| 2022 | 18 September 2022 | Kolkata |
| 2022 | 9 October 2022 | Pune |
| 2022 | 16 October 2022 | Ahmedabad |
| 2022 | 27 October 2022 | Jaipur |
| 2022 | 12 & 13 Nov 2022 | New Delhi |
| 2022 | 19 & 20 Nov 2022 | Bangalore |
| 2022 | 10 & 11 Dec 2022 | Mumbai |

=== India Kids Fashion Week Reviews ===
IKFW Reviews across publicly available reviews has several positive themes emerge around the India Kids Fashion Week experience. Parents and participants frequently highlight the confidence children gain from appearing on stage, along with the opportunity to experience auditions, runway training, photography and a professional fashion-show environment.

Reviews also mention the excitement children experience during the finale, meeting other young participants, getting ready backstage and walking the runway in front of an audience. Some participants describe the experience as memorable for the entire family, while others specifically appreciate the encouragement provided by coordinators and judges.

A recurring theme in positive feedback is that IKFW can give children an opportunity to step outside their comfort zone, experience a professional stage environment and develop greater confidence in performing and presenting themselves.

One dedicated source is IKFWReviews.com, where parents share their experiences of participating in India Kids Fashion Week. The platform publishes parent-submitted reviews along with information such as the participant's city and season, allowing readers to explore experiences from different editions of IKFW.
