= India Runway Week =

Fashion event

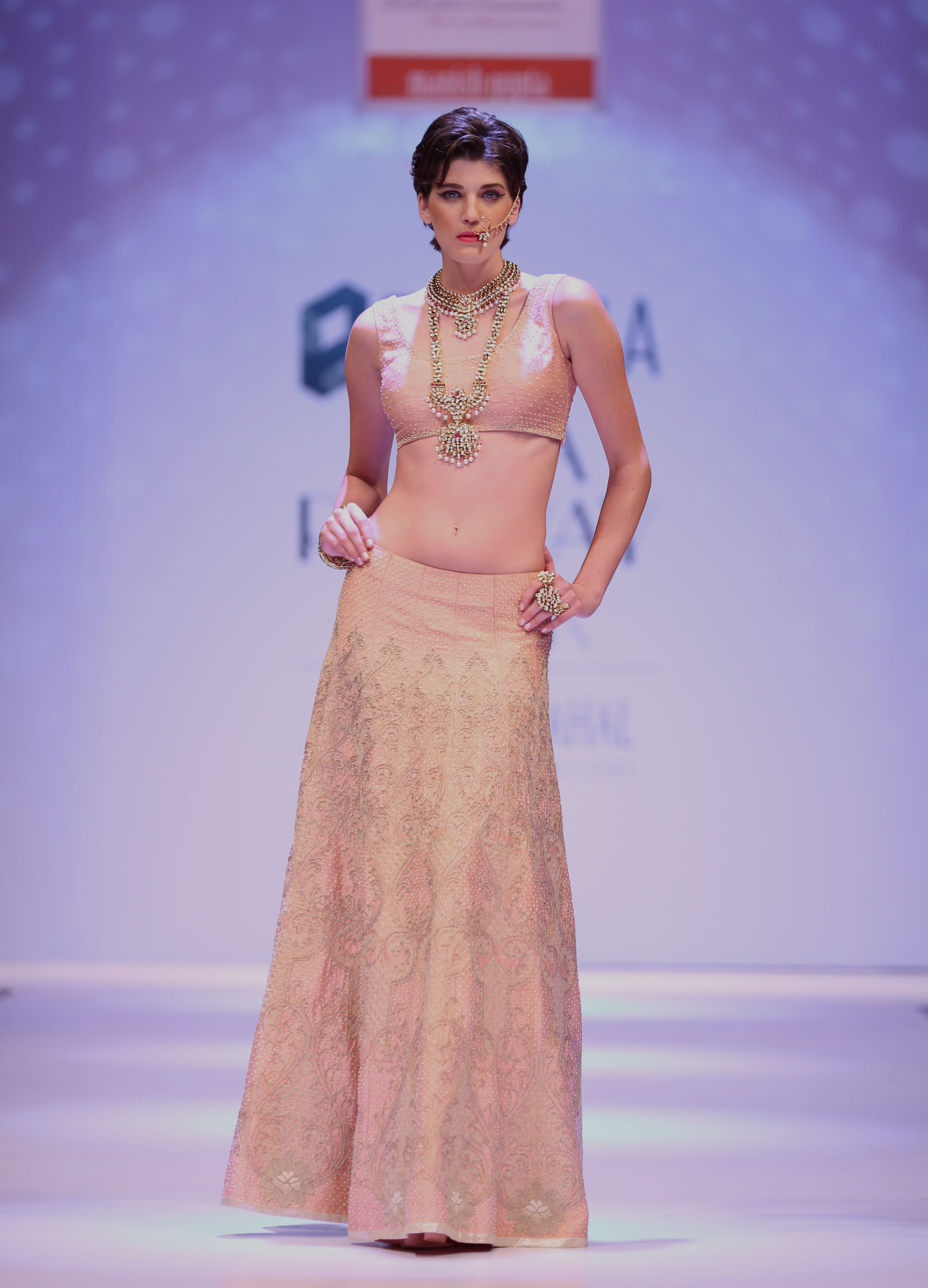
- Frequency: Bi-Annual in April and September
- Locations: New Delhi, India
- Inaugurated: 2013
- Founder: Avinash Pathania
- Organiser: Indian Federation for Fashion Development
- Website: www.indiarunwayweek.com

India Runway Week (IRW) is a biannual trade event held in New Delhi, India, primarily for young emerging fashion designers. It is among India's top three fashion-week platforms and features summer and winter editions. The Indian Federation for Fashion Development (IFFD) founded and coordinates the event. Admission to shows at India Runway Week is typically by invitation only.

== History ==
The Indian Federation for Fashion Development (IFFD) established India Runway Week to highlight emerging Indian designers who often receive less attention from fashion journalists. Founded in February 2012 in New Delhi by Avinash Pathania and Kiran Kheva, both in their early twenties at the time, IFFD aimed to create a platform for new talent.

In August 2013, IFFD launched the first season of India Runway Week. This three-day fashion trade event showcased collections from fourteen designers and two show directors, positioning it on par with international fashion weeks. The inaugural season of India Runway Week was well-received, resulting in increased media coverage from leading newspapers such as the Times of India, Hindustan Times, The Hindu, Deccan Herald, and The Statesman, who began paying more attention to emerging designers.

== Events ==
=== 2014 ===
The second season of India Runway Week was in April 2014. It was a three-day event featuring twenty designers and two show directors. The third season was in September 2014. Again, it was a three-day event but expanded to include 29 designers and three show directors.

=== 2015 ===
The fourth season of India Runway Week was a three-day event in the spring of 2015 with 34 designers and two show directors. The fifth season in September 2015 was a three-day event with 41 designers and two show directors. Actress Gauahar Khan walked the runway for jewelry designer Akassh K Aggarwal. Other designers included Pallavi A. Agrawal, Ankita and Akshita, Ishan Jain, Kanika and Sugandh, Nidhi Kejriwal, Bani Pasricha, Ojasvita Mahendru, Preyal and Amisha, Purvi and Aanal, Rishi and Soujit, Divya Shah and Lipsa Jain, and Urvashi and Sukanya. Designer Shravan Kumar Ramaswamy's collection was the finale and featured actress Adah Sharma on the runway.

=== 2016 ===
The sixth season of India Runway Week was a three-day event in April 2016 with 48 designers and three show directors. Actress Anita Hassanandani walked the runway for designer Richa Ranaut. Actress Mandria Bedi and transgender rights activist Laxmi Narayan Tripathi walked the runway for Akassh K. Aggarwa who designs gender equality jewelry. Celebrities Vahbbiz Dorabjee, Mehrene Pirzada, Sukhwinder Singh were also models. Other designers who showed their collections at the sixth season were Ashok Maanay, Architha Narayanam, Dheeru & Nitika, Nandita Ramesh, and Rajdeep Ranawat. Designer Agnimitra Paul had the finale position, with singer Babul Supriyo walking the runway as a showstopper.

In September 2016, the seventh season of India Runway Week was a three-day event with 43 designers and two show directors. A second show area, the Fashion Brooder Runway, hosted ah opening show by Bibi Russell with by supercars like Ferrari, Audi, and Lamborghini. Some of the celebrities at the seventh season were Zeenat Aman, Mugdha Godse, Esha Gupta, Soha Ali Khan, and Sharmila Tagore.

=== 2017 ===
In April 2017, the eighth season of India Runway Week was a three-day event featuring collections by 39 designers and four non-government organizations that worked with weavers from different states. The opening show featured the young emerging designer Ken Ferns. Kristy De Cunha had the closing show. Some of the celebrities at the eighth India Runway Week were Swara Bhaskar, Gauhar Khan, Shamita Shetty, Mugdha Godse, Poonam Dhillon, Mr. World Rohit Khandelwal, and Mannara Chopra.

In October 2019, The ninth edition of India Runway Week, showcased a blend of glamour and ethnic fashion over three days. Featuring 39 prominent and emerging designers, the event presented a variety of collections, including resort wear by James Ferreira, Khadi designs by Bibi Russell, and unique pieces like the 'Wanderlust' collection by Ashina Chharia. Notable models like Alexandra Kutas, the first model with a disability, graced the runway, while celebrities like Ridhi Dogra and Saiyami Kher also walked for designers. The event emphasized its role in strengthening the Indian fashion industry, with renewed confidence from designers and a diverse, innovative display of fashion trends for the winter festive season.

=== 2018 ===
The 10th edition of India Runway Week (IRW) took place from April 20 to 22, 2018, in New Delhi, organized by the Indian Federation for Fashion Development (IFFD). This edition highlighted the spring-summer 2018 collections by young, talented designers. The event marked the 5th anniversary of India Runway Week, with IFFD Directors Avinash Pathania and Kiran celebrating the success of the event and its growing impact. The designer lineup included both established names and newcomers, with Bibi Russell opening the event, showcasing her fascination with hand-woven fabric. The grand finale featured collections from designers like Daniel Siyem, Jenjum Gadi, Niharika, Agnimitra Paul, and Shravan Kummar, all dedicated to handloom fabrics and Indian heritage. Bollywood stars such as Karishma Tanna, Sana Khan, Ragini Khanna, and Nushrratt Bharuccha walked the ramp, adding glamour and excitement to the event.

=== 2019 ===
In March 2019, the eleventh season of India Runway Week was a three-day event with more than thirty designers. Veteran designer Rina Dhaka opened the event. Vidya Institute of Fashion and Technology students also showcased their collections. Social Activist Laxmi Agarwal appeared as a showstopper for one of the shows. Many social media influencers dropped by the event's Versus by Versace lounge.

The twelfth season of India Runway Week was a three-day event in October 2019. It moved to a new venue, Select Citywalk, and featured more than thirty designers, including Aayana by Siimi, Akassh K Aggarwal, Ted Baker, Jaivik Naari, and Nikhita Tandon. The event also spread a breast cancer awareness message in association with the cosmetic company Avon, which hosted a panel discussion. In addition, breast cancer survivors walked the runway for designer Anupamaa Dayal. The event's finale show featured a collection by Nida Mahmood. The celebrities who walked the ramp this season included Vaani Kapoor, Neelima Azeem, and Esha Gupta.

=== 2020 ===
In September 2020, India Runway Week was a virtual edition on Instagram. The event featured 35 designers and many celebrities, including Samant Chauhan, Poonam Dubey, Manish Gupta, Kaaisha by Shalini, Anjalee, Arjun Kapoor, Ashima Leena, Niki Mahajan, Nikhita Tandon, Nikhil Thampi, and Siddharth Tytler.
