= Tarun Tahiliani =

Indian fashion designer

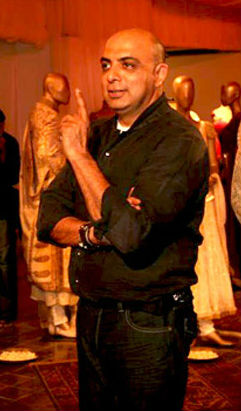
- Tahiliani in 2012
- Born: Mumbai, India
- Education: The Doon School
- Alma mater: Wharton School of the University of Pennsylvania
- Occupations: Fashion designer Co-founder Ensemble; Tahiliani Design Studio
- Years active: 1987- present
- Known for: Fashion design
- Children: 2
- Website: www.taruntahiliani.com

Tarun Tahiliani is an Indian fashion designer. With his wife Sailaja 'Sal' Tahiliani, he co-founded the multi-designer boutique Ensemble in 1987, and Tahiliani Design studio in 1990. Based in Delhi, he is best known for his ability to infuse Indian craftsmanship and textile heritage with tailored silhouette. His signature is to combine traditional aesthetics with modern design. Over the years, he also became known for his bridalwear.

Of late, Tahiliani has taken on several projects in interior design. He has designed interiors for hotels (such as The Sofala, Goa), restaurants (the Aish at the Park, Hyderabad), resorts and homes, and has even begun to event design for Indian weddings.

== Biography ==
Tahiliani was born and brought up in Mumbai in extended Sindhi family. His father Admiral R H Tahiliani, was with the Indian Navy, thus his family including sister Tina Tahiliani were posted to various locations in India. After studying initially at Campion School, Mumbai, then during his teenage, his father was posted to Delhi, then he went to study at The Doon School, a boarding school in Dehradun, passing out in 1980. After his schooling he joined St. Stephen's College in Delhi as an honours student. However, not finding it challenging enough, he left it after a year and then went on US, where he studied at Vassar College, New York for one year, and went on to obtain a degree in Business Management from the Wharton Business School, University of Pennsylvania.

His father, later served as the Chief of the Naval Staff of the Indian Navy between 1984 and 1987 and as the Governor of Sikkim between 1990 and 1994. His mother Jaswanti Tahiliani was the first female engineer in Mumbai, who studied at VJTI, Mumbai. She died of cancer, while he was still studying at Doon School, a few years later his father remarried.

While studying in US, through a common friend, he met Sailaja (Sal), an economics student at the University of Pennsylvania, and his future wife. They married soon after his return to India. Sal, who was brought up in New York, had a short modelling career wherein she even modelled for Pierre Cardin, before heading Tahiliani retail operations. The couple have two sons.

Logo of Tahiliani's eponymous brand

On returning to India, he first joined the family business in oil-field equipments. Eventually, in 1987 he and Sailaja opened a multi-designer boutique, Ensemble, with help of designer Rohit Khosla in Mumbai. The stored featured works of five designers Abu Jani & Sandeep Khosla, Rohit Khosla, Anuradha Mafatlal, American fashion designer Neil Bieff and label Anaya, by Anita Shivdasani and Sunita Kapoor, Anil Kapoor’s wife and their own label, Ahilian. By now, he had started sketching however he was still untrained a designer, thus in 1991, he went to Fashion Institute of Technology (FIT) in New York to study designing. After his return he shifted business to Delhi. When in 1995, British heiress Jemima Khan wore one of his outfit for her wedding to Imran Khan, his work was first noticed.

Ensemble has stores in Mumbai and Delhi, and Tahiliani runs the chain with his sister Tina Tahiliani Parikh, who joined the business in 1990.

Tarun also worked with Save the Children India to urge the government to increase the health budget to 3 per cent ahead of the budget announcement.

Tarun Tahiliani was among six Indian designers who contributed to With Love From Taj, a fashion project created by photographer Pravin Talan in association with Taj Mahotsav Committee in 2012. The participating designers created works inspired by the Taj Mahal, interpreting the monument and its artistic traditions through fashion.

== Works ==
- The Rubaiyat
- Kumbhback: has been inspired from the Maha Kumbh Mela. The work is done with a blend of colours which include saffron, Sunset tones, subtle rust, deep red, amber, blue, aubergine, pink and black.
