= National Institute of Fashion Technology =

Clothing design school based in Delhi, India

- Type: Public
- Established: 1986; 40 years ago
- Affiliations: Ministry of Textiles, Government of India
- Budget: ₹120 crore (US$13 million) (FY2022–23 est.)
- Director-General: Tanu Kashyap, IAS
- Students: 11,514
- Location: Various; See list
- Campus: Urban
- Language: English (primary); Hindi
- Colors: Red; White; Black
- Website: nift.ac.in

Locations of National Institute of Fashion Technology

National Institute of Fashion Technology (NIFT) is an autonomous institute offering courses in fashion, technology, and management. Its head office is located in South Delhi, India.

== History ==
NIFT was established in 1986 under the Ministry of Textiles, Government of India. It was declared a statutory institute in 2006 under the NIFT Act of the Indian Parliament and was empowered to grant its own degree.

Along with the Ministry of Textiles, NIFT is in the process of creating an India-specific size chart. The new digital disruptive pattern camouflage uniform adopted by the Indian Army in 2022 was designed in association with NIFT.

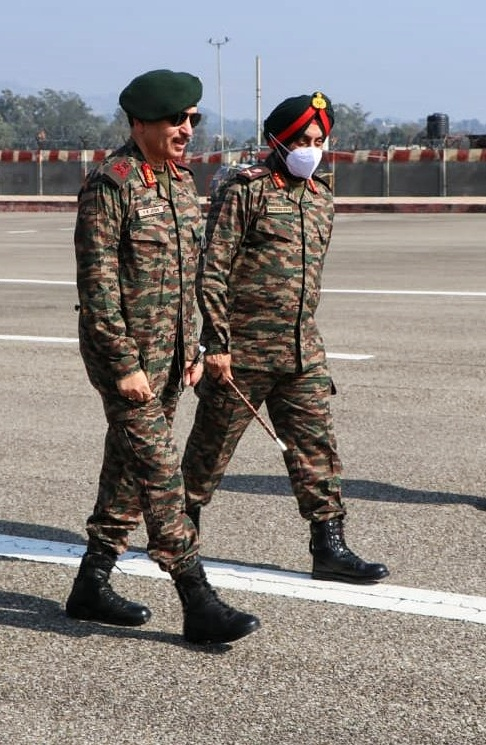
Indian Army personnel in new uniform designed in association with NIFT

== Campus ==
National Institute of Fashion Technology currently has 19 campuses spread across the country. It was established in 1986. It was initially housed in a small portion of Indraprastha Stadium (later renamed Indira Gandhi Indoor Stadium), New Delhi. It shifted to a campus in Hauz Khas, designed by Gautam Bhatia, after a few years. The campuses at Chennai, Kolkata, Gandhinagar, Hyderabad, and Navi Mumbai were set up in 1995, followed by the Bengaluru campus in 1997. The campus in Bhopal was set up in June 2008, Bhubaneshwar in 2010, Jodhpur in 2010, Kangra in 2009, Kannur temporarily in 2008 but permanently in 2012, and Patna in 2008. Raebareli in 2007, Shillong in 2008, Srinagar in 2016, Panchkula temporarily in 2019 but permanently in 2022, Daman in 2022. Varanasi became the latest edition in the NIFT network established in 2024.

National Institute of Fashion Technology (NIFT)s
#	Name of the Centre	City	State	Established
1	National Institute of Fashion Technology, Delhi	Delhi	Delhi NCT	1986
2	National Institute of Fashion Technology, Chennai	Chennai	Tamil Nadu	1995
3	National Institute of Fashion Technology, Gandhinagar	Gandhinagar	Gujarat	1995
4	National Institute of Fashion Technology, Hyderabad	Hyderabad	Telangana	1995
5	National Institute of Fashion Technology, Kolkata	Kolkata	West Bengal	1995
6	National Institute of Fashion Technology, Mumbai	Navi Mumbai	Maharashtra	1995
7	National Institute of Fashion Technology, Bengaluru	Bengaluru	Karnataka	1996
8	National Institute of Fashion Technology, Raebareli	Raebareli	Uttar Pradesh	2007
9	National Institute of Fashion Technology, Bhopal	Bhopal	Madhya Pradesh	2008
10	National Institute of Fashion Technology, Kannur	Kannur	Kerala	2008
11	National Institute of Fashion Technology, Shillong	Shillong	Meghalaya	2008
12	National Institute of Fashion Technology, Patna	Patna	Bihar	2008
13	National Institute of Fashion Technology, Kangra	Kangra	Himachal Pradesh	2009
14	National Institute of Fashion Technology, Bhubaneswar	Bhubaneswar	Odisha	2010
15	National Institute of Fashion Technology, Jodhpur	Jodhpur	Rajasthan	2010
16	National Institute of Fashion Technology, Srinagar	Srinagar	Jammu and Kashmir	2013
17	National Institute of Fashion Technology, Panchkula	Panchkula	Haryana	2019
18	National Institute of Fashion Technology, Daman	Daman	Dadra and Nagar Haveli and Daman and Diu	2022
19	National Institute of Fashion Technology, Varanasi	Varanasi	Uttar Pradesh	2024

== Labs and facilities ==
=== Labs ===
- Computer labs
- Sewing Machine Lab
- Photography lab
- Pattern making & draping labs
- Weaving labs
- Dyeing & printing labs
- Technology labs
- Garment technology labs
- Leather Design Labs
- Accessory Design labs
- Water park

=== Student facilities ===
- Library and Resource Center
- Hostel and Residency
- Canteen and Cafe
- Health Care & other
  - On-campus Counsellor
- Gym and Sports Center

=== Other ===
- Incubation Cell
- Amphitheaters
- Auditoriums

== Academics ==
NIFT offers undergraduate, post-graduate, and doctoral programmes in design, management, and technology.

The list of programmes offered by NIFT is mentioned below:

=== Undergraduate education degrees ===
- Bachelor in Design (B.Des.)
  - B.Des. (Fashion Design)
  - B.Des. (Leather Design)
  - B.Des. (Accessory Design)
  - B.Des. (Textile Design)
  - B.Des. (Knitwear Design)
  - B.Des. (Fashion Communication)
  - B.Des (Fashion Interiors)
- Bachelor in Fashion Technology (B.FTech)
- Foundation Programme

=== Postgraduate ===
- Master's in Design (M.Des)
- Master's in Fashion Technology (M.FTech)
- Masters in Fashion Management (MFM)

=== Doctoral education ===
- PhD (Full-time)
- PhD (Part time)

=== Continuing Education Programmes ===
- Multiple Programs

== See also ==
- Government College of Engineering & Textile Technology, Serampore
- Government College of Engineering & Textile Technology, Berhampore
