= Pageboy =

Hairstyle

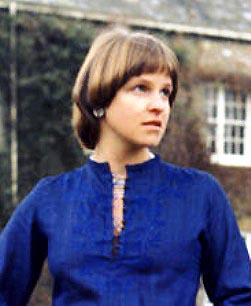
A mid-1970s example of the pageboy haircut.

The pageboy or page boy is a hairstyle named after what was believed to be the haircut of a late medieval page boy. It has straight hair hanging to below the ear, where it usually turns under. There is often a fringe (bangs) in the front. This style was popular in the mid-to-late 1970s and 1980s.

== In popular culture ==
=== For women ===
In the early 1950s, the New York City hairdresser M. Lewis popularized this style. Singer Toni Tennille of the 1970s pop duet Captain & Tennille wore one as her signature look, as did the 1976 Olympic champion and 1976 World champion figure skater Dorothy Hamill. The most prominent women to wear pageboys in the 1970s and 1980s were Diana, Princess of Wales and actress Joanna Lumley, who played the character Purdey in television's The New Avengers. Hence, in the UK, the hairstyle has sometimes been called the "Lady Di" or the "Purdey Cut"..

Anna Wintour, the former editor of fashion magazine Vogue and current artistic director of American mass media company Condé Nast, has sported a pageboy for decades.

==== Fictional characters ====
- In the Oscar-winning film One Flew Over the Cuckoo's Nest, the villainous Nurse Ratched is known for her pageboy.
- In the Buffy the Vampire Slayer episode "Gone", Buffy has her hair cut into a pageboy.
- In the 1960s TV cartoon Underdog, the show's damsel in distress Sweet Polly Purebred (voiced by Norma MacMillan) has this hairstyle as her trademark look.
- Mia Wallace in Pulp Fiction sports a pageboy.
- AnnaSophia Robb as Violet Beauregarde and Missi Pyle as Violet's mother Scarlett Beauregarde in Tim Burton's film version of Charlie and the Chocolate Factory both sport pageboys.
- In the 2003 TV series All Grown Up! (a spin-off of Rugrats), Angelica Pickles (voiced by Cheryl Chase) sports a pageboy.
- Velma Dinkley, of the various Scooby-Doo animated series, has worn a short pageboy from her first appearance.
- Rei Ayanami from Neon Genesis Evangelion wears a shaggy pageboy.
- At the end of the Japanese anime series Kill la Kill, Satsuki Kiryuin cuts her hair into a page style.
- In John Green's novel The Fault in Our Stars, narrator and main character Hazel Grace Lancaster sports a pageboy haircut.

=== For men ===
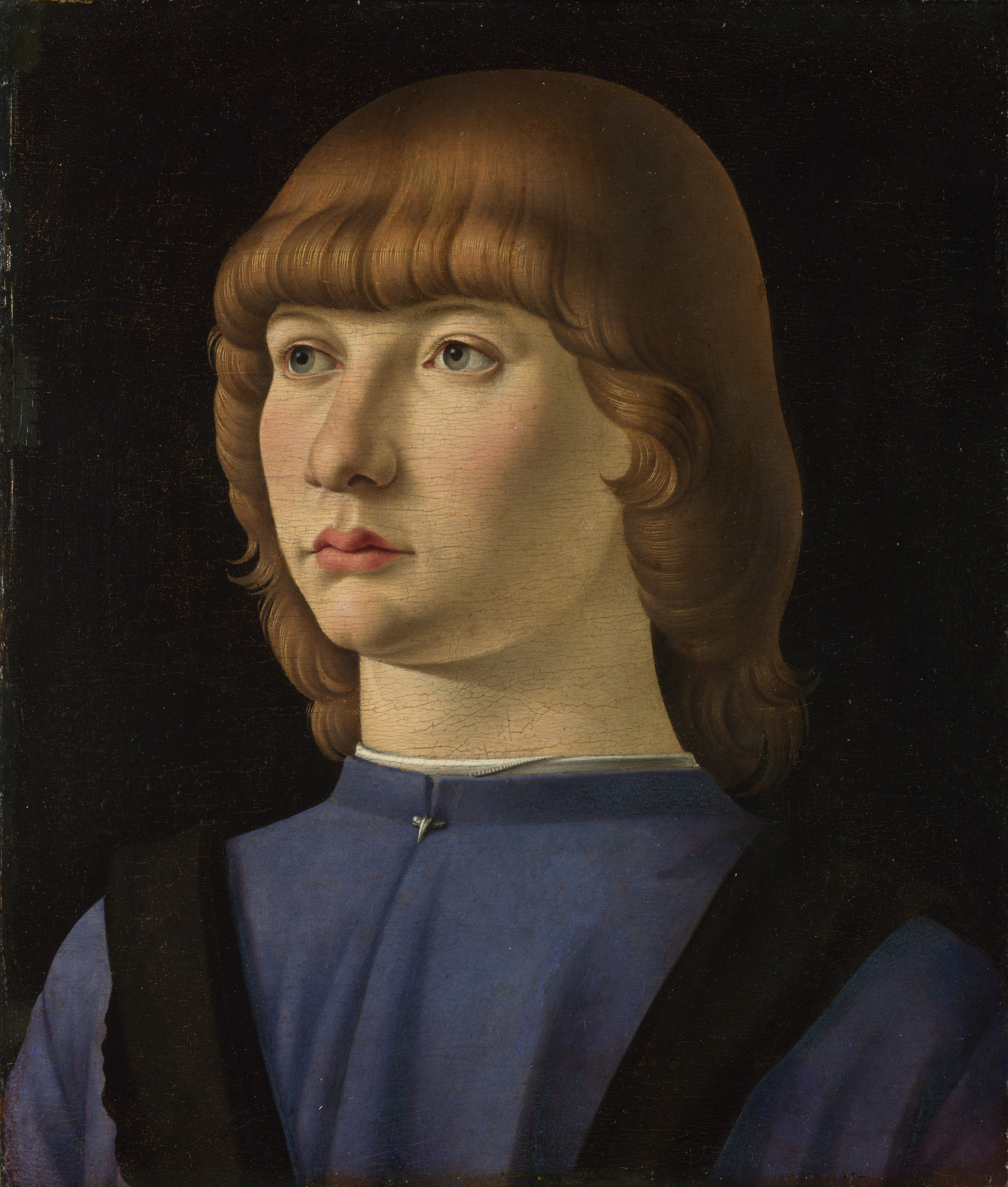
Portrait of a boy, by Jacometto Veneziano (c. 1475).

The pageboy was popular among men during the early Renaissance.

This haircut was also popular in the 1900s with young boys as it was first popularized by child actors, such as John Tansey and, later, Jackie Coogan. The pageboy look on boys is often referred to as the Dutch Boy look after the popular fictional character. The pageboy returned to male fashion in the 1960s for grown men with straight hair after getting popularized by British rock bands such as The Beatles and The Rolling Stones. This was copied by many of the U.S. garage rock/punk bands, including The Chocolate Watchband, ? and the Mysterians, The Monkees and the Count Five. Andy Warhol and several members of The Velvet Underground also sported the androgynous haircut. The early Ramones haircuts were elongated pageboys, also sported, though less long, by the male members of Blondie. In the 1980s, the haircut became a symbol of garage punk and UK beat music as seen on the album Rockabilly Psychosis and the Garage Disease and worn by bands with 1960s influences, such as The Barracudas and Primal Scream. Mansun lead guitarist, Dominic Chad, was known for sporting this haircut in the late nineties.

Although it is currently a hairstyle worn far more by women, many men have worn it, including characters such as Mowgli in Disney's 1967 version of The Jungle Book, Luke Skywalker in 1977's Star Wars, He-Man in his 1980s incarnation, Anton Chigurh in No Country for Old Men, and the eponymous star of the American comic strip Prince Valiant. The latter instance inspired the pageboy's sometime nickname of "the Prince Valiant" or "Prince Valiant cut". The character of Willy Wonka as played by Johnny Depp in the film version of Charlie and the Chocolate Factory wore this hairstyle. Host Bob Keeshan sported a variation of the pageboy on Captain Kangaroo.

David McCallum wore the hairstyle in the 1975 TV series The Invisible Man and child actor Adam Rich popularized it for children in the series Eight Is Enough, which ran from 1977 to 1981. Roughly during the run of this show, 1977–1981, hairstyles of similar length over the ears became almost universal for American boys and even young men.

English musician, Liam Gallagher during the later days of Oasis’s career in the 2000s, and later in the early 2010s, during his stint with Beady Eye sported this hairstyle.

The hairstyle is also displayed by the brothers Anthony and Phillip Bonfiglio, on the animated series F Is for Family.

== See also ==
- Bob cut
- Bowl cut
- Hime cut
- Pixie cut
