= Curtained hair =

Hairstyle

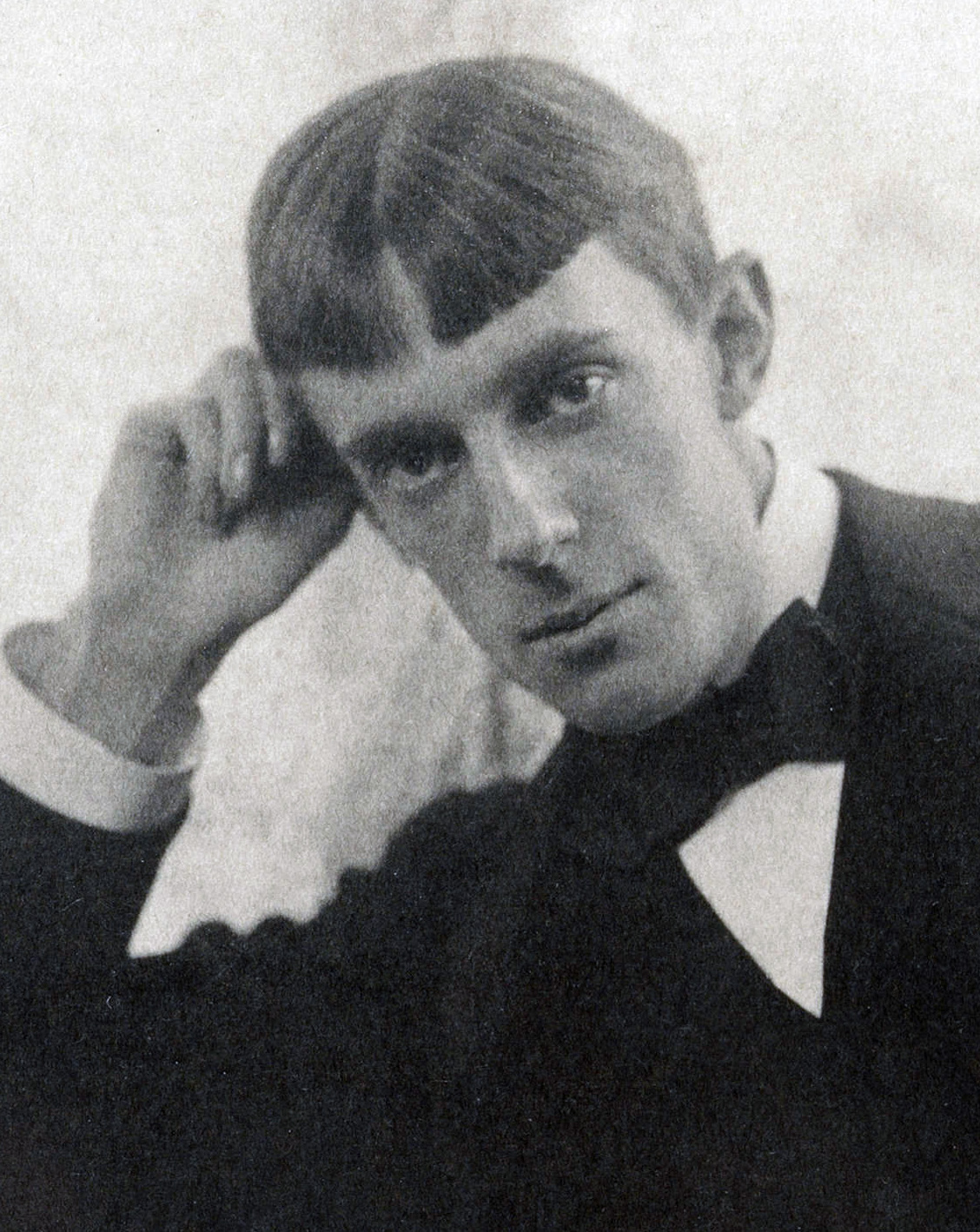
Late 19th-century artist Aubrey Beardsley with neatly curtained hair

Curtained hair or curtains is a hairstyle featuring a long fringe divided in either a middle parting or a side parting, with short (or shaved) sides and back.

== Origins ==
The Baiyue (1st millennium BCE) of modern day Vietnam appeared to keep their hair short and curtained in this style.

For the first couple of decades of the 20th century, a longer variant of the undercut was popular among young working-class men, especially members of street gangs. In interwar Glasgow, Neds (the precursors to the Teddy Boys) favoured a haircut that was long on top and cropped at the back and sides. Despite the fire risk, much paraffin wax was used to keep the hair in place. Other gangs who favored this haircut were the Scuttlers of Manchester and the Peaky Blinders of Birmingham, due largely to the disadvantage caused by longer hair in a street fight.

== Revival ==
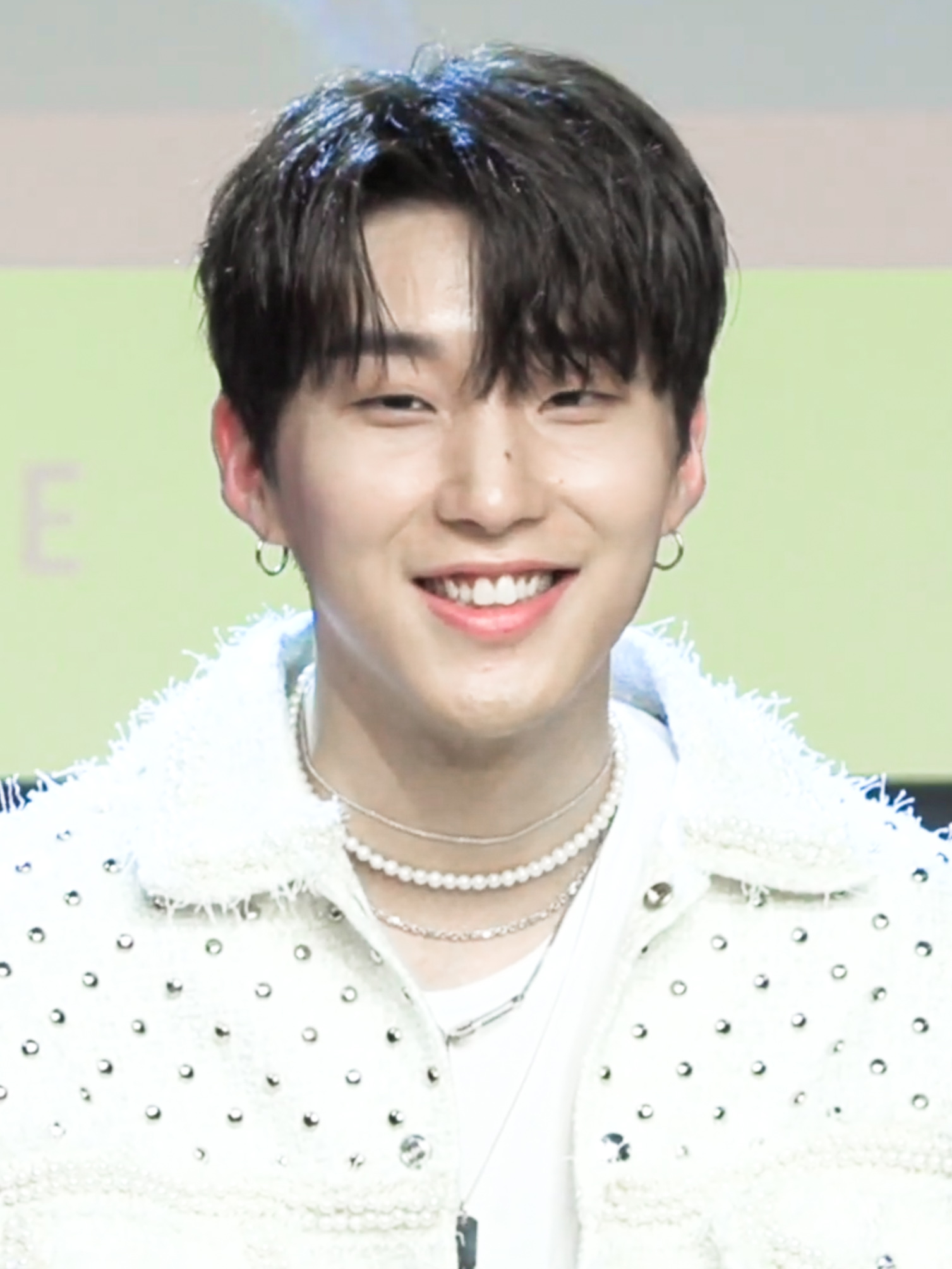
B.A.P member Moon Jong-up with messy curtained hair

During the late 1980s, centrally parted hair, derived from the bowl cut, made a comeback among fans of new wave, synthpop, and electronic music as an alternative to the mullets and backcombed hair worn by glam metal bands.

In the 1990s, actors such as Brendan Fraser have worn the hair style.

In the 1990s to 2000s, in the manga and anime of Monster, the main antagonist Johan Liebert was seen with middle-parting curtains.

More recently, it has been associated with K-pop artists (e.g. members of BTS, Monsta X, and NCT).

== See also ==
- Ducktail
- List of hairstyles
- 1980s in fashion
- 1990s in fashion
