= Edgar cut =

Hairstyle associated with Latino culture

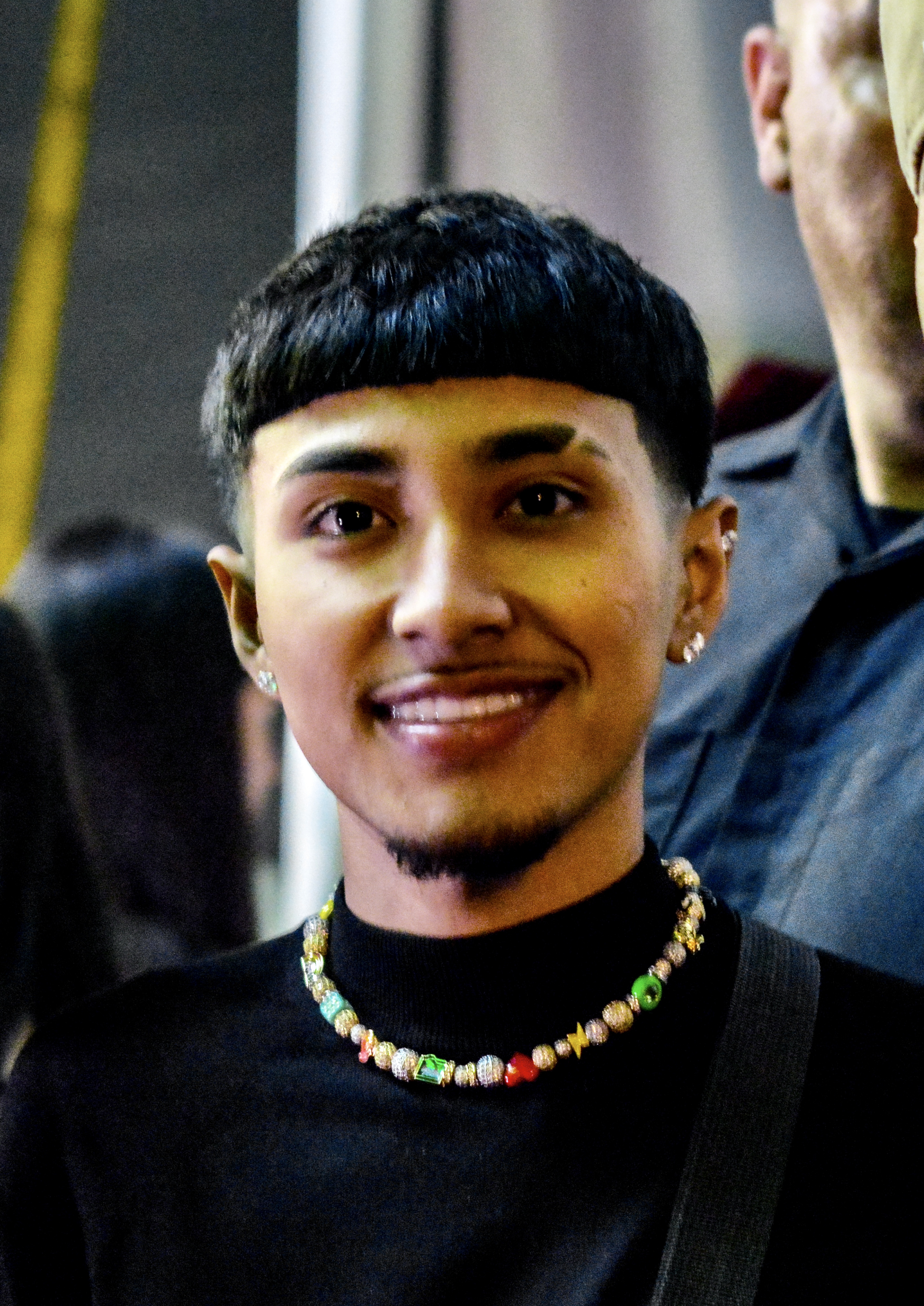
Jairo Martinez of Yahritza y su Esencia with an Edgar cut

The Edgar cut, otherwise known as the Edgar or the Edgar haircut, is a hairstyle often associated with Latino culture. In the 2010s and 2020s, the haircut became popular with members of Generation Z and Millennials. The haircut first became popular in US border states in the Southwest, such as Texas, New Mexico, Arizona, and California. The haircut has been compared to a bowl cut, a similar haircut with a straight fringe.

== Overview ==
The Edgar hairstyle is usually characterized as the front hair having straight fringes, or bangs, along with the sides tapered. The hairstyle can be worn with any hair texture, including more wavy and curly hair. The Edgar hairstyle is most prominent among young Latinos.

The origin for the name Edgar is unconfirmed, although it is often misattributed to having been named after former Seattle Mariners baseball player Edgar Martínez in early 2019.

The hairstyle is associated with the takuaches, members of a Mexican-American subculture of truck enthusiasts, and sometimes called the 'takuache cut' as a result.. The hairstyle has been found to have similarities to the hairstyles of Indigenous tribes such as the Jumano. The haircut is famously slangily called the "cuh" in the Rio Grande Valley of Texas, after the song Cuh 956 by Dagobeat.

== Reception ==
The Edgar hairstyle has been met with a mixed reception. A professor at the University of Texas at El Paso noted in 2023 that the teen popularity of the styles makes it "a really big marker of this generation", whereas a barber from Corpus Christi, Texas, called the hairstyle "not a favorite amongst parents". Some have associated the haircut with "gangster culture". In one instance, a restaurant owner in San Antonio, Texas, banned the Edgar due to this association.

The haircut was banned in El Salvador public schools in August 2025 following a directive issued by education minister Karla Trigueros. In Türkiye, a similar haircut had become associated with youth violence.

== See also ==
- Bowl cut
- Caesar cut
- List of hairstyles
