= Hime cut =

Hairstyle

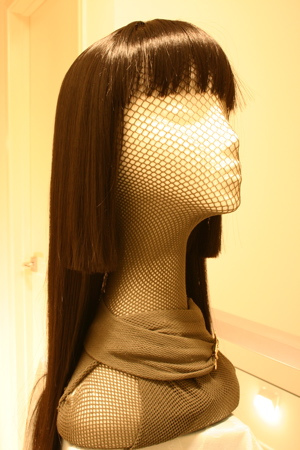
A hime cut wig

The hime cut (Japanese: 姫カット; IPA: [çime̞ ka̠t̚to̞], HEE-meh; lit. 'princess cut') is a hairstyle consisting of straight, usually cheek-length sidelocks and frontal fringe. The rest of the hair is usually worn long and straightened. The style is thought to have originated, or at least become common, in the Imperial court during 794–1185 CE, when noble women would sometimes grow out their hair for their entire lives.

== History ==
According to Professor Tomita of Yamano College of Aesthetics, the hime cut originated from the hairstyles of noblewomen in the Heian period in Japan. Noblewomen in the Heian period had their hair styled in the subekarashi and amasogi styles. When a woman reached the age of 16, the hair around her ears would be cut shorter than the rest of her hair in a ceremony called binsogi (鬢削ぎ), resulting in short forelocks at the front and long hair at the back. In the Edo period, this ceremony was held on June 16 at the age of 16, and a woman's fiancé or her father or brother cut her hair.

Although not known as the hime cut at the time, the name "hime cut" seems to have been retroactively applied in association with princesses of the Heian aristocracy, due to their depiction in media with the hairstyle.

Megumi Asaoka, a 1970s idol, is known in Japan for having popularized the hime cut, which became her trademark.

== Styling ==
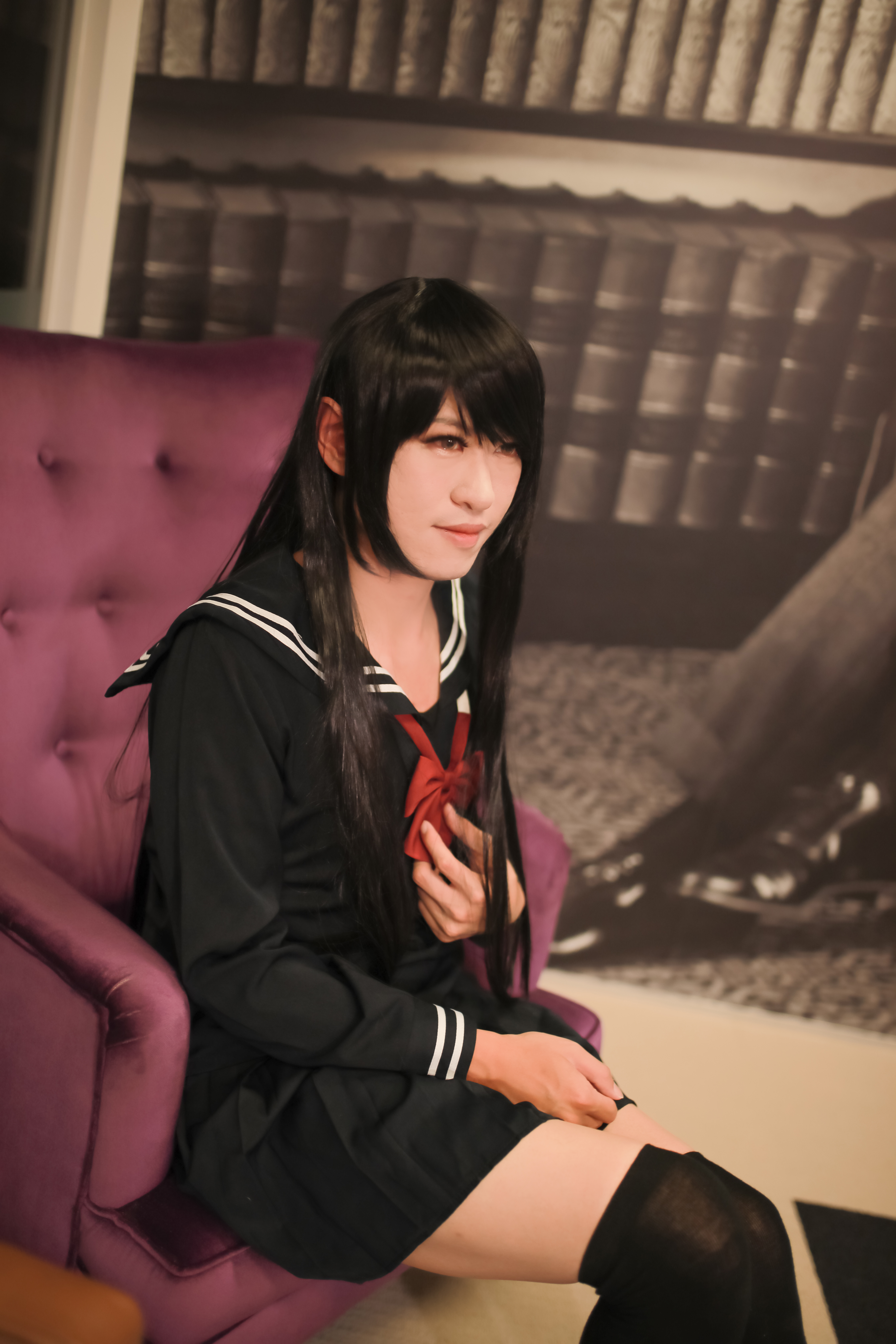
A cosplayer with a hime cut wig (2018)

The hime cut is high maintenance for those without naturally straight hair, and requires frequent touch-ups on the sidelocks and front bangs in order to maintain its shape. Hair straightening is sometimes used to achieve the hairstyle's straight appearance, as well as straightening irons and specially formulated shampoos for straight hair. Humidity is also cited as a problem with certain hair types, as the curling caused by excess humidity can change the shape of the hair. Occasionally, hair extensions are used for the side locks in order to prevent this.

The hairstyle is frequently seen in Lolita fashion, especially the classification of Gothic Lolita. Within the Lolita community, the hime cut is considered a more elegant alternative to other styles that may require frequent curling and crimping that can permanently damage the hair.

== See also ==
- Hairstyles of Japanese women
- Hikimayu (hime eyebrows)
- List of hairstyles
- Pageboy
- Pixie cut
