= Megumi Asaoka =

Japanese pop singer, and actress (born 1955)

Megumi Asaoka 麻丘めぐみ
- Born: Kayoko Fujii (藤井 佳代子); October 11, 1955 (age 71)
- Origin: Beppu, Ōita Prefecture, Japan
- Genre: Kayōkyoku
- Occupations: Idol, singer, actress
- Years active: 1958–1977, 1983–present
- Label: Victor Entertainment
- Website: megu-asa.com

Megumi Asaoka (麻丘めぐみ, Asaoka Megumi) (born October 11, 1955) is a Japanese pop singer, and actress. Her real name is Kayoko Fujii.

== Biography ==
Megumi Asaoka debuted into showbusiness at age three, with performances varying from stage productions to television commercials.

While she was attending Junior High School, Asaoka modeled for the weekly Japanese magazine Seventeen. While working as a model, she was offered a recording contract. After refusing initially, citing she did not enjoy singing and living a public life, she later accepted in hopes of being able to financially support her family.

Asaoka made her musical debut in June 1972, with the single "Mebae". The single sold over 400,000 copies and reached the No. 3 position on the Oricon charts. That same year, Asaoka won the Best Newcomer prize at the 14th edition of the Japan Record Awards.

In the summer of 1973, the song "Watashi no Kare wa Hidarikiki" (My Boyfriend Is a Lefty) hit the No. 1 spot on the Oricon charts, selling over 500,000 copies. It was the eleventh best-selling song of 1973 in Japan. It has since become her signature tune. She made an appearance on the 24th edition of Kohaku Uta Gassen with this song, and won the popularity award for it at the 15th edition of the Japan Record Awards. The song's popularity was so immense, that manufacturers and businesses capitalised on its success by producing products especially for left-handed people.

Together with fellow Japanese female entertainers Saori Minami and Mari Amachi, Asaoka laid the foundations of the modern Japanese idol. Besides her musical output, Megumi Asaoka is also known in Japan for popularising the hime cut (princess cut), which became her trademark.

She married Mitsuo Watanabe in September 1977, and retired from showbusiness. In 1983, she divorced Watanabe and subsequently made a comeback. She has one daughter, Hitomi.

After her comeback, she mainly worked as an actress. In 2009, Asaoka celebrated her 50th year in showbusiness at Sogetsu Hall, performing 28 songs. To this day, Megumi Asaoka occasionally performs songs from her old repertoire.

In 2011, the Japanese music program Music Station listed her in their Top 50 Idols of All-time based on their sale figures. She was placed no. 47, with sales exceeding 3,000,000.

== Discography ==
=== Singles ===
#	Title	Release date/chart position
1	Mebae (芽ばえ, Sprout); Debut single	1972-06-05 (#3)
2	Kanashimi Yo Konnichiwa (悲しみよこんにちは, Hello Sorrow)	1972-10-05 (#6)
3	Onnanoko Nandamon (女の子なんだもん, Just a Girl)	1973-01-15 (#7)
4	Mori Wo Kakeru Koibito Tachi (森を駈ける恋人たち, Lovers Running Through the Forest)	1973-04-30 (#7)
5	Watashi no Kare wa Hidarikiki (わたしの彼は左きき, My Boyfriend is a Lefty); Biggest hit	1973-07-05 (#1)
6	Alps no Shoujo (アルプスの少女, Girl of the Alps)	1973-10-15 (#8)
7	Tokimeki (ときめき, A Crush)	1974-01-15 (#6)
8	Shiroi Heya (白い部屋, The White Room)	1974-04-05 (#13)
9	Kanashimi no Season (悲しみのシーズン, The Season of Sadness)	1974-09-10 (#10)
10	Yuki no Naka no Futari (雪の中の二人, Two People in the Snow)	1974-12-15 (#16)
11	Mizuiro no Page (水色のページ, Light Blue Page)	1975-03-05 (#14)
12	Koi no Ayatori (恋のあやとり, String Figures of Love)	1975-06-05 (#24)
13	Utsukushiku Moe Nagara (美しく燃えながら, While It Burns Beautifully)	1975-08-15 (#37)
14	Shiroi Bishou (白い微笑, White Smile)	1975-10-25 (#44)
15	Sotsugyou (卒業, Graduation)	1976-02-05 (#63)
16	Natsu Hakkei (夏八景, Eighth Summer)	1976-06-05 (#64)
17	Yogiro no Dekigoto (夜霧の出来事, Misty Night Affair)	1976-09-05 (#83)
18	Ginsekai (銀世界, Snow Covered World)	1977-01-25 (#77)
19	Neh (ねえ, Hey)	1977-10-05 (#-)
20	Aitaiyo (あいたいよ, I Miss You)	1984-05-25 (#-)
21	Kyouto Aishuu (京都哀愁, Kyoto Melancholy)	1985-05-25 (#-)
22	Rikon Bijin (離婚美人, Divorced Beauty)	1986-08-21 (#-)
23	Yasashiku Shinaide (やさしくしないで, Don't Be Careful)	1991-09-26 (#-)

=== Studio albums ===
#	Title	Release date/chart position
1	Sawayaka (さわやか); Debut album	1972-08-05 (#9)
2	Akogare (あこがれ)	1972-12-20 (#6)
3	Megumino Kyuujitsu (めぐみの休日)	1973-05-25 (#12)
4	Megumito Wakai Nakama Tachi (めぐみと若い仲間たち)	1973-08-25 (#13)
5	Shiroi Heya (白い部屋)	1974-04-25 (#22)
6	Roman He No Tabidachi (ロマンへの旅立ち)	1975-04-25 (#39)
7	Seishun (青春)	1975-07-05 (#28)
8	Haru Shitaku (春支度)	1976-07-01 (#-)
9	Fashion Privacy (プライバシー・ファッション)	1976-07-01 (#92)
10	Shirakabe No Shouzou (白壁の肖像)	1976-11-15 (#-)

=== Live albums ===
#	Title	Release date
1	Yume Hiraku RECITAL (夢ひらくリサイタル); First live album	1974-04-25
2	20 Toshi Asaoka Megumi RECITAL (20歳 麻丘めぐみリサイタル)	1975-12-20
3	IDOL Densetsu Tatta 1 Do No RECITAL (アイドル伝説 たった1度のリサイタル)	1983-05-01

Preceded by Rumiko Koyanagi	Japan Record Award for Best New Artist; 1972	Succeeded by Junko Sakurada
