= Pixie cut =

Short hairstyle

A pixie cut is a short hairstyle, generally short on the back and sides of the head and slightly longer on the top, with very short bangs. It is a variant of a crop.

== History ==
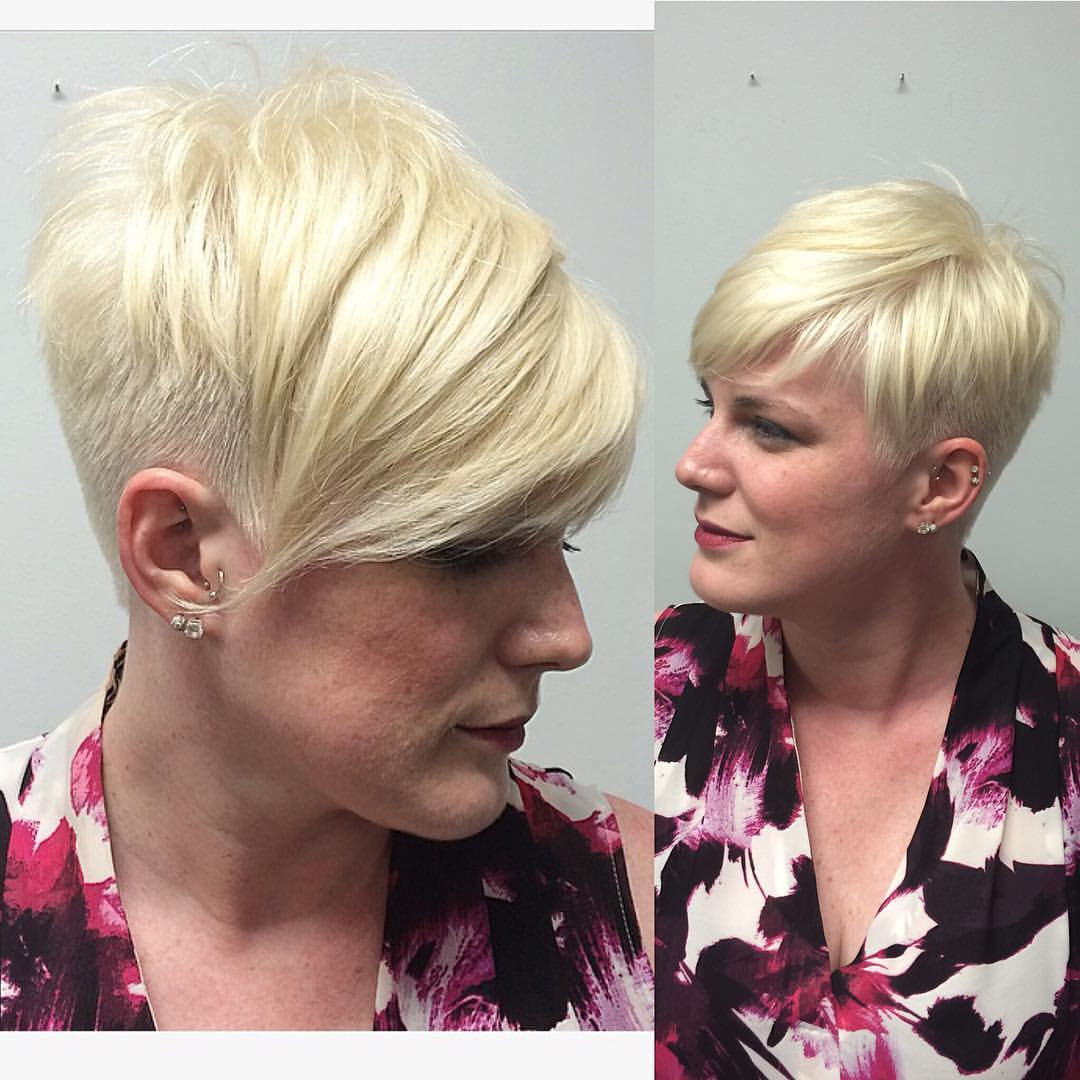
Blonde woman with a pixie cut

The pixie cut was first popularized in the 1950s, when Audrey Hepburn wore the style in Roman Holiday (1953). "Hepburn went a long way to making short hair mainstream and got a lot of credit for popularizing the pixie cut," explains hair historian Rachael Gibson. Jean Seberg sported a pixie cut for Otto Preminger's Bonjour Tristesse (1958) and Jean-Luc Godard's Breathless (1960). Further in the 1960s, the look was worn by actress Mia Farrow (notably in Rosemary's Baby from 1968), British model Twiggy, American model, actress and socialite Edie Sedgwick, and Laugh-In (1968–73) star Goldie Hawn.

Pixie cuts became fashionable again in early 1990s, with its most notable wearer being Demi Moore in that year's top-grossing film: Ghost. Us Weekly declared Moore as "the only woman since Audrey Hepburn who has been able to carry off such a hairdo and still look like a woman". Julia Roberts sported the hairstyle as Tinker Bell in the 1991 film Hook. The pixie cut was also big in the mid-1990s, as worn by waif model Lucie de la Falaise, actress Winona Ryder, and singer Madonna during her world tour "The Girlie Show" (1993). In the 2000s, Halle Berry appeared in the James Bond film Die Another Day (2002) wearing a pixie cut. Pixies are also very easy to maintain and can be worn casually or dressed up for special occasions.

In December 2023, Eve Gilles, while sporting a pixie cut, became the first woman with short hair to be crowned Miss France, which led to media attention both in France and internationally regarding the cyberbullying she had received due to her hairstyle. "While long hair has traditionally been associated with femininity, short hair challenges conventional beauty standards, allowing women to redefine their notions of beauty, femininity, and strength," explains celebrity hairstylist Jordan Jay Brumant.

== In popular culture ==
Columnist Pamela Hutchinson of The Guardian noted that the pixie cut hairstyle is often portrayed in films in a negative way, usually when actors play characters that have been traumatized, imprisoned or are undergoing cancer treatment, and "embrace the extensions as soon as the fuss dies down".

== Gallery ==
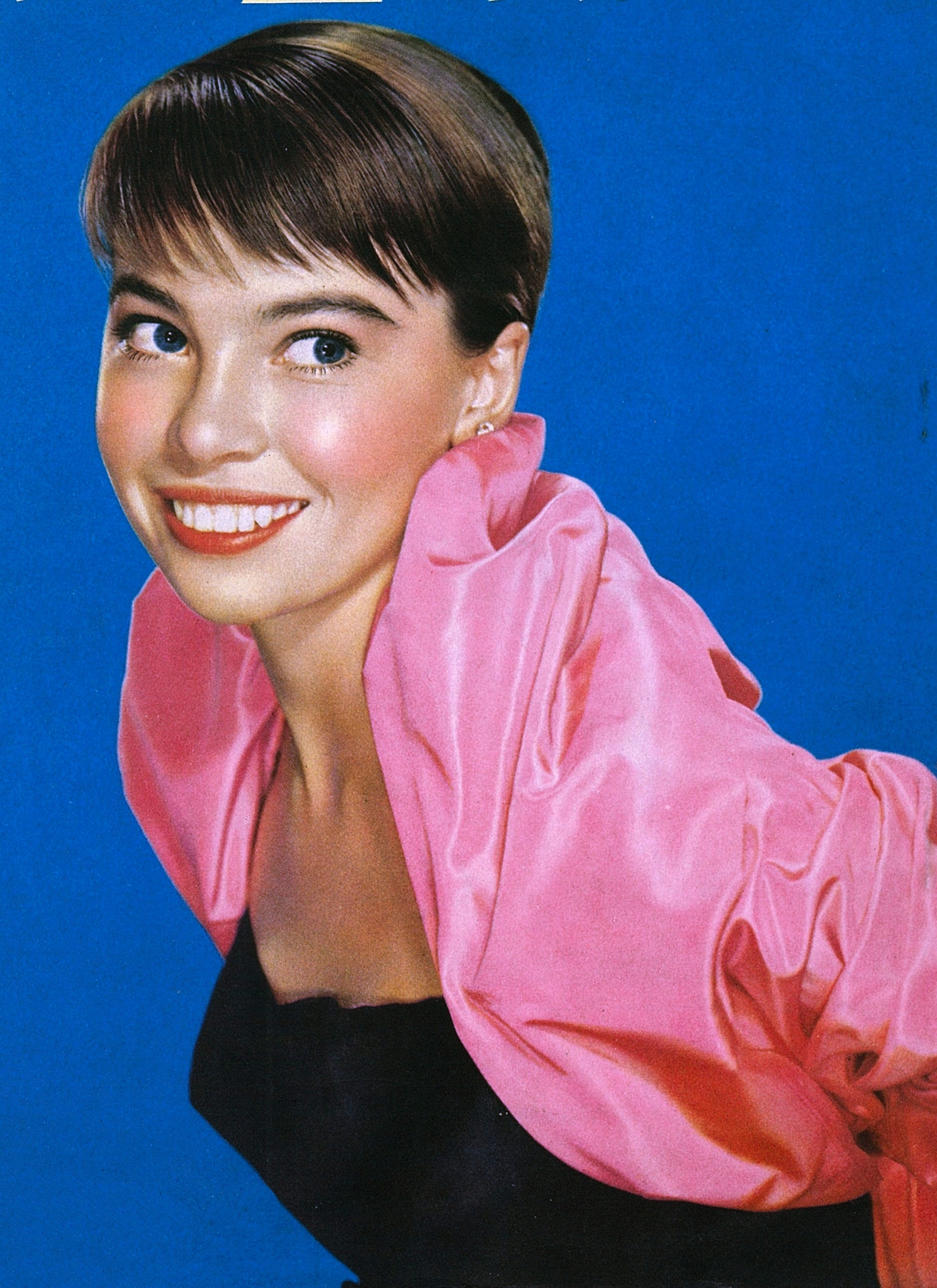
Leslie Caron (1953)

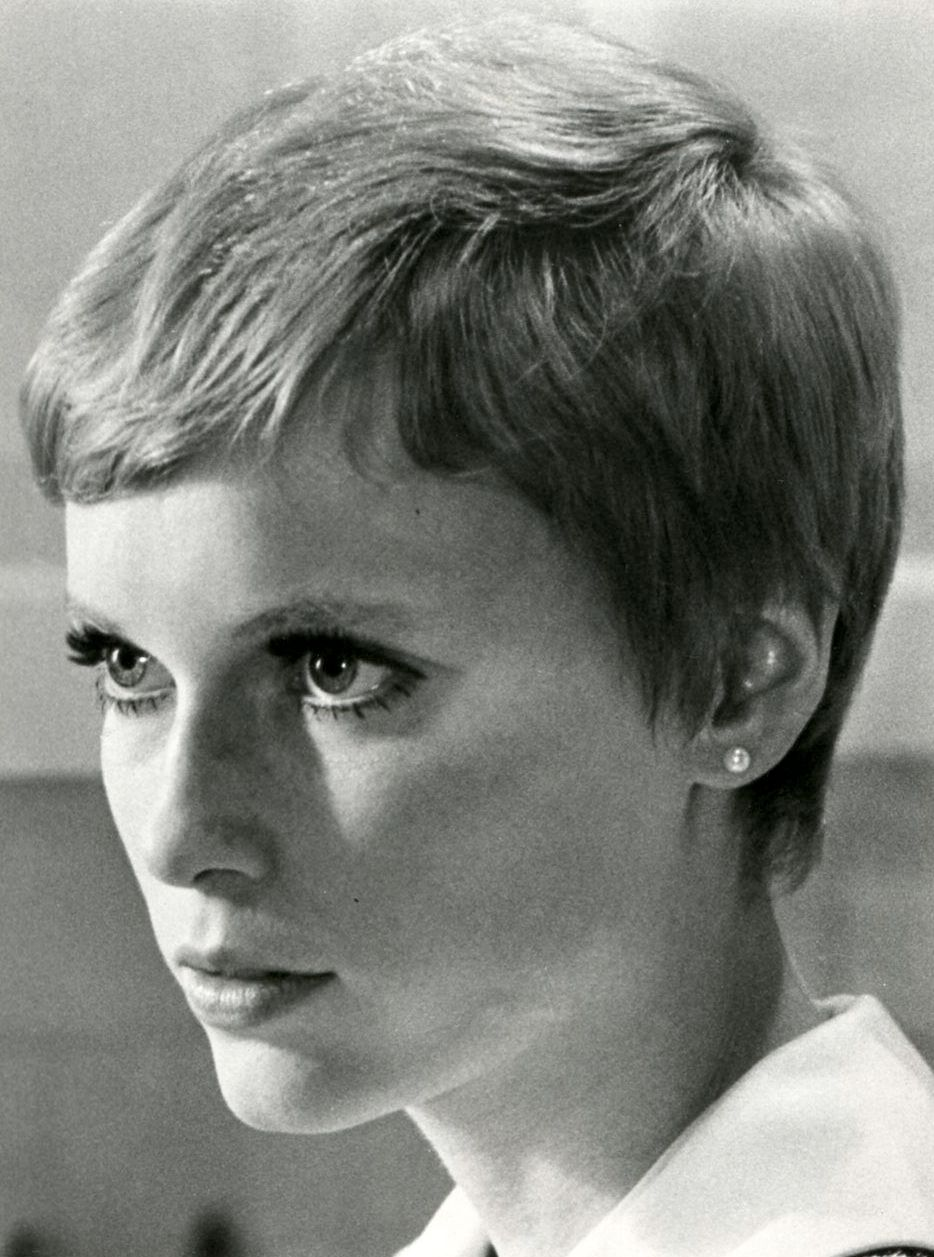
Mia Farrow (1968)

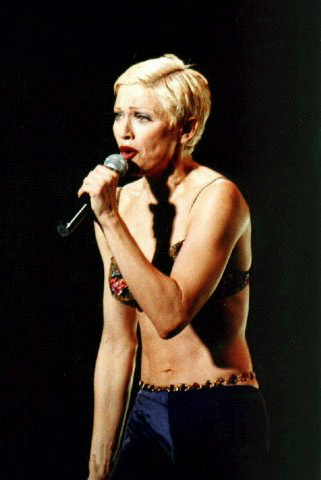
Madonna (1993)

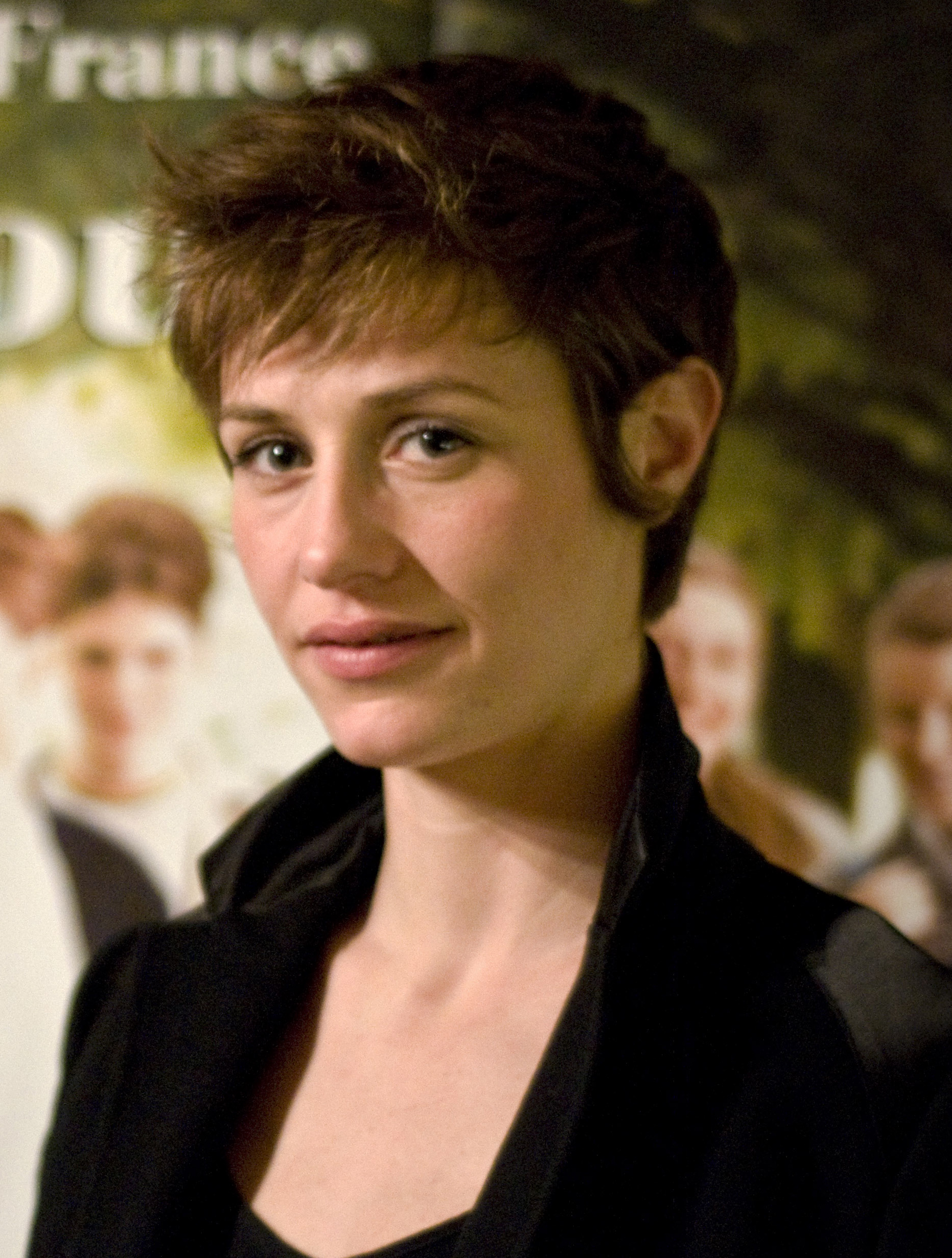
Cécile de France (2009)

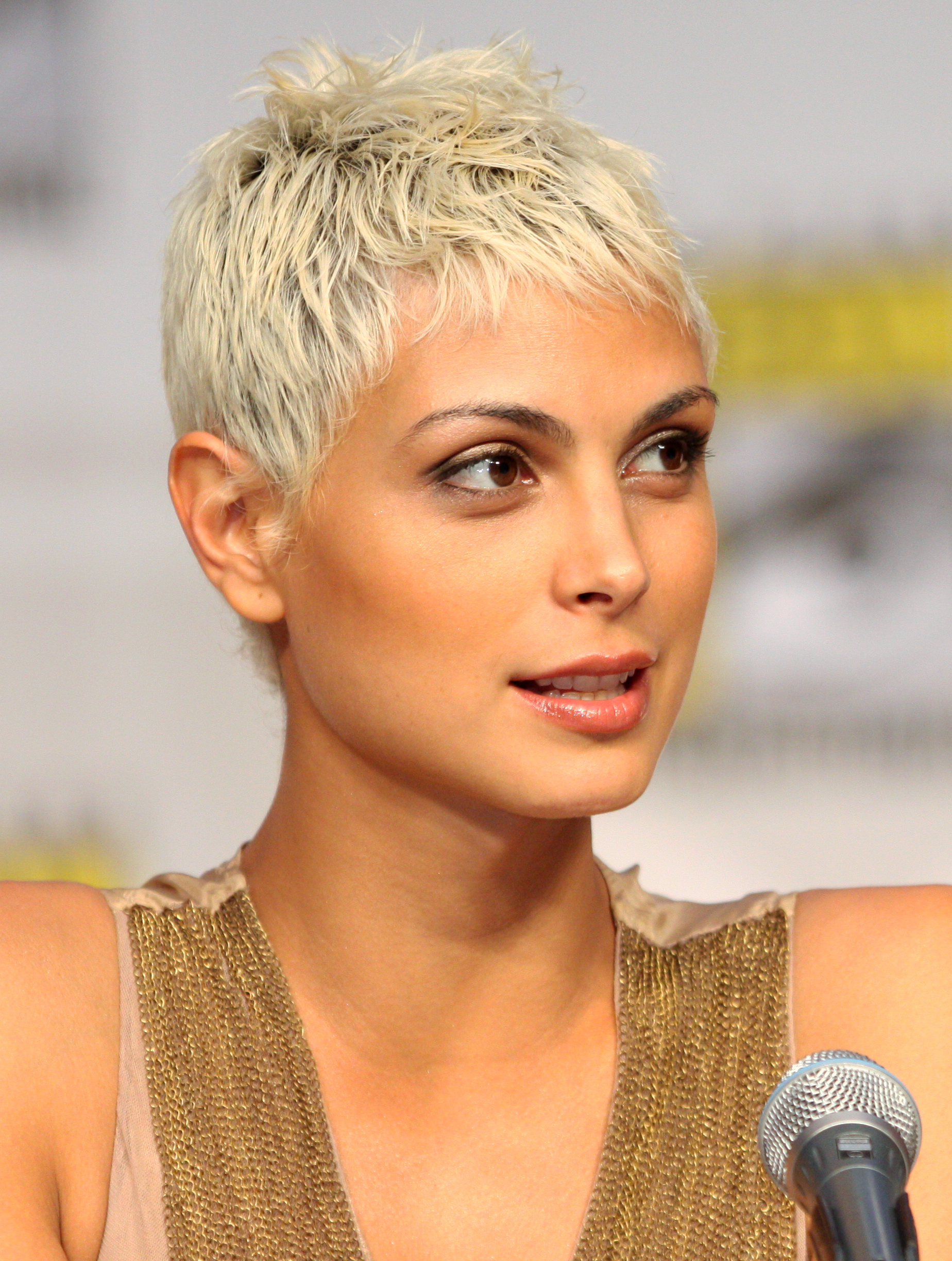
Morena Baccarin (2010)

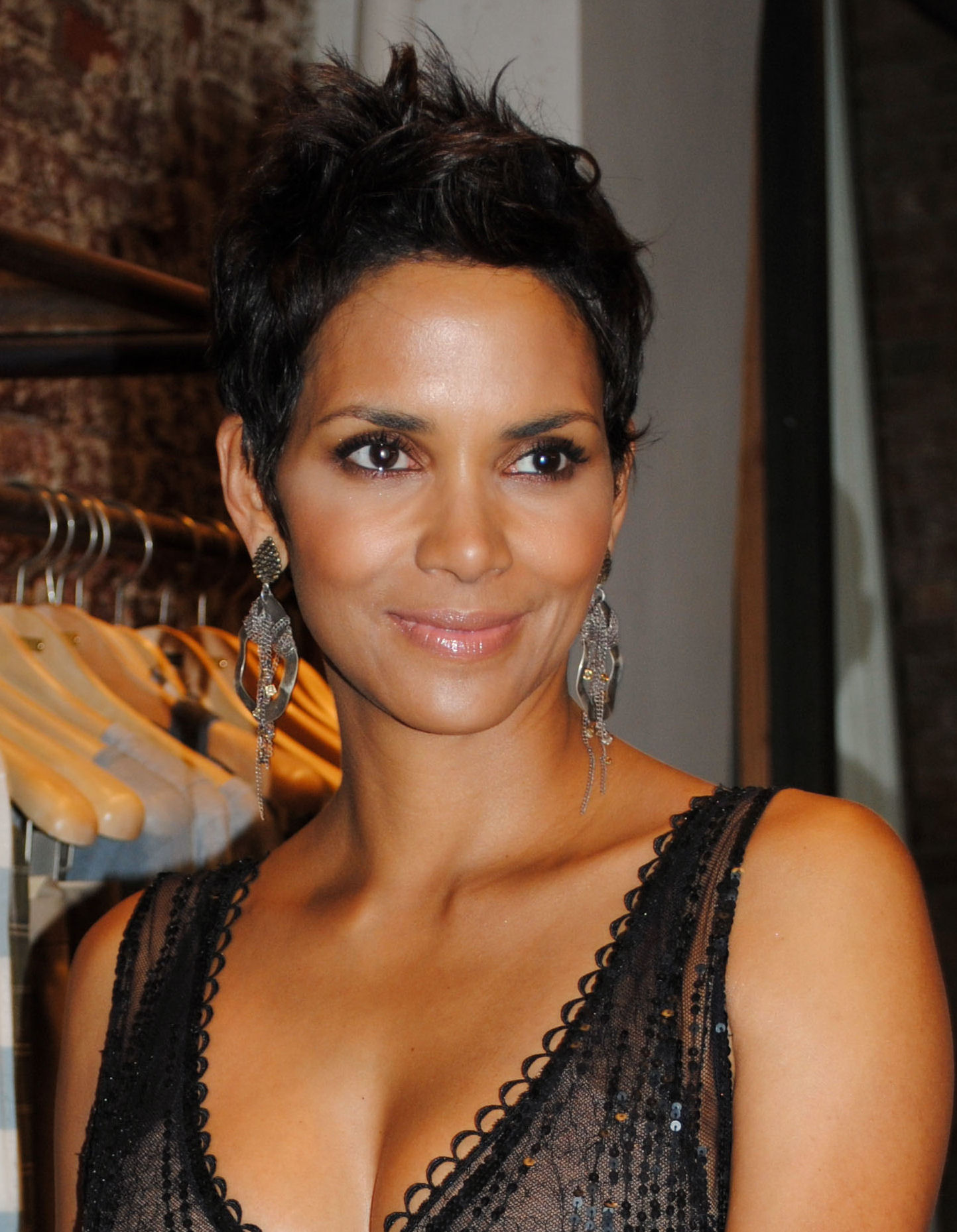
Halle Berry (2010)

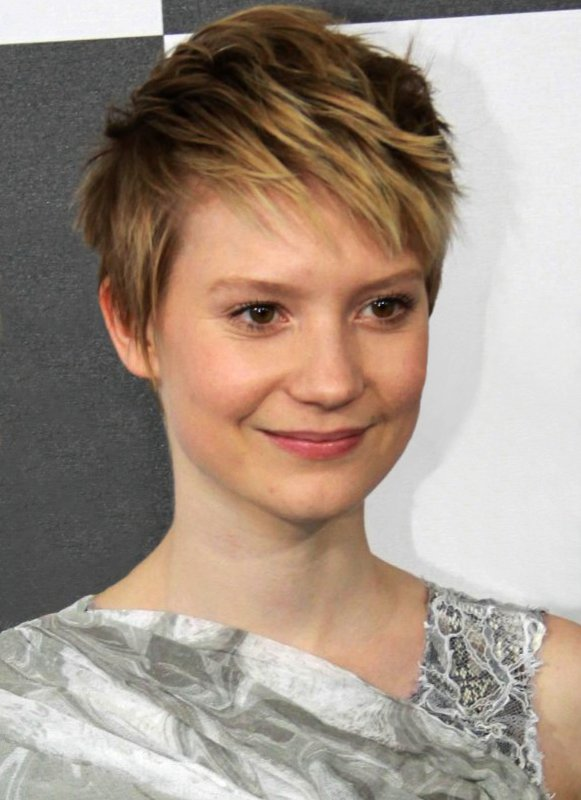
Mia Wasikowska (2010)

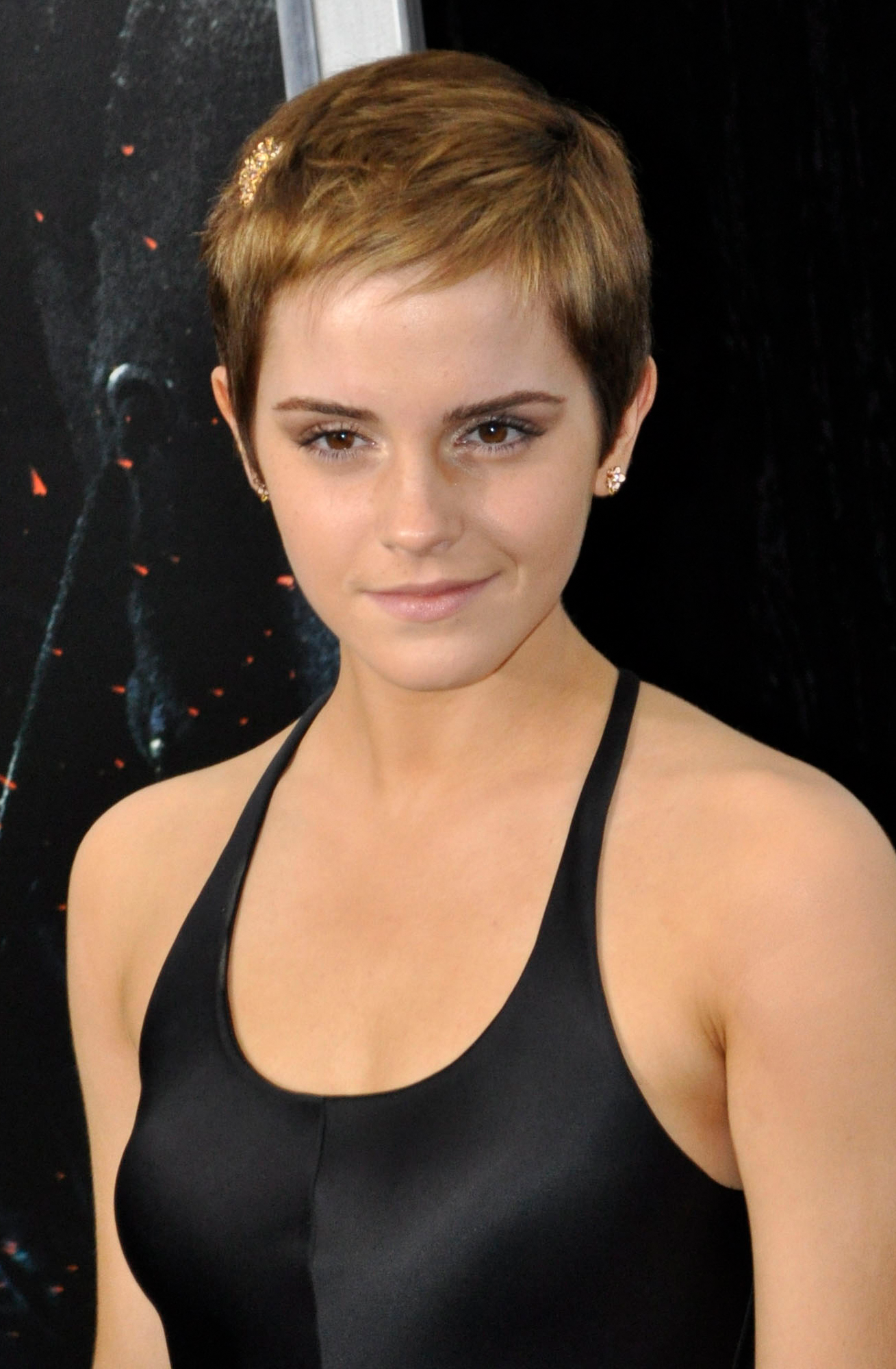
Emma Watson (2010)

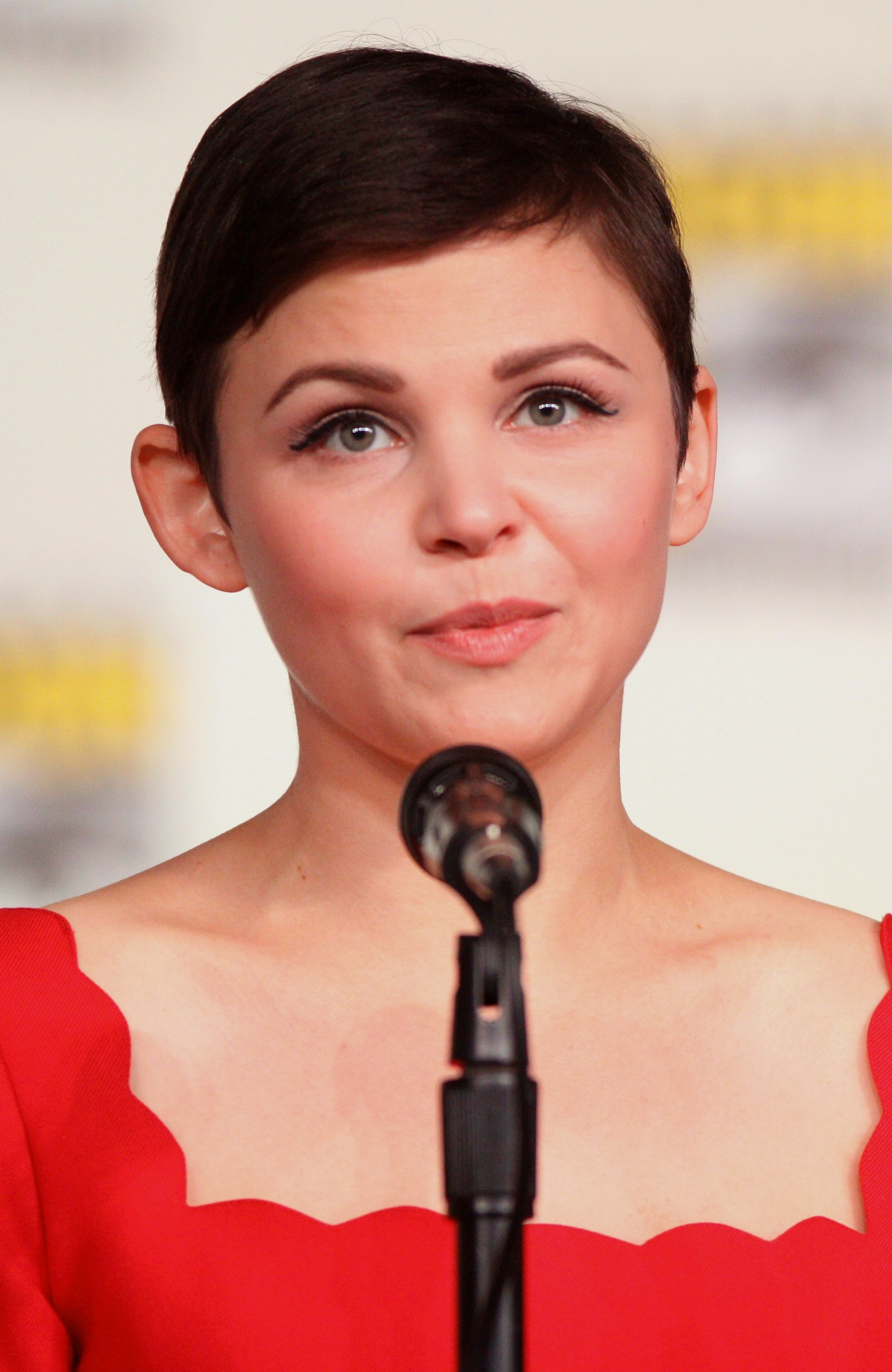
Ginnifer Goodwin (2012)

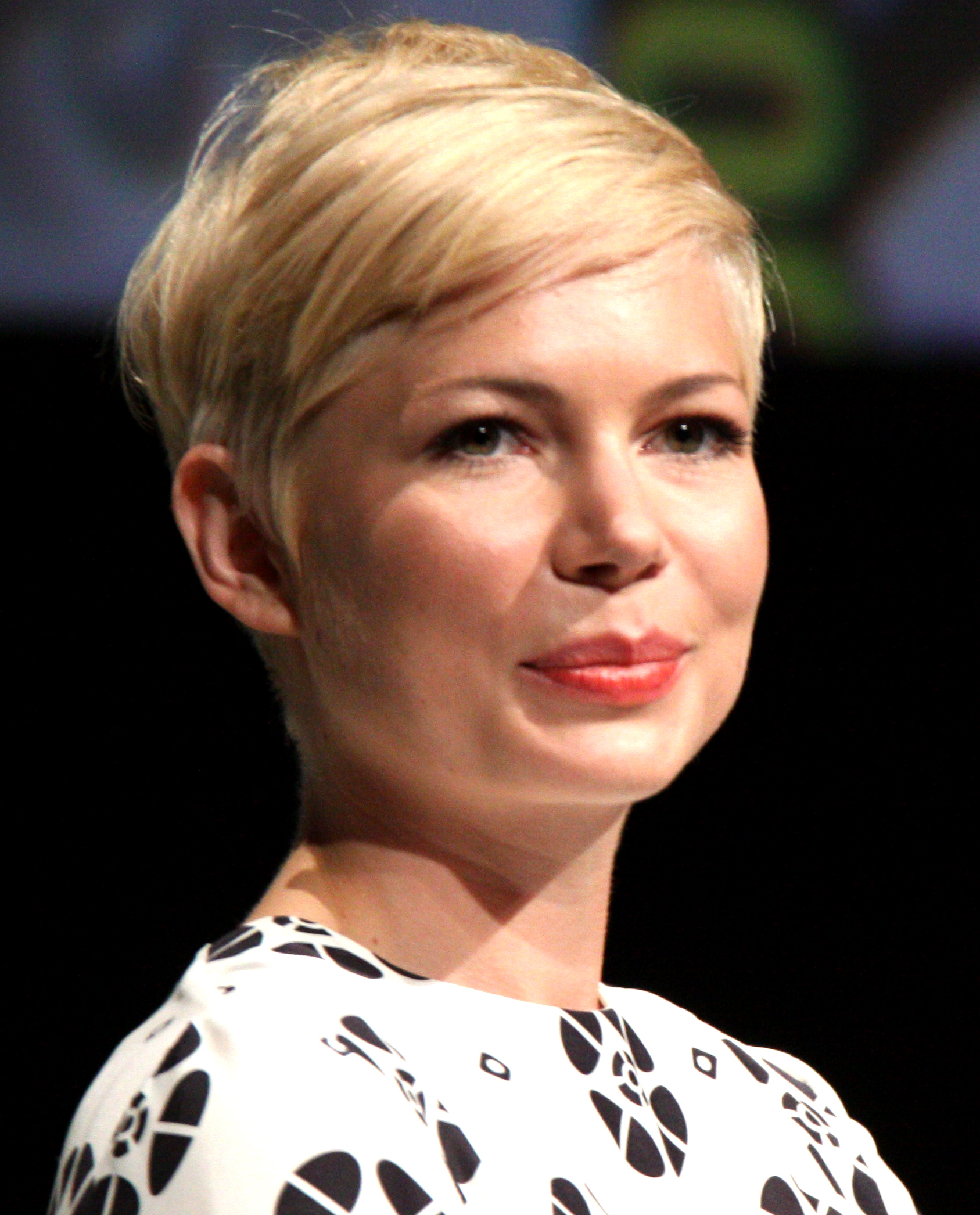
Michelle Williams (2012)

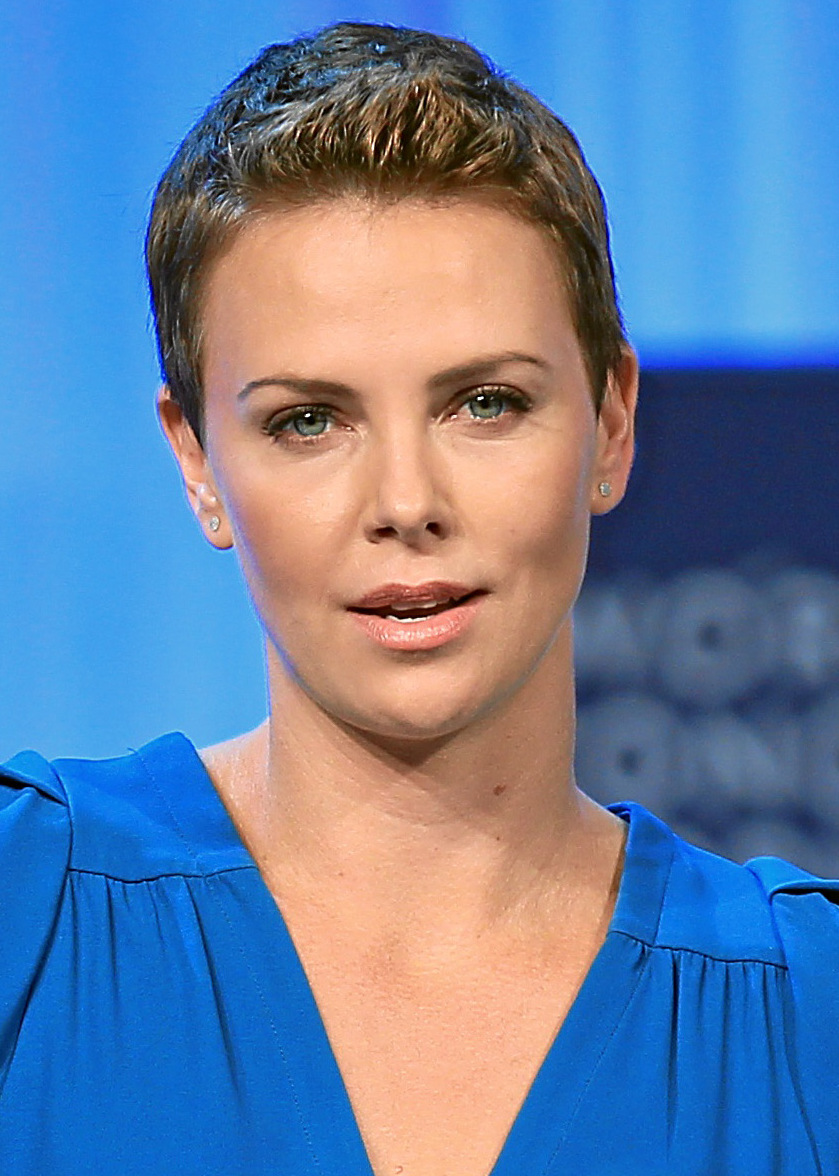
Charlize Theron (2013)

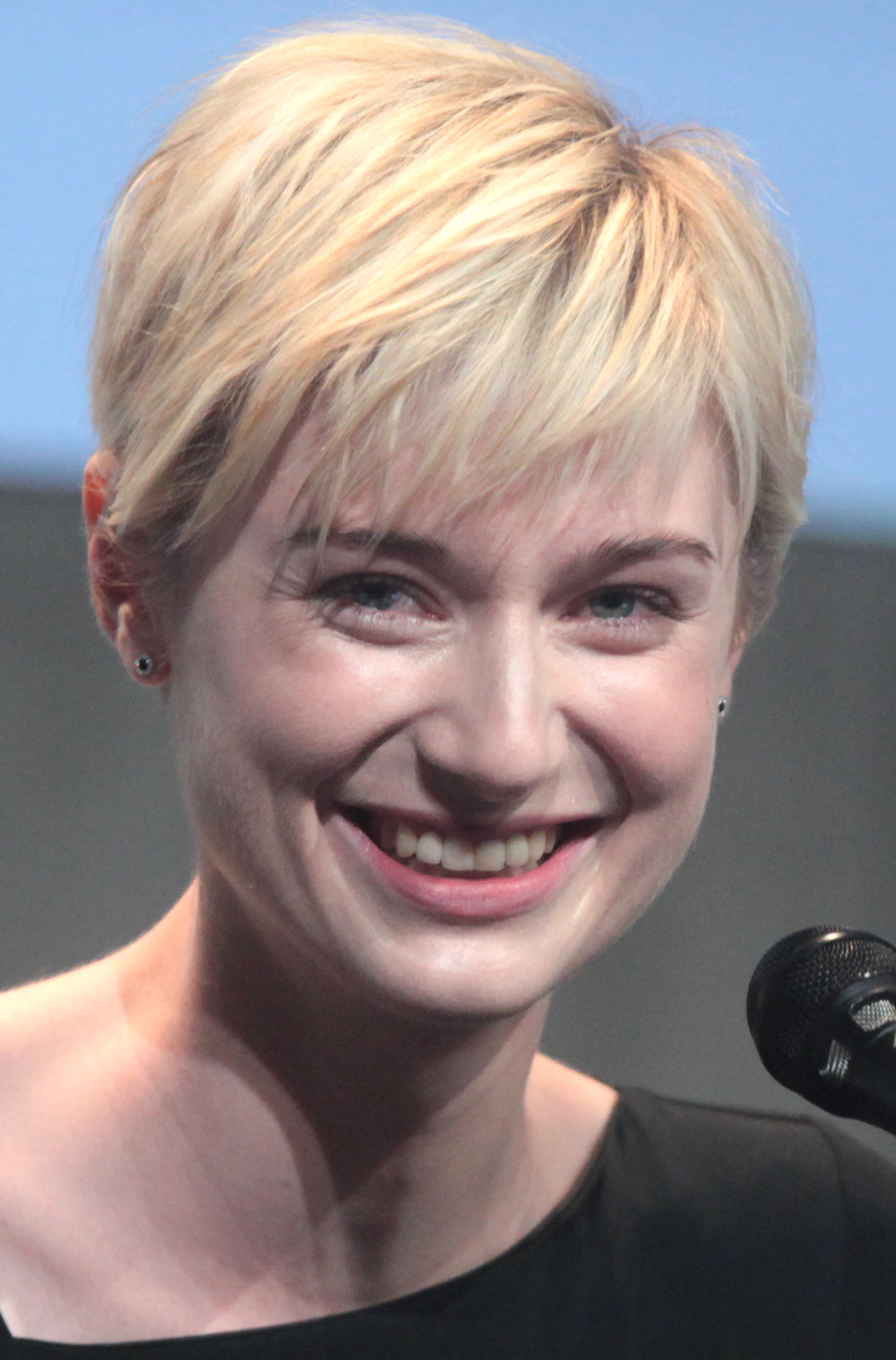
Elizabeth Debicki (2015)

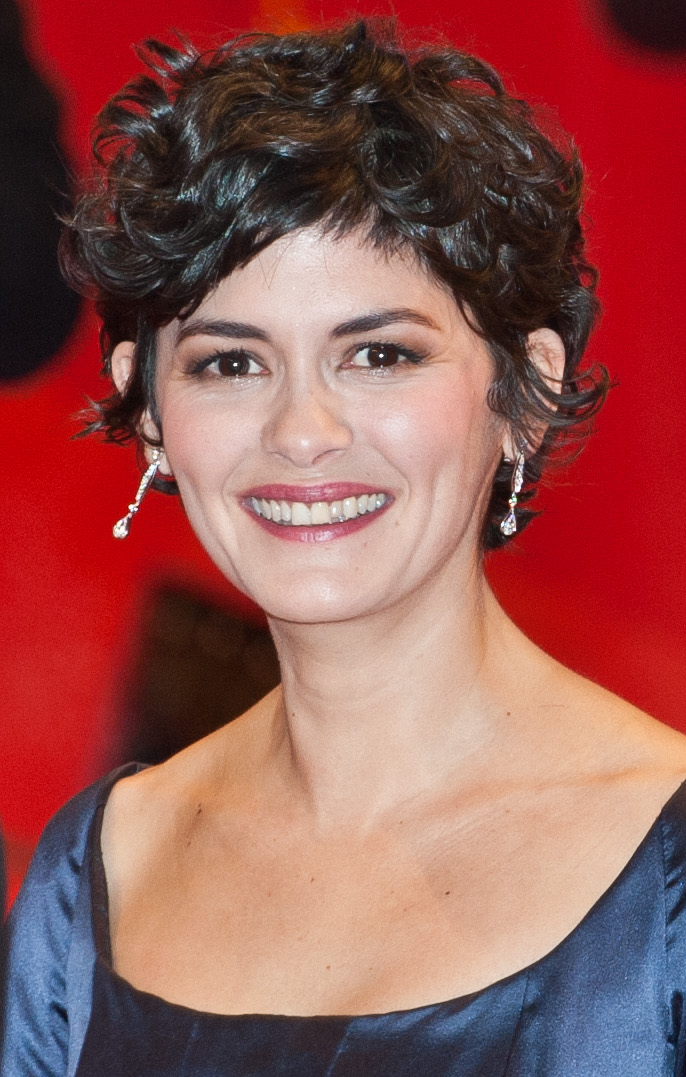
Audrey Tautou (2015)

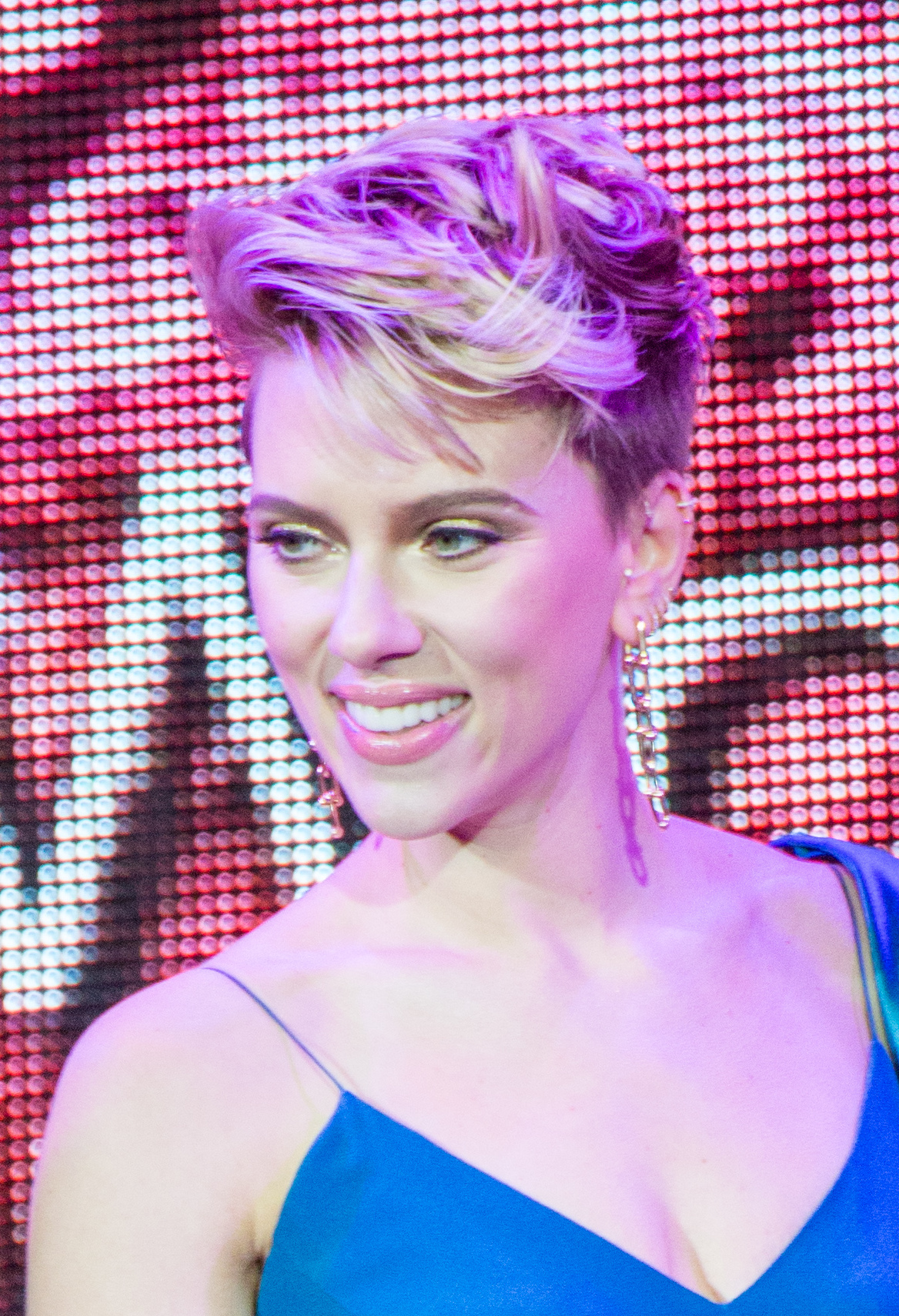
Scarlett Johansson (2017)

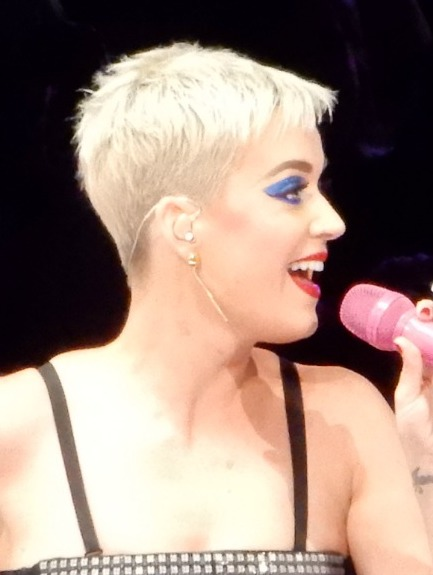
Katy Perry (2017)

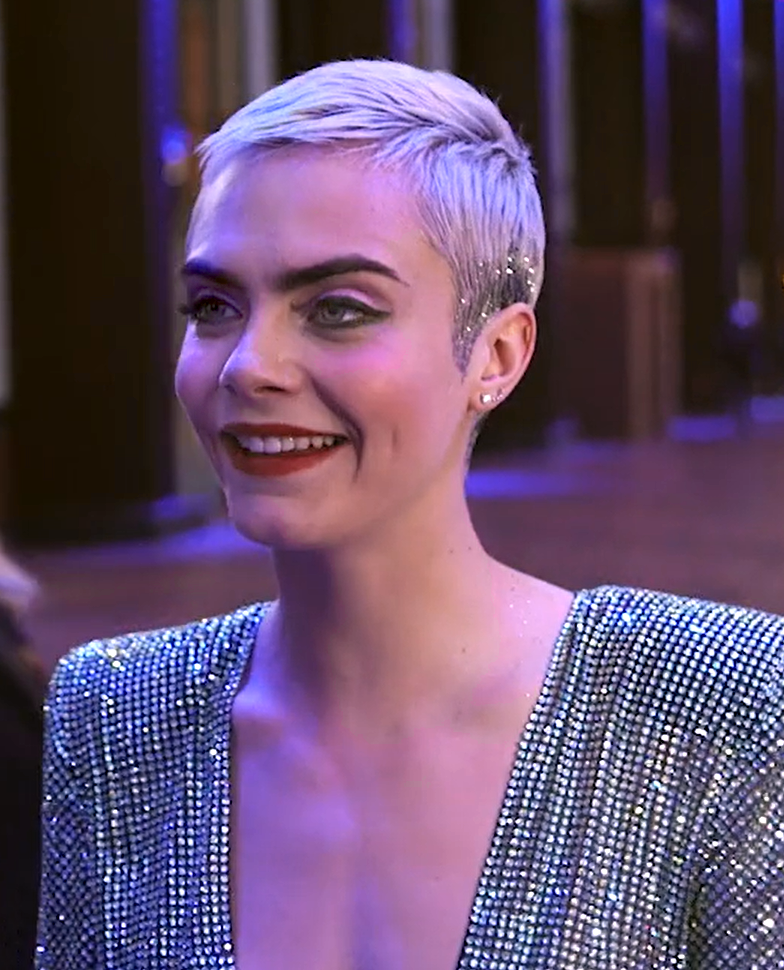
Cara Delevingne (2018)

== See also ==
- Hime cut
- List of hairstyles
- Pageboy
