= Trokiando =

Mexican-American truck subculture

Trokiando (Spanglish for 'trucking') is a Mexican-American subculture of car enthusiasts based around the customization of pickup trucks (trokas). Members call themselves takuaches (masc., from Spanish tlacuache 'opossum') or takuachitas (fem.). Trokiano is in part a continuation of the Mexican-American car customization tradition from lowrider culture, coupled with an idiosyncratic aesthetic combining Hispanic cowboy culture affects with Mexican-American culture, particularly the Edgar haircut.

== History ==
Trokiando first developed in the northeastern Mexican states of Chihuahua, Nuevo León and Tamaulipas before spreading into the Lower Rio Grande Valley of Texas. The subculture then spread across the southwestern United States, largely due to social media popularizing the takuache aesthetic. The Edgar cut in particular became a viral phenomenon among young Hispanic gen Z men in the mid-2020s, making the subculture more visible through its association with the haircut.

== Culture ==
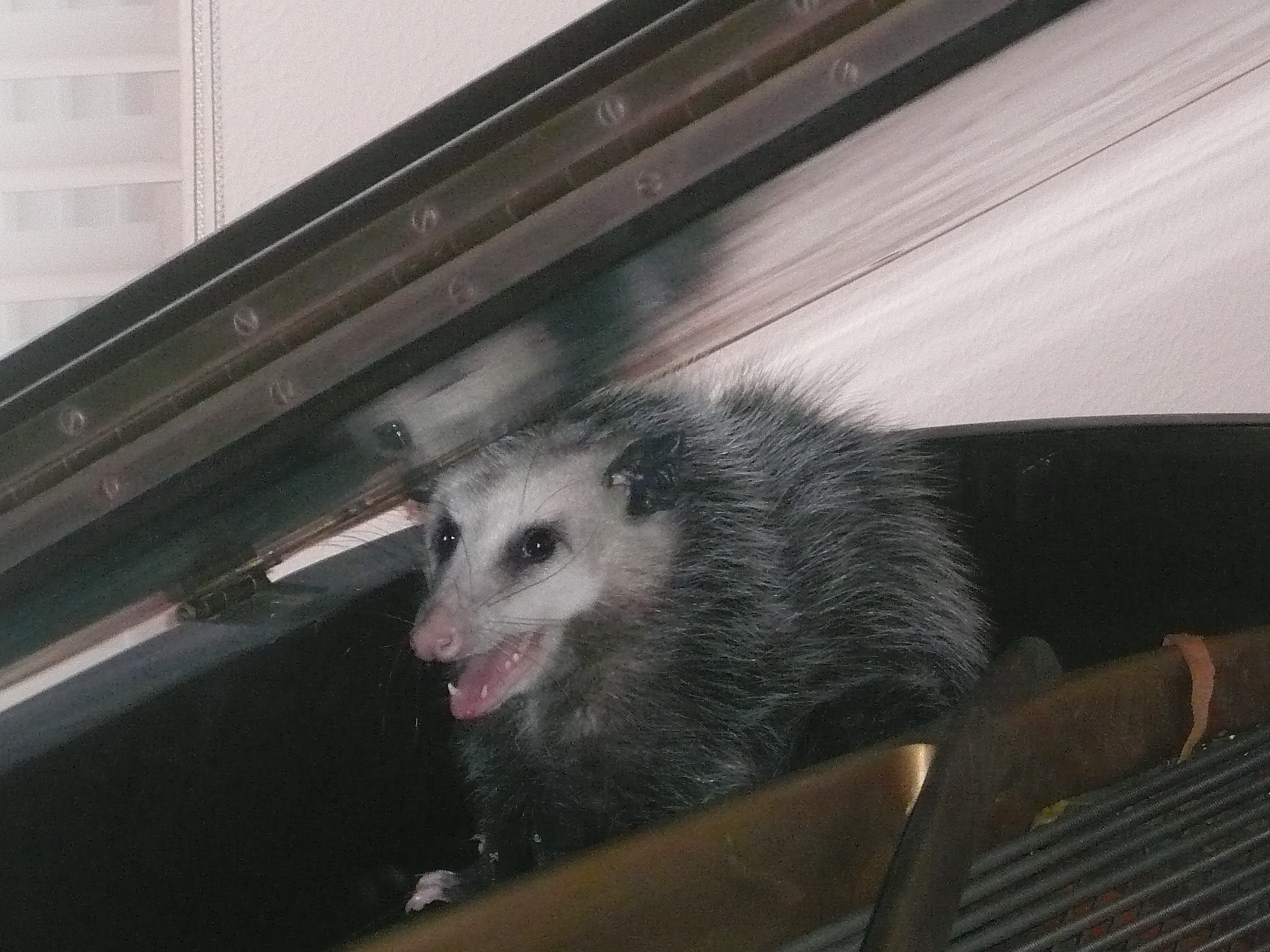
Virginia possum in Houston, Texas, the only native opossum to Northern America. Takuache derives from the Mexican Spanish tlacuache, for opossum.

Takuaches readily use Spanglish as a form of self-expression and for shibboleths, particularly via the phrase "No quema llan[t]a la troca, cuh" (transl. "That truck can't burn rubber, [cuh]"), sometimes shortened to "No quema, cuh." The term 'cuh', a clipping of 'cousin', is used as a multifarious noun of address by takuaches.

A typical takuache outfit is modern Hispanic cowboy culture dress featuring square-toe cowboy boots or basketball shoes, boot-cut jeans, gold chains, and a cowboy hat or fitted cap. Takuachitas additionally wear makeup, particularly highlighter and false eyelashes. Body modification with piercings and tattoos are common.

Takuache social culture is largely based around truck meets and Mexican music. To the former, trokiando truck meets typically feature a 'donut pit' for custom trucks to do doughnuts and burnouts. Regional Mexican music like corridos tumbados, cumbia, huapango, norteño, and tribal guarachero feature heavily at events and are played in trucks by takuaches; dancing is a popular activity.

== Ethos ==
Trokiando and takuache culture is a hybrid culture between Hispanic cowboy culture and Chicano culture like lowrider culture, showing a pride for Hispanic heritage among Gen Z, second generation immigrant Mexican-Americans. Trokiando truck modification and the takuache culture can be seen as an example of rasquachismo (from Mexican Spanish rascuache, transl. 'poor quality'), an observation both made positively or as a classist remark.
