= 14th Japan Record Awards =

1972 Japanese music awards ceremony

- Date: 31 December 1972
- Venue: Imperial Garden Theater, Tokyo
- Hosted by: Keizo Takahashi, Mitsuko Mori

Television/radio coverage
- Network: TBS

The 14th Annual Japan Record Awards took place at the Imperial Garden Theater in Chiyoda, Tokyo, on 31 December 1972, starting at 7:00 PM JST. The primary ceremonies were televised in Japan on TBS.

The audience rating was 46.5%.

== Award winners ==
Japan Record Award

- Naomi Chiaki for "Kassai"
  - Lyricist: Ou Yoshida
  - Composer: Taiji Nakamura
  - Arranger: Hiroshi Takada
  - Record Company: Nippon Columbia

Best Vocalist

- Akiko Wada for "Ano Kane Wo Narasunowa Anata"

Best New Artist

- Megumi Asaoka for "Mebae"

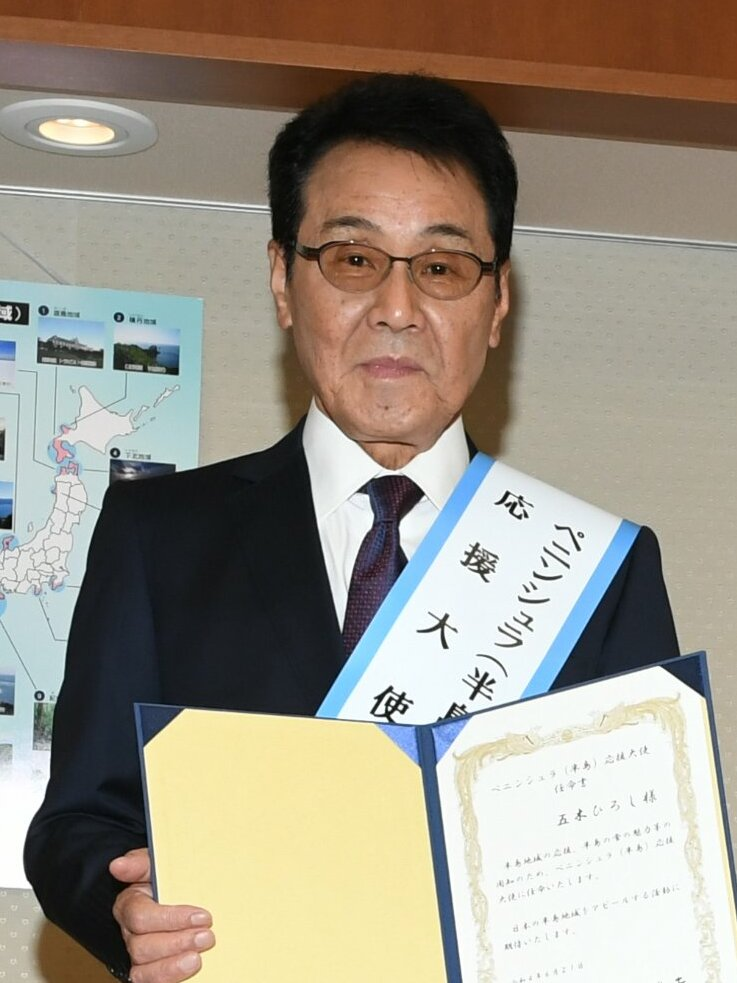
Hiroshi Itsuki, awarded again for Vocalist Award.

Vocalist Award

- Rumiko Koyanagi for "Seto No Hanayome"
  - Last year's best new artist, the vocalist that has the most potential to receive the Japan Record Award. However, given to Chiaki sings the wrong lyric during the performance.
- Hiroshi Itsuki for "Yogisha No Onna"
  - Awarded again after last year, 2nd vocalist award.
- Kenji Sawada for "Yurusarenai Ai"

New Artist Award

- Aoi Sankujyougi for "Taiyou Ga Kureta Kisetsu"
- Go Hiromi for "Otoko No Ko Onna No Ko"
- Eiji Miyoshi for "Ame"
- Masako Mori for "Sensei"

General Public Award

- Mari Amachi for "Mizuiro No Koi" & "Hitojyanai No"
- Yukio Hashi for "Kodzure Ookami"

Lyricist Award

- Kazuya Senke for "Shuuchaku Eki"
  - Singer: Chiyo Okumura

Composer Award

- Shunichi Tokura for "Dounimo Tomaranai" and "Namida"
  - Singer: Linda Yamamoto and Jun Inoue

Arranger Award

- Shiroo Tsuchimochi for "Hachi No Musashi Wa Shindanosa"
  - Singer: Takao Hirata & Sellsters

Planning Award

- Dark Ducks & King Records for "Nihon Kasho Oyakka"
  - Awarded again after 5 years, King Record's 3rd planning award.

Children's Song Award

- Suginami Junior Chorus & Zei Kanamori for "Pin Pon Pan Taisou"

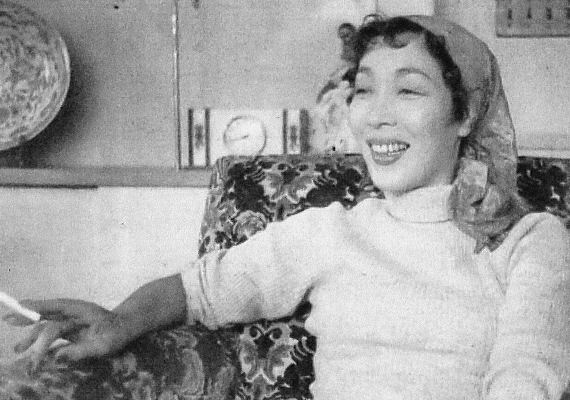
Fubuki Koshiji, Special Award awarder, another award after awarded Vocalist Award 7 years ago.

Special Award

- Fubuki Koshiji
  - Song: Dare Mo Inai Umi
- Miyuki Ishimoto
  - Songs: Onna No Kaikyou, Minatomachi Juusanbanchi, Nagasaki No Zazonburi

== See also ==
- 1972 in Japanese music
