= Bowl cut =

Haircut type

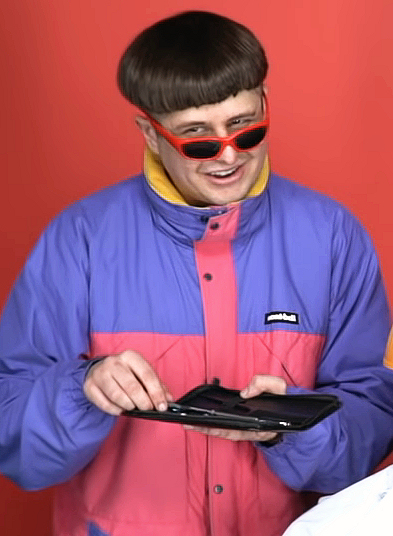
Musician Oliver Tree sporting a bowl cut in 2019

A bowl cut is a simple haircut where the front hair is cut with a straight fringe (see bangs) and the rest of the hair is left longer, the same length all the way around, or else the sides and back are cut to the same short length. It is named so because in medieval times, when it was popular in Europe, a bowl would be placed on the head and then used as a cutting guide to trim the hair with scissors.

== History ==
Historically, the bowl cut was popular among common European and Asian men, being an easy, neat cut done by a non-professional. Indeed, it was done by putting a cooking pot of a fit size to the level of ears, and all hair below the rim was cut or shaved off. In some cultures it was a normal type of haircut. In other cultures the bowl cut was viewed as an attribute of poverty, signifying that the wearer could not afford to visit a barber.

Characteristic of the late Middle Ages in Europe, the bowl cut was particularly popular among men during the first half of the 15th century.

In February 1429, Joan of Arc had her hair cut in accordance with this masculine fashion; she also wore men's clothing from that date onwards. In 1431, the records of her trial maliciously mention that her hair was "shaved round like... a fashionable young man."

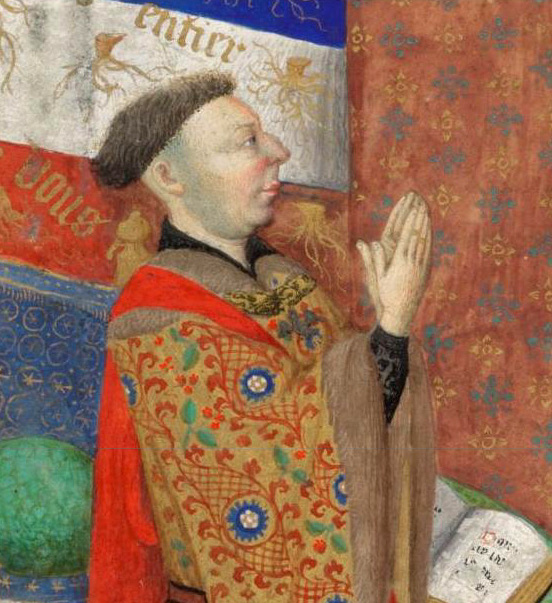
Detail from the Bedford Hours (c.1410–30)

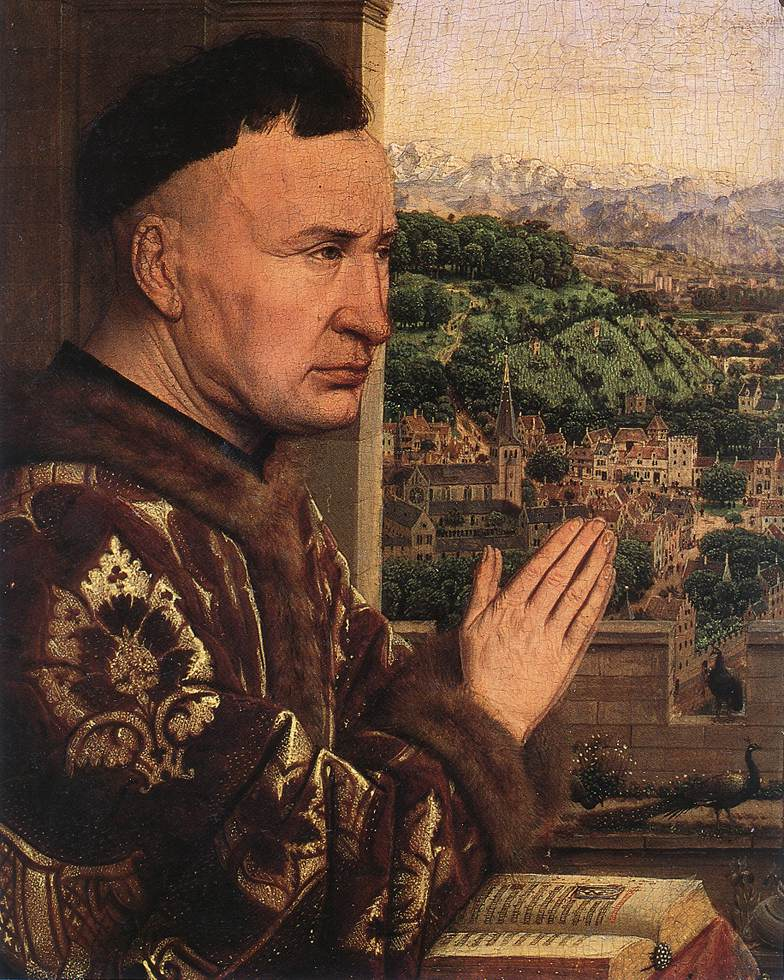
Detail from the Madonna of Chancellor Rolin (detail) (c.1435)

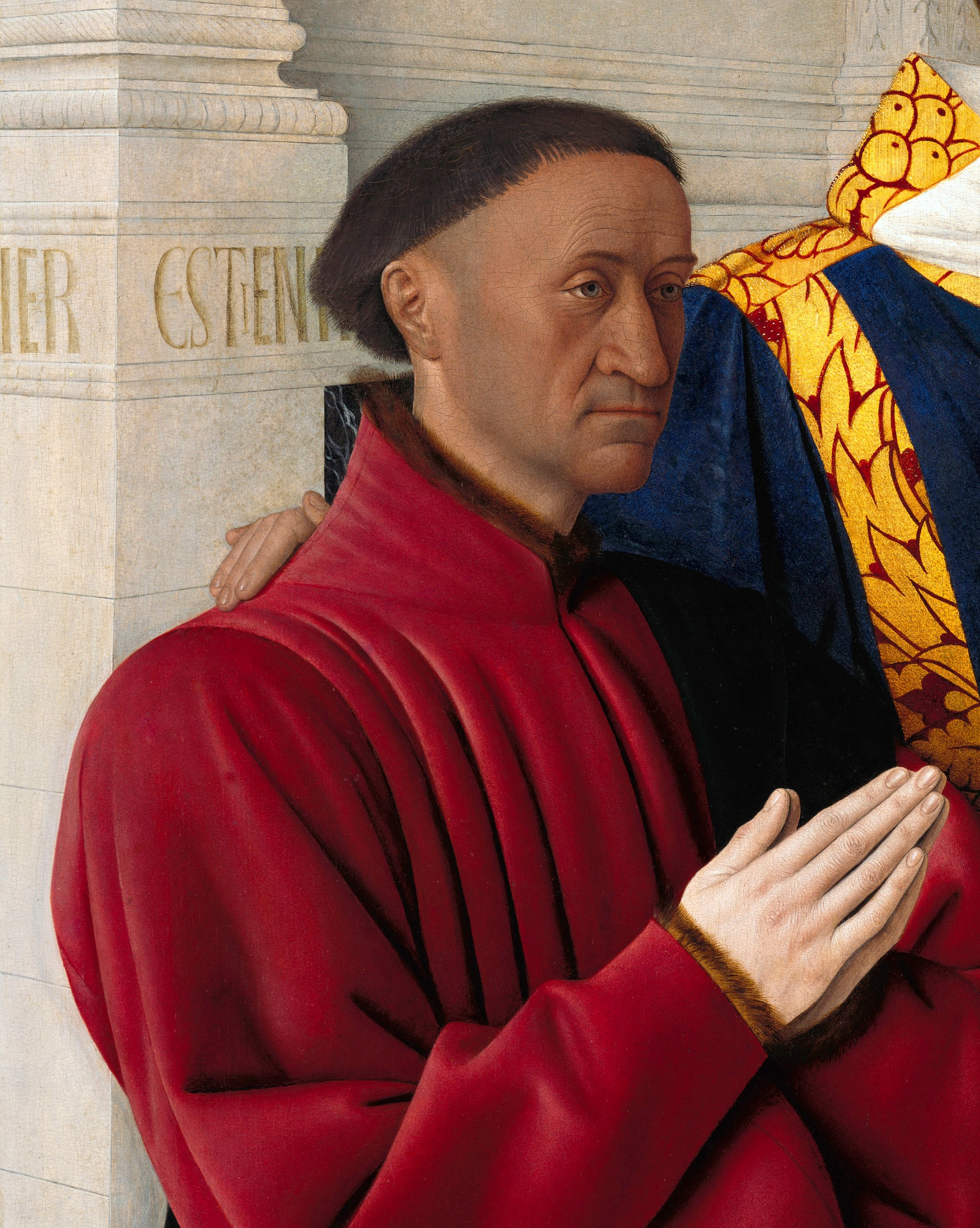
Detail from the Melun Diptych (c.1452)

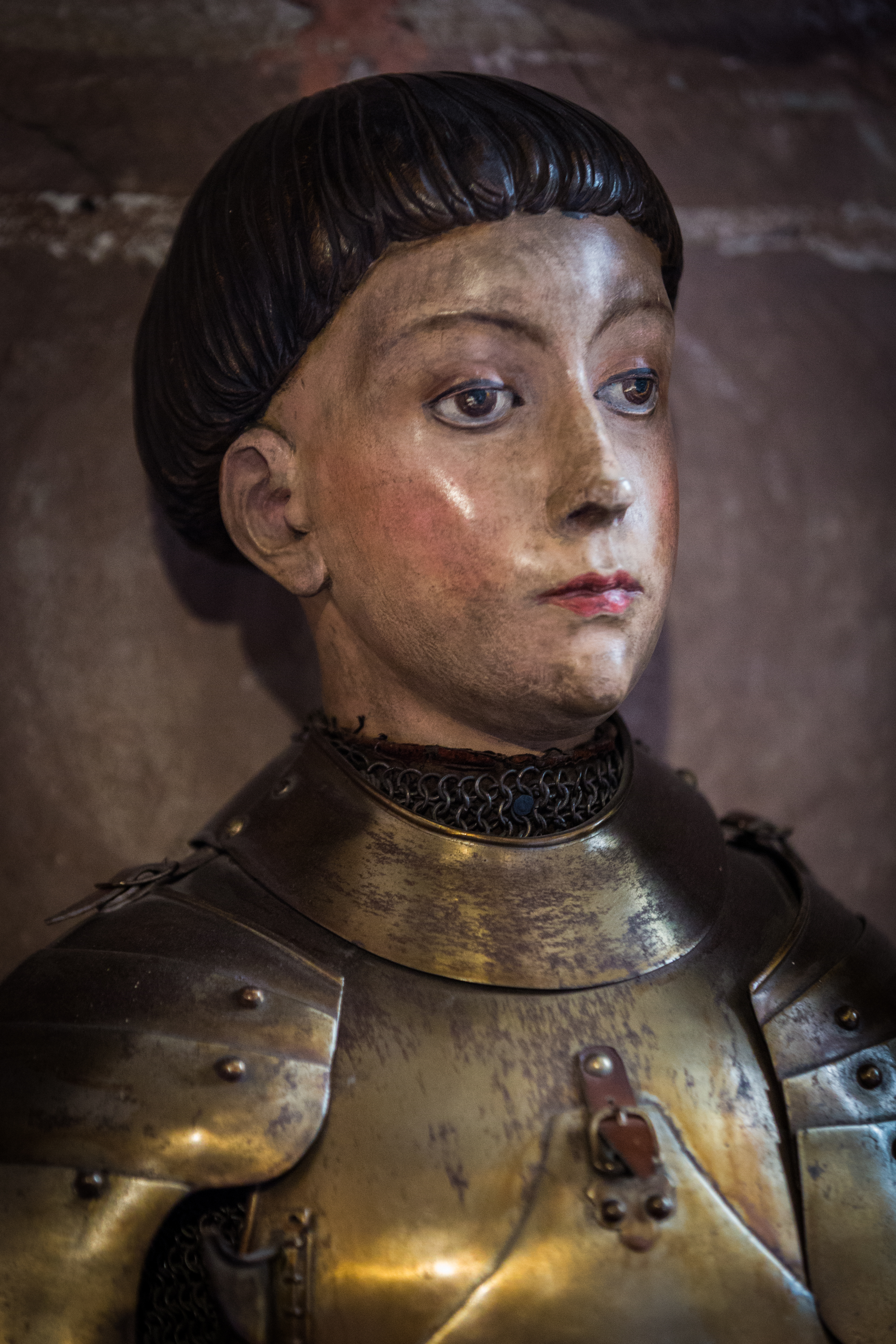
Joan of Arc sporting the characteristic bowl cut of the first half of the 15th century. Sculpture created in 1937, Strasbourg Cathedral.

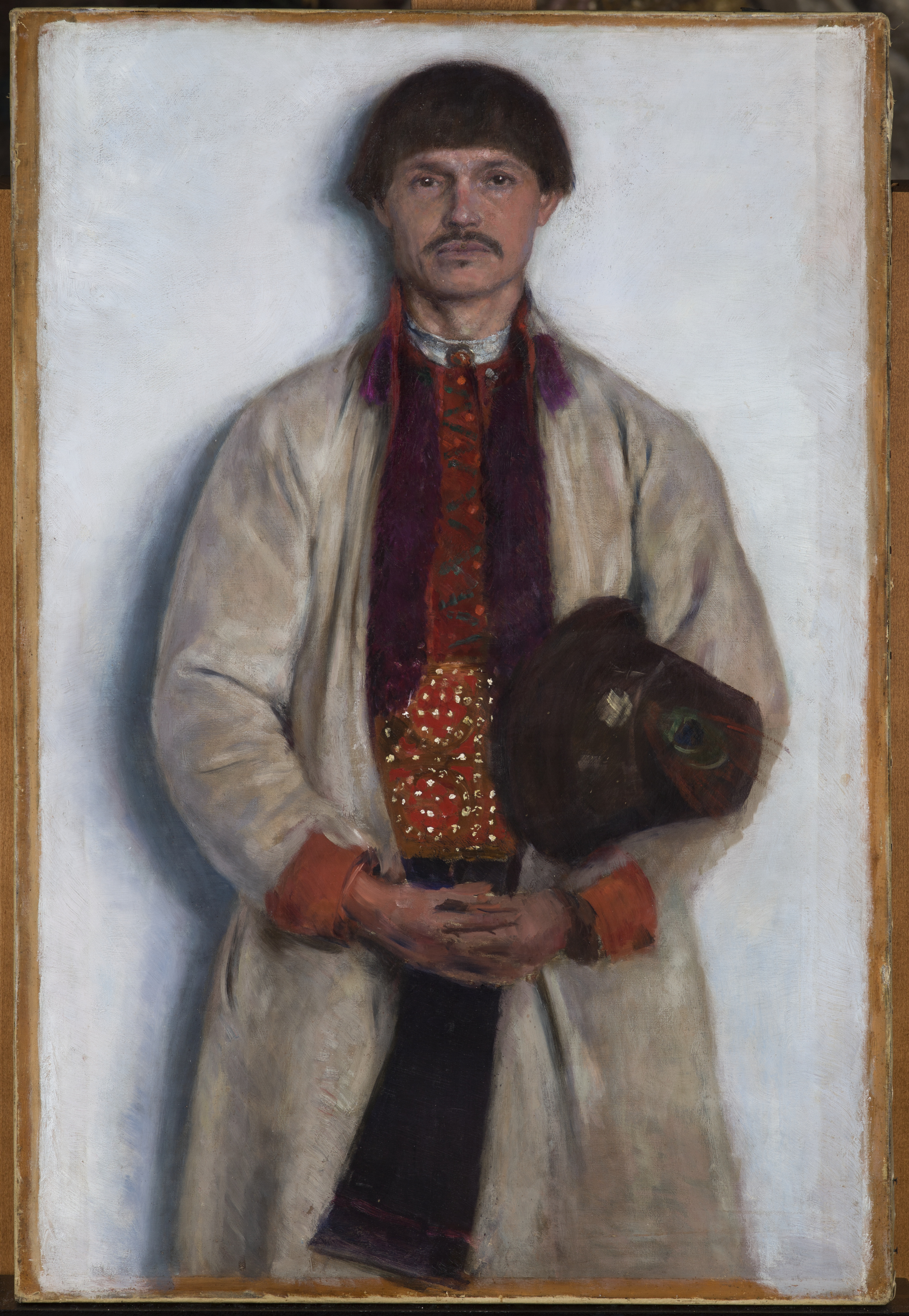
A 19th century Polish peasant with a bowl cut

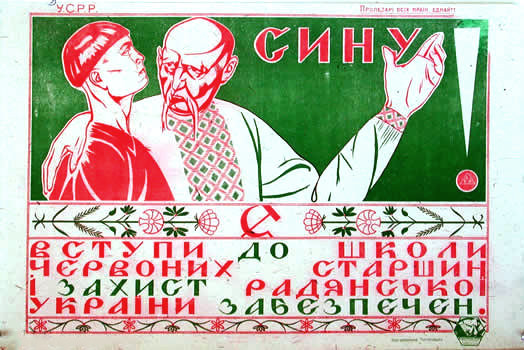
A 1920s Soviet Ukrainian poster; the man on the left sports a bowl cut.

In the United States, the bowl cut was never particularly popular. At least as far back as the 1980s, the cut has been ridiculed by many. It is often mocked via internet memes.

By 2015, the hairstyle was uncommon enough that its use by mass murderer Dylann Roof was considered mildly noteworthy. The Anti-Defamation League has documented its metonymic use by young white supremacists, among whom it represents Roof and his crimes in particular, and white supremacist ideology in general. For example, a neo-Nazi group named itself the "Bowl Patrol" after Roof's bowl cut hairstyle; that group remained active as of a July 2020 exposé in the Huffington Post, five years after the Charleston church shooting.

In 2016, American singer-songwriter Oliver Tree began to appear with a bowl cut. It became his most recognisable asset and he helped repopularise it in the 2020s. He later combined it with a mullet, and wore the style until his death in 2026.

== See also ==
- List of hairstyles
- Czupryna
- Moe Howard
- Bob cut
- Edgar cut

== Works cited ==
- Harmand, Adrien (1929). Jeanne d'Arc: Ses Costumes, Son Armure [Joan of Arc: Her Outfits, Her Armor] (in French). Leroux. OCLC 743097789.
