= Bangs (hair) =

Fringe of hair covering the human forehead

Bangs (North American English) or a fringe (British English, Australian English and New Zealand English) are strands or locks of hair that fall over the scalp's front hairline to cover the forehead, usually just above the eyebrows, though can range to various lengths. While most modern Western hairstyles cut the bangs straight, they may also be shaped in an arc or left ragged.

== Terminology ==
The term bangs originally referred to hair cut bang-off (i.e., straight across at the front), although the term is now applied to diverse forms of hair styling. It is probably related to bang-tail, a term still used for the practice of cutting horses' tails straight across. The term fringe refers to the resemblance of the short row of hair to ornamental fringe trim, such as that often found on shawls.

== History ==
Bangs were worn by both men and women in ancient Egypt, ancient Greece, and in the Roman Empire. Hair styles that included bangs can be seen on men and women in artwork of the Middle Ages. During the Elizabethan era and the Renaissance, European men continued to wear bangs, but they were out of style for women. Clergy cautioned against bangs in the 1600s as a sign of a vanity and "a slide into mortal sin".

Bangs, often curled, regained popularity among women in the Victorian era. The "Alexandra fringe", a mass of short, frizzy bangs named for Alexandra of Denmark, became popular in the 1880s. In the United States during the late 19th and early 20th centuries, bangs were popular among young female immigrants because the hair covering the forehead helped hide skin blemishes such as smallpox scars and acne which, popular magazines assured them, prevented them from looking like authentic Americans.

Bangs continued to remain popular through the twentieth century in various styles, such as the "Dutchboy bob", Mamie Eisenhower's short waved bangs, and Audrey Hepburn's pixie cut. Among men, however, bangs were uncommon. That changed with the rise of British bands such as the Beatles from about 1963 on. Their hairstyles included bangs and became popular with men.

In 2007, bangs saw another massive revival as a hair trend, this time thick, deep and blunt-cut. In October 2007, style icon and model Kate Moss changed her hairstyle to have bangs, signaling the continuation of the trend into 2008. Fringes also had another revival during the 2020s, particularly self-styled curtain bangs, mainly on social media apps such as TikTok.

== Facial structure and fringe design ==
Recent research has emphasized the role of fringe hairstyles in enhancing facial aesthetics and shaping first impressions. A 2022 study by Park and Jang analyzed the relationship between hairline types and fringe styles, noting that hair accounts for over 70% of a person's perceived appearance. The study classified five primary hairline shapes: round, heart, angular, triangular, and flat and proposed corresponding fringe styles to complement each type:

Choppy bangs: Suited for round hairlines; create a youthful, textured look.

Heart bangs: Designed for heart-shaped hairlines with natural partings or swirls.

Feather bangs: Appropriate for angular hairlines; add softness and asymmetry.

Blunt bangs: Ideal for triangular hairlines; convey a bold and structured appearance.

See-through bangs: Matched to flat hairlines; offer a light and airy style that avoids visual heaviness.

These combinations were developed through empirical modeling using wig prototypes and are intended to serve as educational resources in cosmetology and hairstyling.

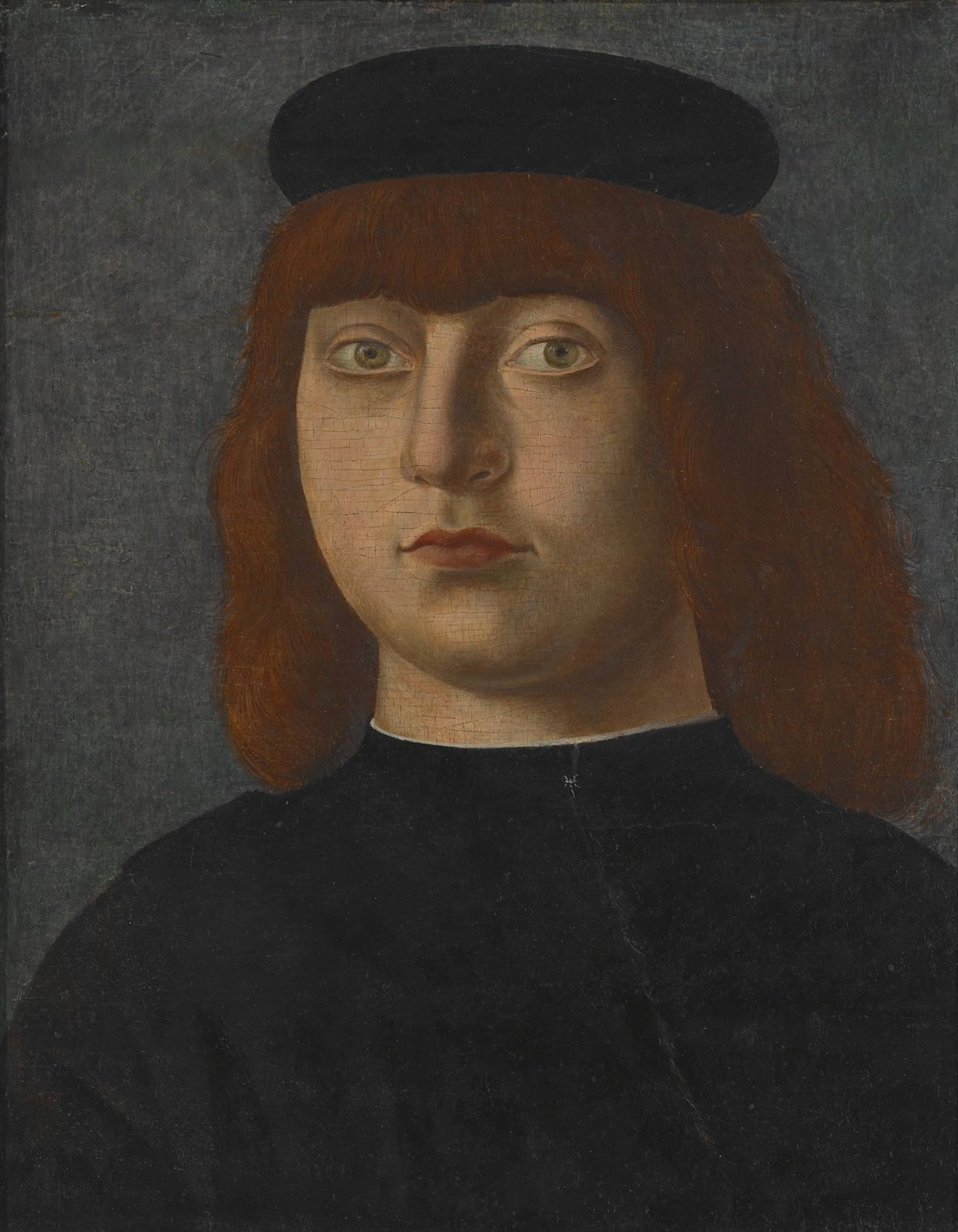
Bangs on a man in portrait, circa 1490–1531

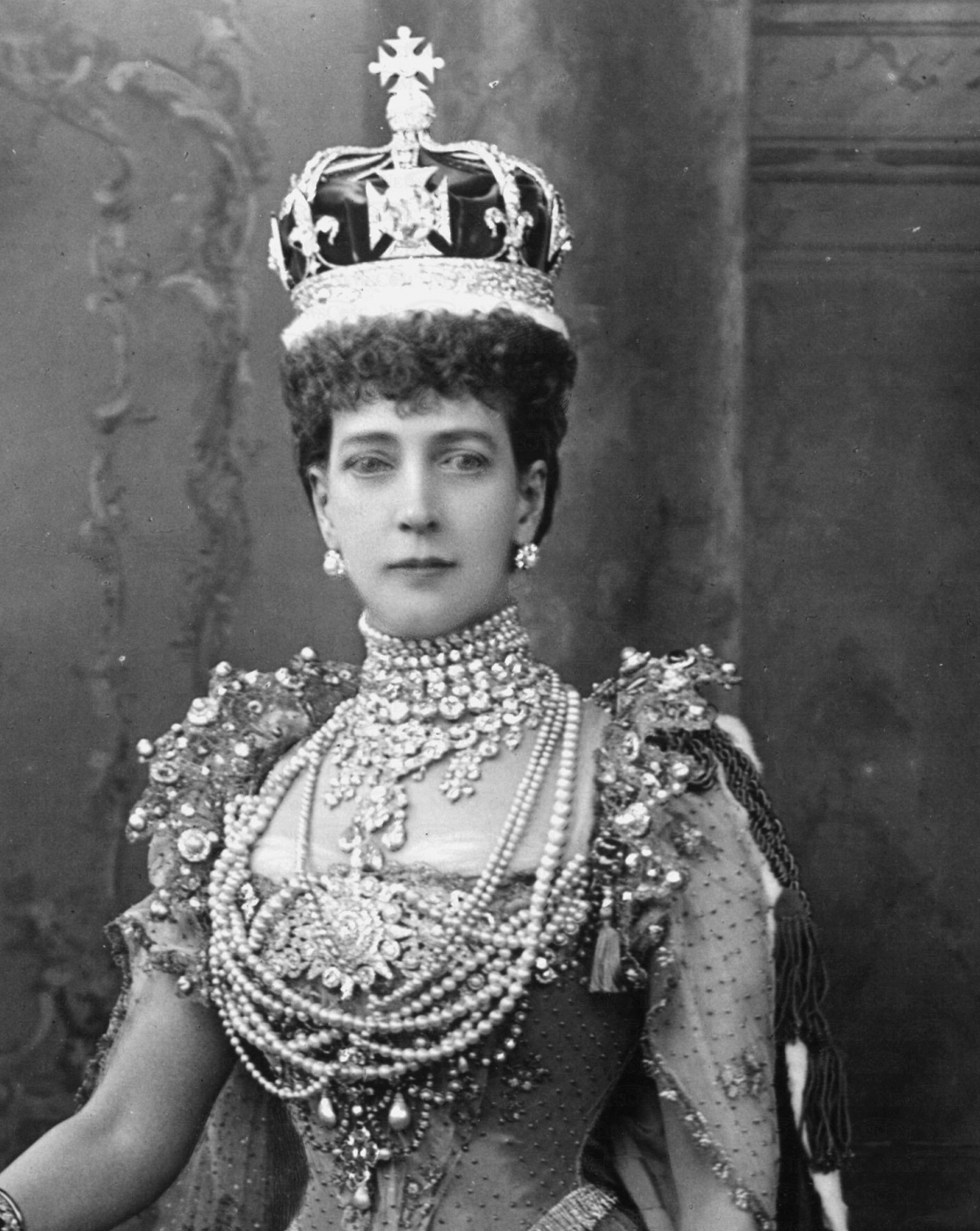
"Alexandra fringe"

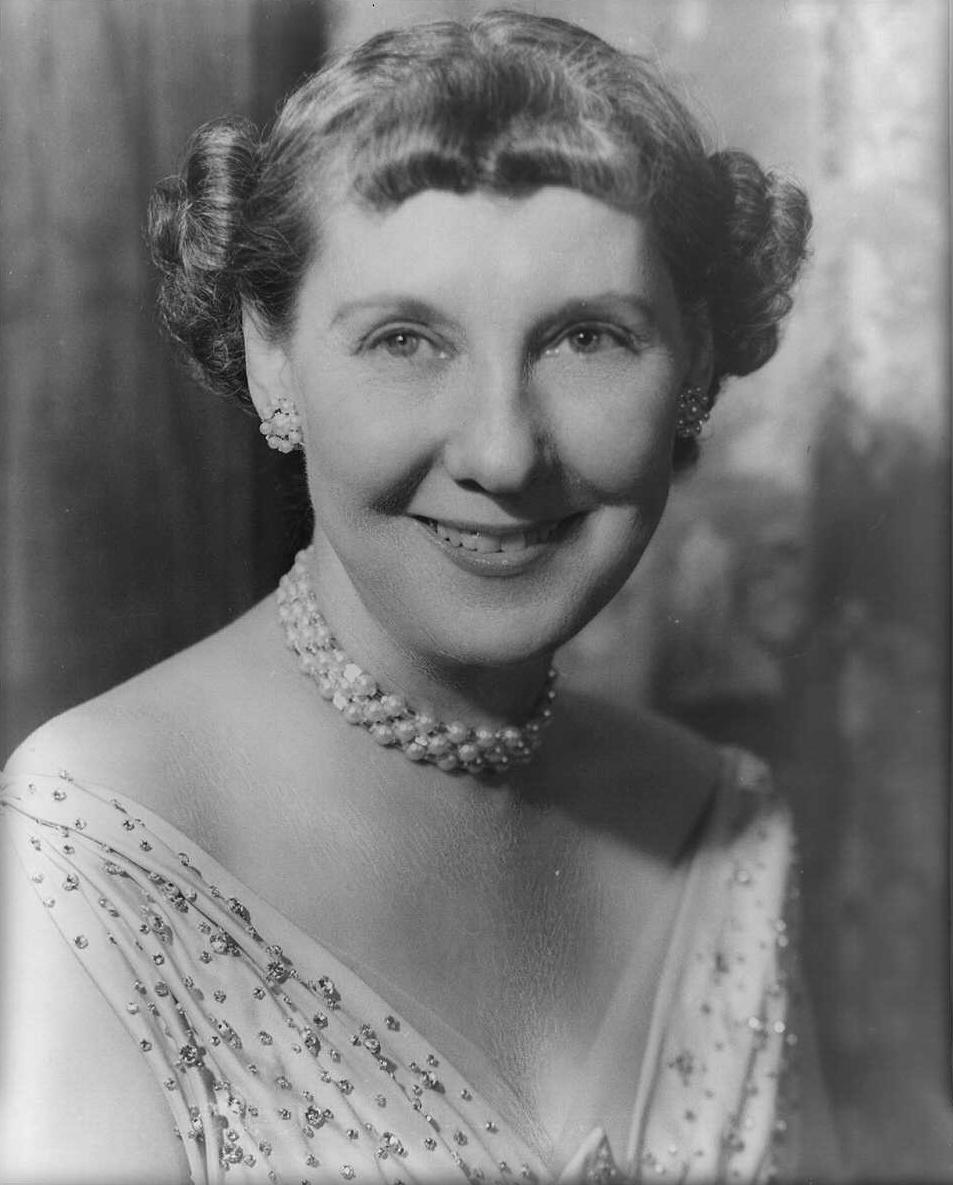
Mamie Eisenhower's bangs

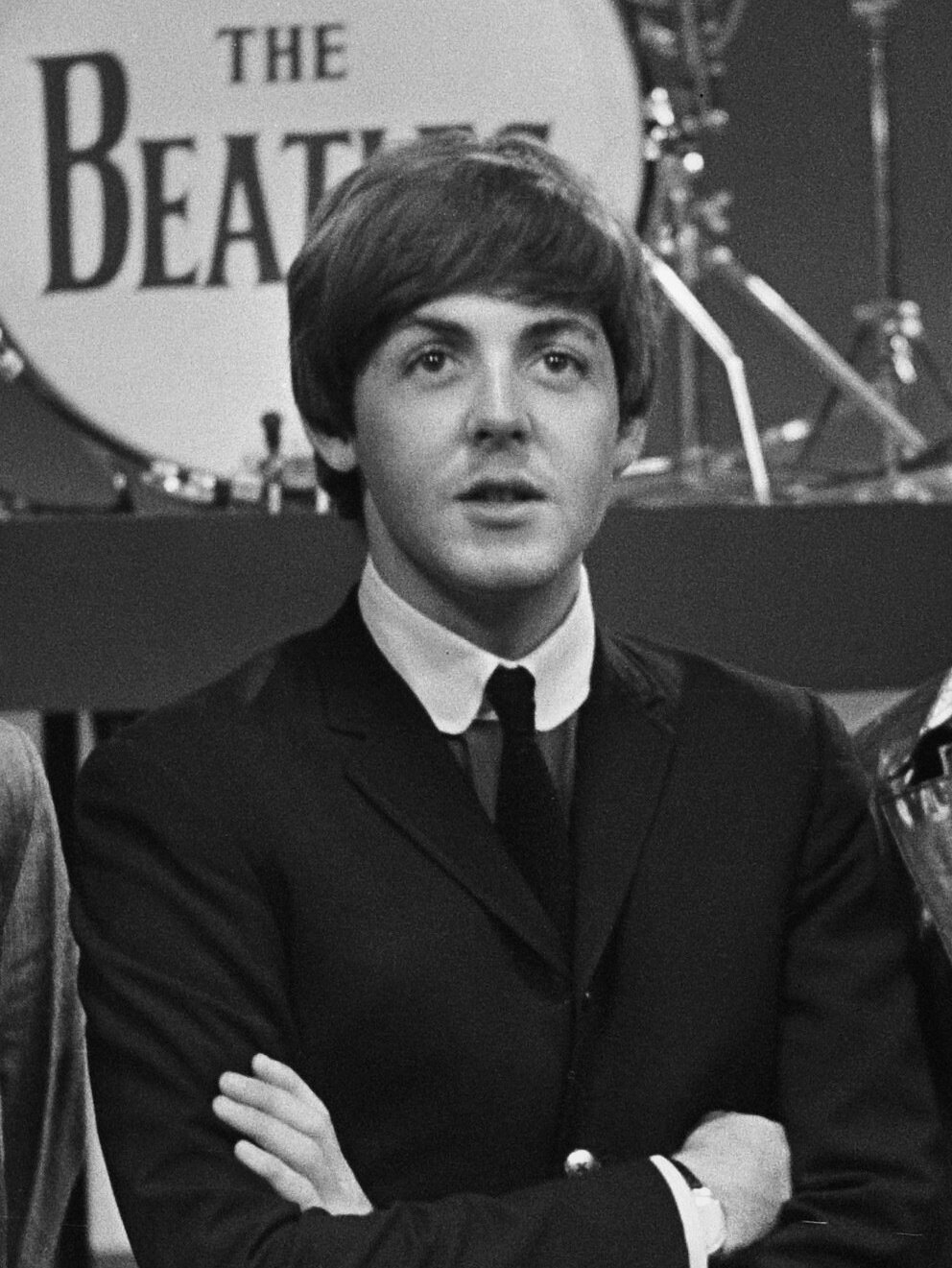
Paul McCartney with "mop-top"-bangs in 1964

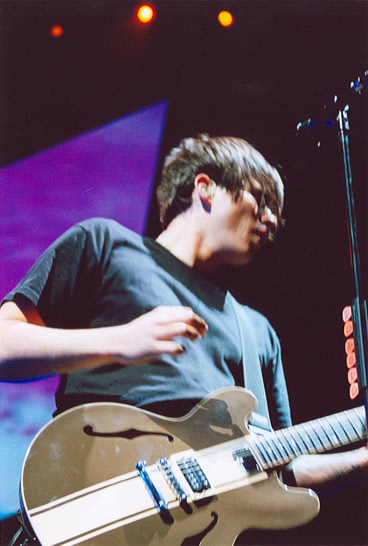
Tom DeLonge with bangs in 2004

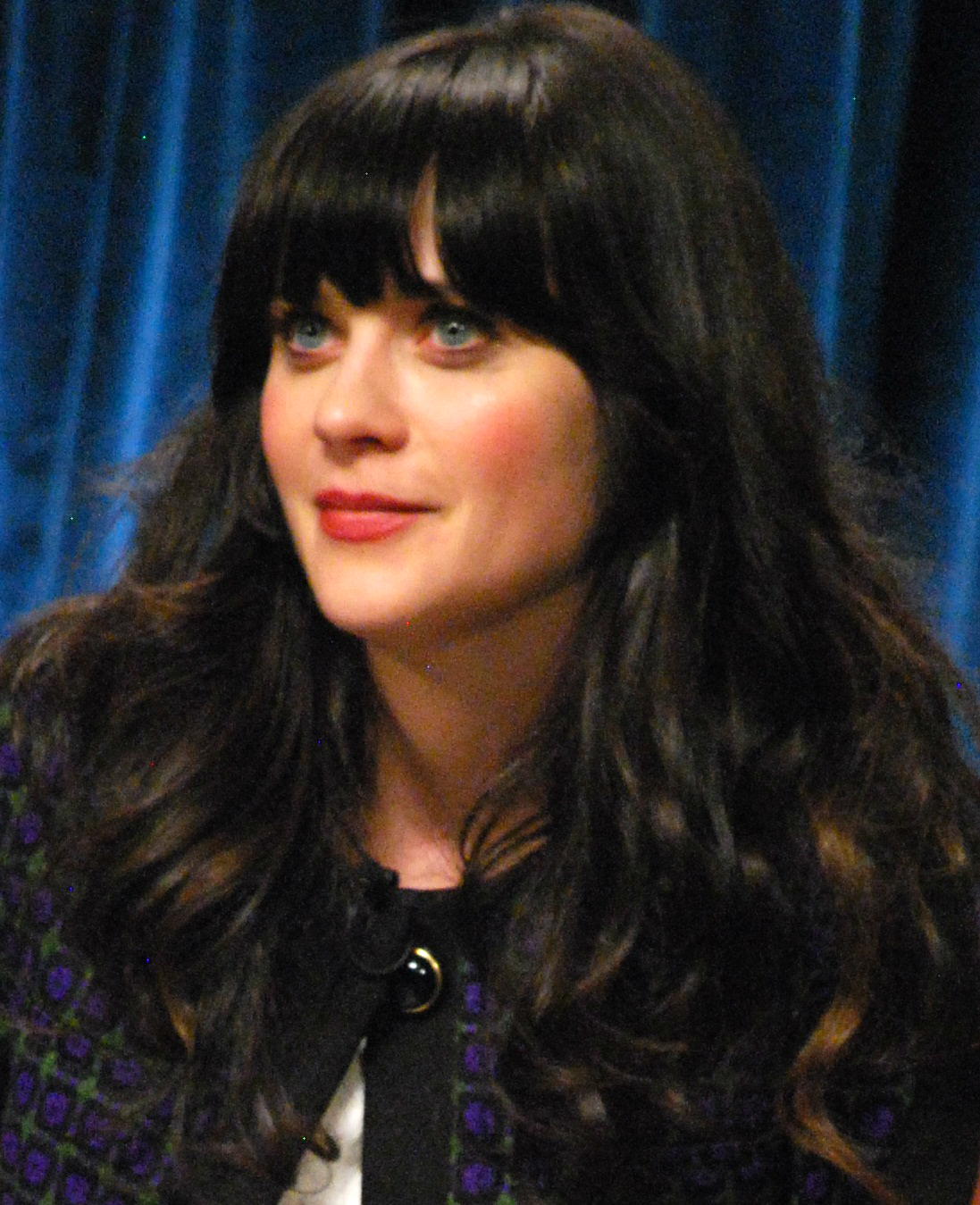
Zooey Deschanel with bangs

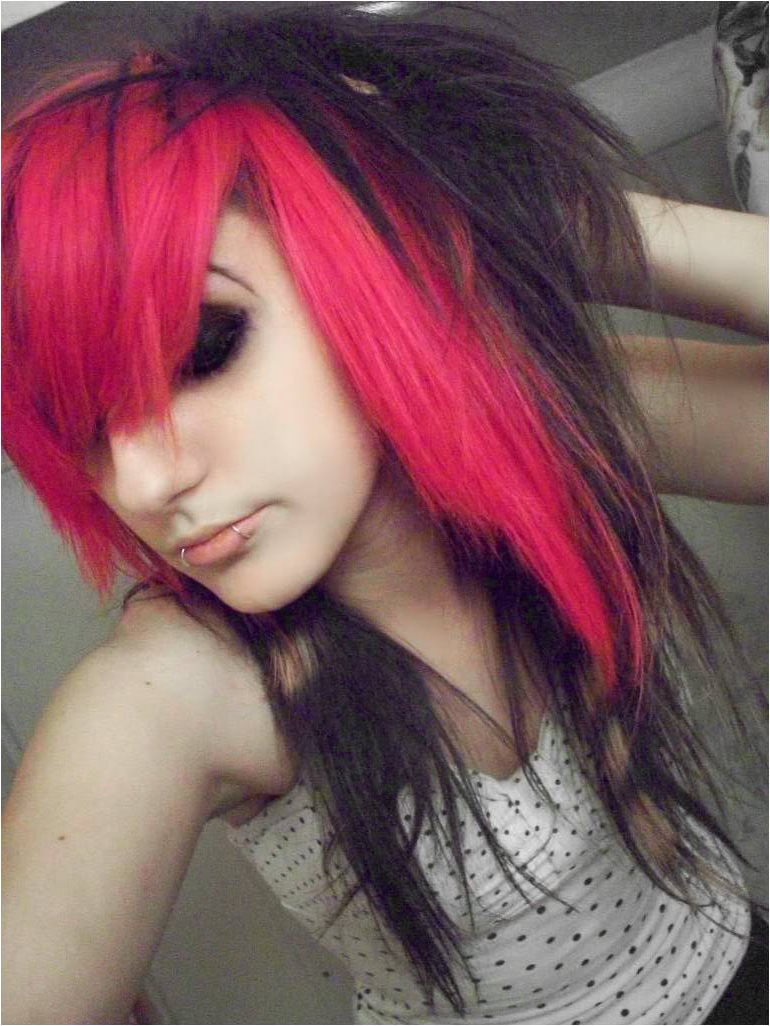
A scene girl with bangs over her eyes

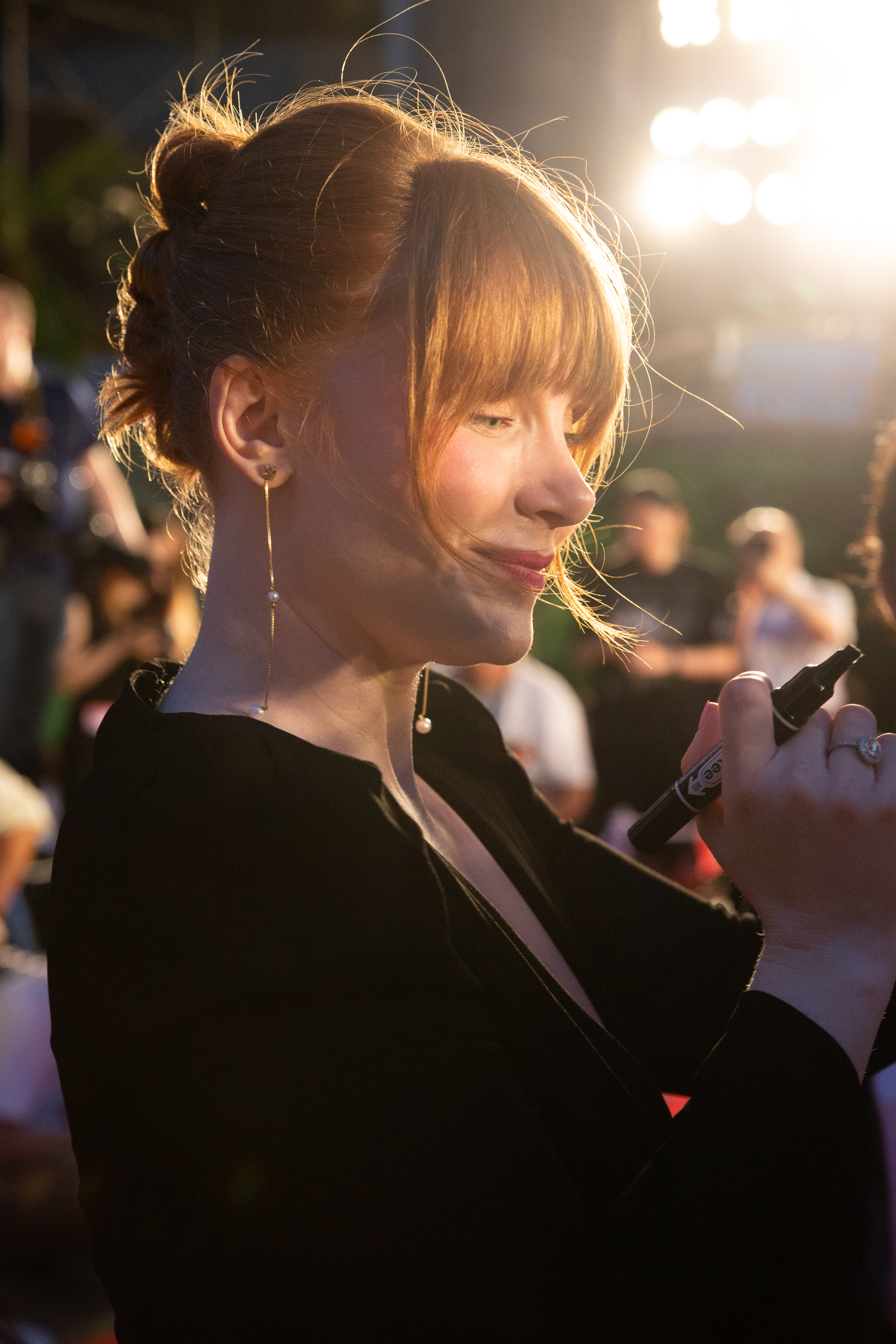
Bryce Dallas Howard with curtain bangs

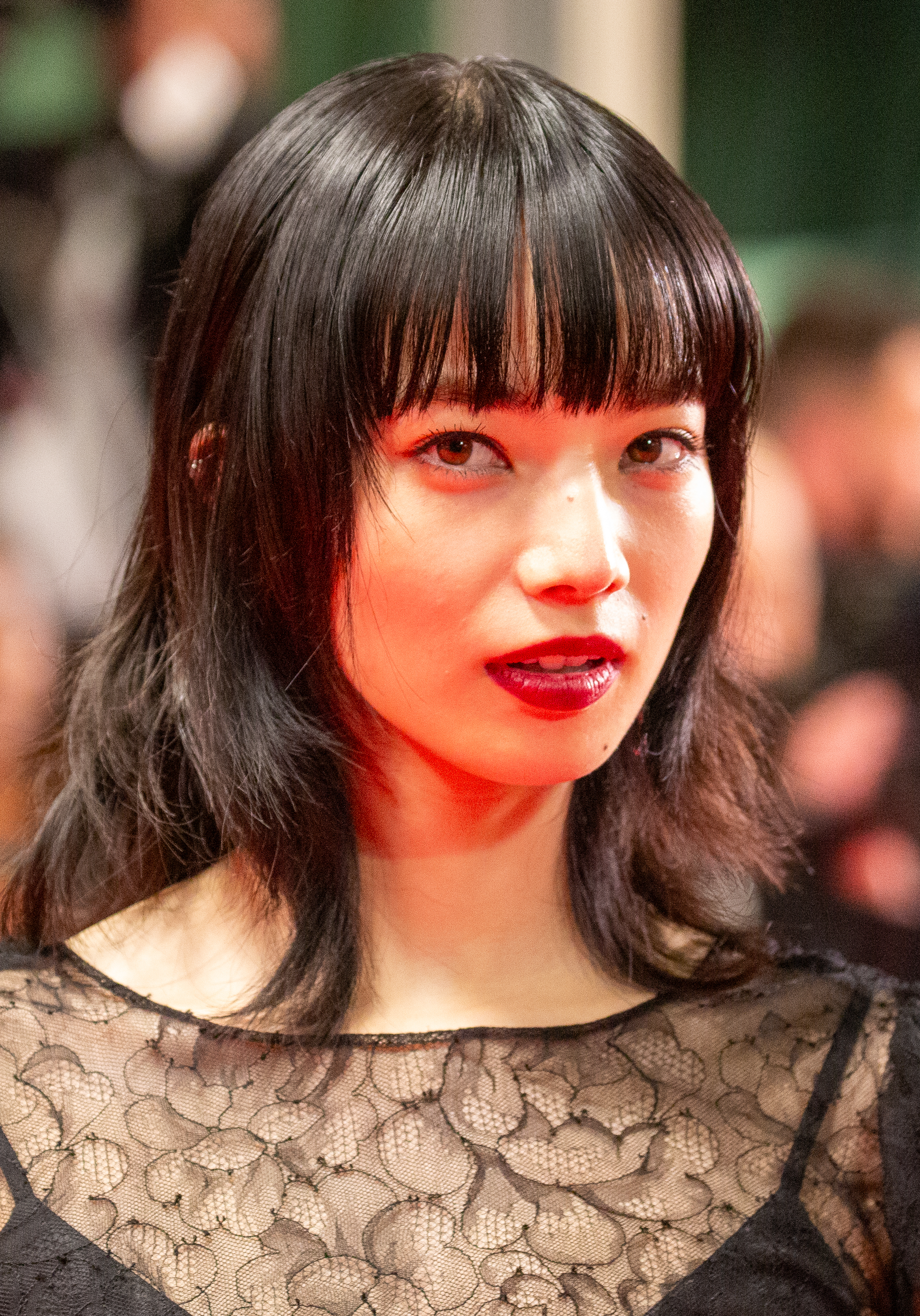
Nana Komatsu with a fringe

== See also ==
- List of hairstyles
- Bowl cut
- Mop top haircut
