= 1990s in fashion =

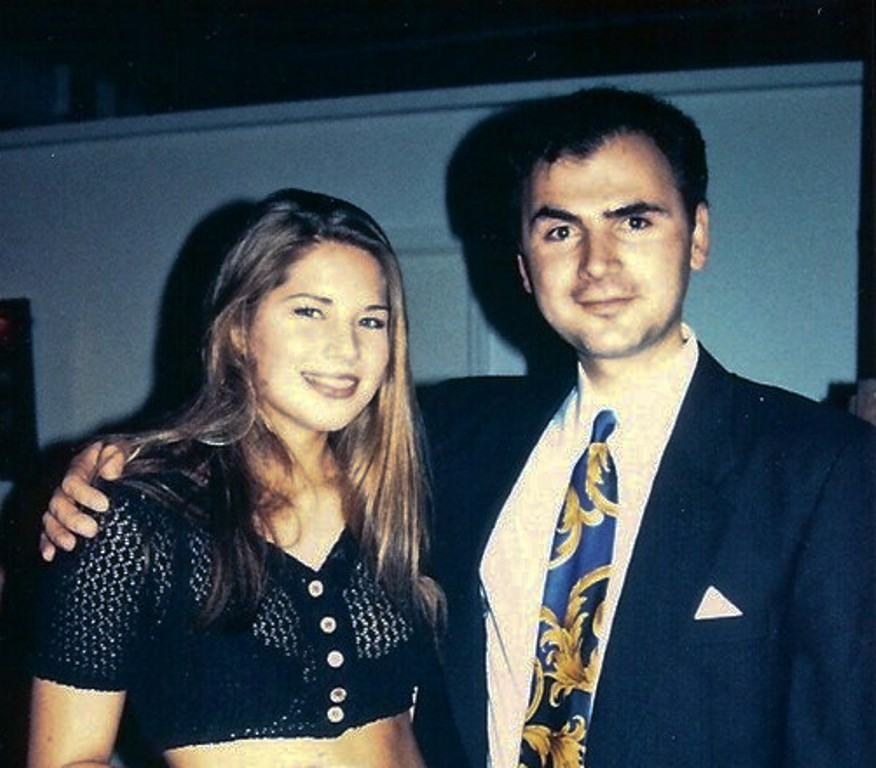
Example of 1990s men's and women's fashion, 1994

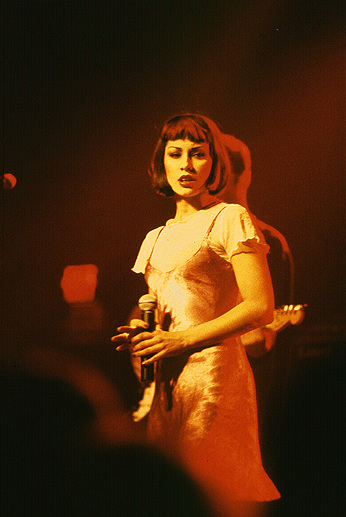
Bob cuts were favored by women. (Saffron, 1996)

Fashion in the 1990s was defined by a return to minimalist fashion, in contrast to the more elaborate and flashy trends of the 1980s. One notable shift was the mainstream adoption of tattoos, body piercings aside from ear piercing and, to a much lesser extent, other forms of body modification such as branding.

In the early 1990s, several late 1980s fashions remained very stylish among men and women. However, the popularity of grunge and alternative rock music helped bring the simple, unkempt grunge look to the mainstream by that period. This approach to fashion led to the popularization of the casual chic look, which included T-shirts, jeans, hoodies, and sneakers, a trend which would continue into the 2000s. Additionally, fashion trends throughout the decade recycled styles from previous decades, most notably the 1950s, 1960s and 1970s.

Unlike the 1980s, when fashion with volume was commonplace, the 1990s were more characterized as a time when fashion was decidedly low maintenance. The 1990s were also a time when more people began to value fashion as an intellectual form. During this period, alternative fashion strategies become part of the commercial format. Resistance to generally accepted fashion trends became one of the basic principles of fashion in the 1990s. Elements of deconstruction in costume became an important element of commercial fashion.

Due to increased availability of the Internet and satellite television outside the United States, plus the reduction of import tariffs under NAFTA, fashion became more globalized and homogeneous in the late 1990s and early 2000s.

== Women's fashion ==
=== Early 1990s (1990–1993) ===
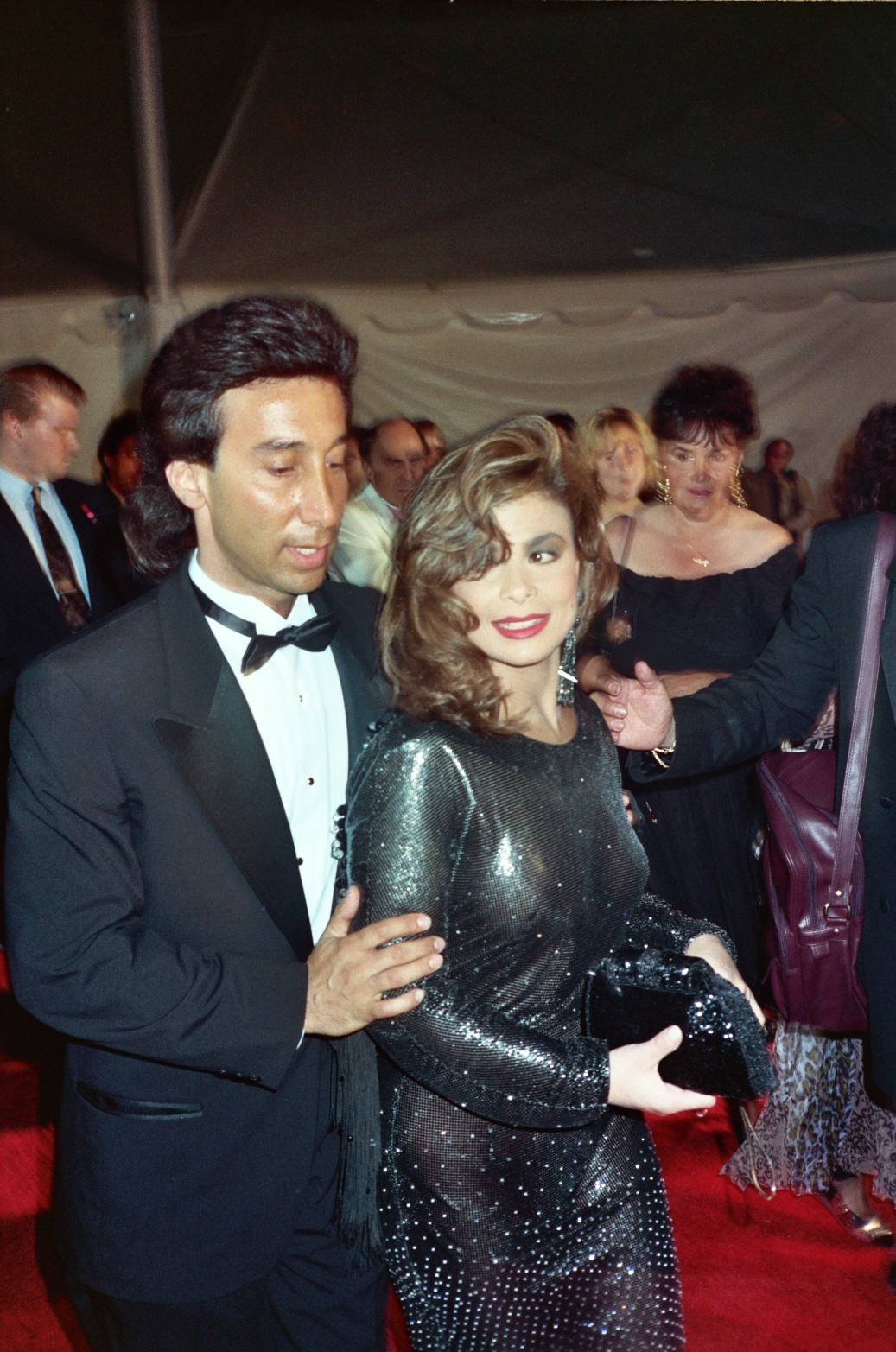
Actress Paula Abdul wearing semi-transparent black dress, curled hair and smoky eye makeup, 1990.

==== Supermodels and high fashion ====
- Throughout the 1990s, supermodels dominated the fashion industry. The top models of the 1990s were Nadja Auermann, Tyra Banks, Christie Brinkley, Carla Bruni, Naomi Campbell, Helena Christensen, Cindy Crawford, Karen Elson, Linda Evangelista, Yasmeen Ghauri, Bridget Hall, Shalom Harlow, Eva Herzigova, Michele Hicks, Kirsty Hume, Milla Jovovich, Yasmin Le Bon, Audrey Marnay, Kristen McMenamy, Kate Moss, Karen Mulder, Carolyn Murphy, Nadège, Erin O'Connor, Kirsten Owen, Tatjana Patitz, Maggie Rizer, Claudia Schiffer, Stephanie Seymour, Tatiana Sorokko, Stella Tennant, Christy Turlington, Amber Valletta, Guinevere Van Seenus, Alek Wek, and Amy Wesson.
- Later in the decade, the rise of Kate Moss shifted the world of fashion when her entrance onto the scene turned the Big Five into the Big Six. Kate Moss became one of the Nineties' biggest phenomena when, at 14 years of age, she was discovered at JFK Airport. Her waif-like figure set a new fashion standard that became known as "heroin chic". This was a pale and ghostly look that called for a stick-thin stature and size zero body. Due to Kate's extremely skinny frame, she was often criticized for allegedly promoting eating disorders as apparently evidenced by her shots for Calvin Klein. Reportedly, posters of Kate Moss were often defaced with graffiti that read "feed me".
- For the 1994 Autumn/Winter issue of Arena Homme +, a spin-off of the bi-monthly Arena (magazine), master fashion photographer Albert Watson photographed a new generation of top male models of the era, including Tyson Beckford, Tim Boyce and Marcus Schenkenberg for the two-page fold-out cover proclaiming "High Five the New Supermodel Army - Malcom Tim, Marcus, In 1995, Gregg and Larry photographed by Albert Watson".

==== Neon colors ====
- In the US, USSR, South Africa, Egypt, and Japan popular trends included bold geometric-print clothing in electric blue, orange, fluorescent pink, purple, turquoise and the acid green exercise wear popularized by Lisa Lopes of TLC. Typical patterns included triangles, zigzag lightning bolts, diamonds, lozenges, rectangles, overlapping free-form shapes, simulated explosions inspired by comic book illustrations or pop art, intricate grids, and clusters of thin parallel lines in contrasting colors (for example, white, black and yellow on a cyan background). Many women wore denim button-down Western shirts, colored jeans in medium and dark green, red, and purple, metallic Spandex leggings, halterneck crop tops, drainpipe jeans, colored tights, bike shorts, black leather jackets with shoulder pads, high waisted ankle length jeans (aka mom jeans) and pants both styled plain or pleated, baby-doll dresses over bike shorts or capri leggings, and skater dresses. Neon colored tops and leg warmers were popular, together with leopard print skirts shiny satin or rayon blouses, embroidered jeans covered in rhinestones, and black or white shirts, leggings and jackets printed with abstract red, blue, yellow and green geometric patterns. In America, popular accessories included court shoes, cowboy boots, headscarves, slouch socks, Keds, ballet flats, and the penny loafers or boat shoes associated with the preppy look.

==== Leggings and exercise-wear ====
- From 1991 on, sports bras, hoodies, shortalls, leotards and bodysuits worn as tops with jeans, a sweatshirt over a turtleneck with jeans rolled up to show off their slouch socks were popular with young girls, teens, college girls, and young women in the UK and Europe. A common outfit was to wear a skirt, dress shorts, babydoll or minidress with black opaque tights. It was not uncommon to see mothers dressed right along with their daughters in white slouch socks worn over black leggings or sweatpants, an oversized T-shirt, sweater or sweatshirt worn over a turtleneck, and Keds, Converse All Stars, or unisex aerobic, basketball or Nike Air or gold Reebok hi-top running shoes. A dressed up leggings outfit was leggings with an oversized v-neck sweater over a turtleneck, slouch socks, Keds or Sperry Top-Sider boat shoes, and bangs with a headband or ponytail and scrunchie. Leggings and stirrup pants worn over pantyhose or tights with a pair of flats and oversized tops were also common. Leggings and slouch socks with oversized tops and casual sneakers especially Keds continued to be worn as lounge wear and everyday comfortable and fashionable casual wear until the late 1990s. In Israel, Britain and the US, Gottex swimsuits became popular among female celebrities Diana, Princess of Wales, Brooke Shields, and Elizabeth Taylor.

==== Grunge ====
- In mid-1992, grunge fashion broke into the mainstream for both sexes. For younger American, Australian and Latina women, it consisted of flannel shirts, ripped jeans, hip hugger bell bottoms, wide leg jeans, shortalls, Doc Martens, combat boots, band t-shirts, small fitted sweaters, cap sleeved shirts, long and droopy skirts, ripped tights, Birkenstocks, hiking boots, and eco-friendly clothing made from recycled textiles or fair trade organic cotton. A prominent example of the popularity of grunge fashion is the teen drama television series "My So Called Life". Grunge fashion peaked in late 1993 and early 1994.

=== Mid-1990s (1994–1996) ===
==== Glamour wear ====
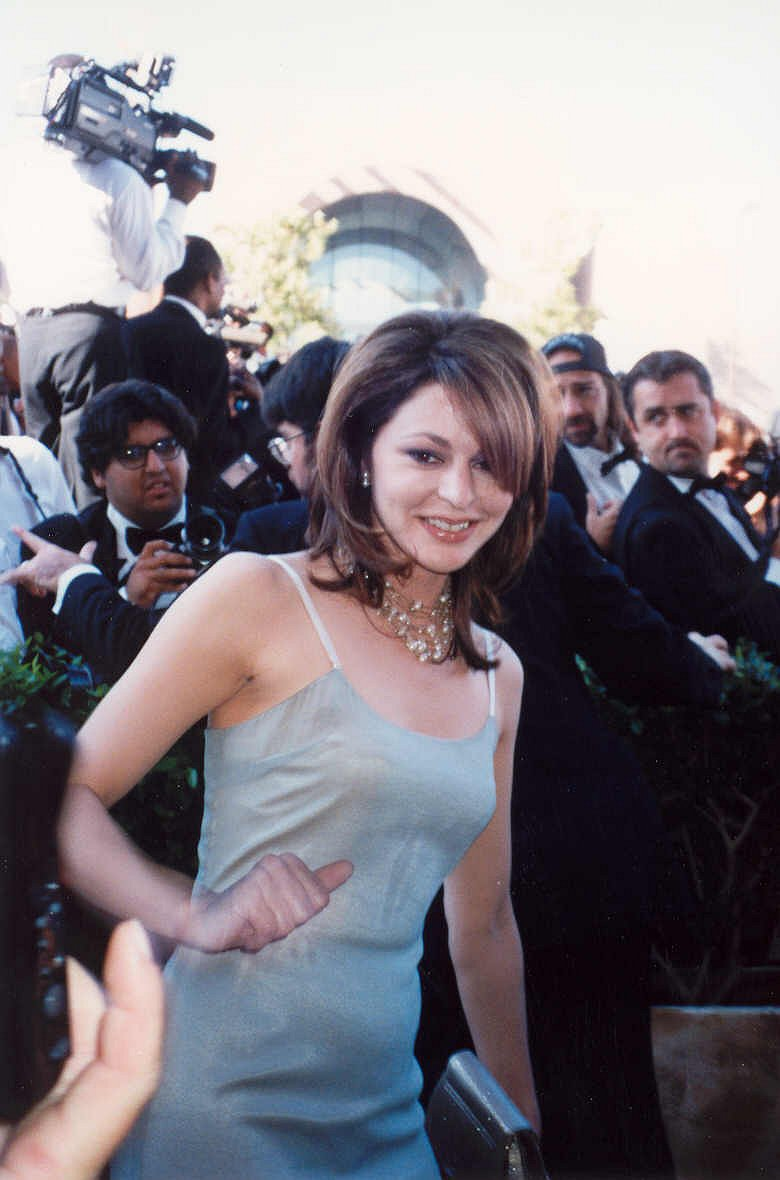
Slip dresses first became widely worn in the mid-1990s, as part of the underwear-as-outerwear trend. (Jane Leeves, 1995)

- In 1994, grunge clothing rapidly declined as fashion became more feminine and form-fitting. Young women in the UK and America wore tailored skirt and trouser suits, short skirts and dresses, baby doll dresses, skater dresses, animal prints, hot pants, slim pants, low waisted bell bottoms, wide leg jeans and pants, long and short skirts, and high heels. High-shine fabrics, such as satin, metallics, sequins, microfiber, vinyl, and silk became very prominent on both clubwear and work wear. The most common look among young women that year was the short black slip dress worn over a tight, undersized white T-shirt. Loungewear generally consisted of black Lycra leggings or bike shorts, large T-shirts, oversized sweatshirts, turtlenecks, and baggy sweaters, slouch socks, Keds, white Sperry sneakers or athletic sneakers and hair in bangs and a ponytail with a scrunchie while at home running errands, at kids sporting events or other clubs and activities or relaxing during the weekends.
- A very popular look among young women from 1994 to 1995 was the "sexy school girl" look. This trend consisted of tartan minikilts, sometimes with bike shorts underneath, undersized sweaters, short slip dresses, baby doll tees, knee highs, pulled all the way up or rolled or folded at the top, thigh highs, miniature backpacks, overalls, tights, pantyhose, shirts and dresses with peter pan style collars and chunky shoes, mary janes, ballet flats, or boat shoes. Hair was down parted in the middle, or worn short and stacked in the back (stacked bob). The sexy school girl look was prominently portrayed in films with female leads such as Clueless, Empire Records, and The Craft.
- Among women over 30, 1950s ladylike fashions made a comeback in the United States. This included pencil skirts, cardigans, girdles, petticoats, satin or lace Wonderbra lingerie, and fitted suits. Popular accessories that went hand-in-hand with this revival included brooches, white gloves, sheer stockings, diamonds, sequins, and red lipstick. For more casual occasions, women opted for lean capri pants, polka dot blouses, belted trench coats, 1940s style sandals, white canvas shoes especially Keds, leggings with oversized tops, slouch socks with leggings, stirrup pants worn over tights or pantyhose with flats and an oversized top, rolled jeans or khakis or shorts or shortalls, shortalls, bell bottoms and wide leg jeans, sweaters, sweatshirts, tunic tops, shorts suit with dress shorts with tights underneath, ballet flats and a top and jacket, above the knee dresses sometimes worn with bike shorts underneath
- Popular shoes and accessories during the mid-1990s in Europe and North America included loafers, Mary Janes, suede sneakers, mules, clogs, knee high boots, jelly shoes, go-go boots, black court shoes, Keds, ballet flats, sperrys and other boat shoes, silver jewelry, dainty earrings and necklaces, conch shell necklaces, berets, straw hats, floppy hats, gold jewelry, and hipster belts. Navel piercings had started to gain popularity around this time.

==== Work wear ====
- For much of the early and mid-1990s, power dressing was the norm for women in the workplace: navy blue, grey or pastel colored skirt suits with shoulder pads, pussy bow blouses, silk scarves, pointed shoes, stretchy miniskirts, polka dot blouses, and brightly colored short dresses worn with a dark brocade blazer, bare legs and metallic open toed shoes. Other 1980s fashions such as chunky jewelry, gold hoop earrings with horn of life pendants, smoky eye make-up, hairspray, Alice bands, and brightly painted nails remained common. Shorts suits were also very popular. They consisted of a regular suit top and jacket and dress shorts in short or bermuda length with tights underneath worn with ballet flats. Also seen were stirrup pants worn over tights or pantyhose with flats and an oversized top.
- By 1996, professional women in Britain, Australia and America wore more relaxed styles and muted colors, such as black floral print dresses, plain kaftan style blouses, Mary Janes, maxi skirts, knee length dresses, boots, smart jeans, big floppy hats, culottes, capri pants and chunky platform shoes. Trouser suits began to replace skirts, black or white tights and nude pantyhose made a comeback.

=== Late 1990s (1997–1999) ===
==== Asian influences ====
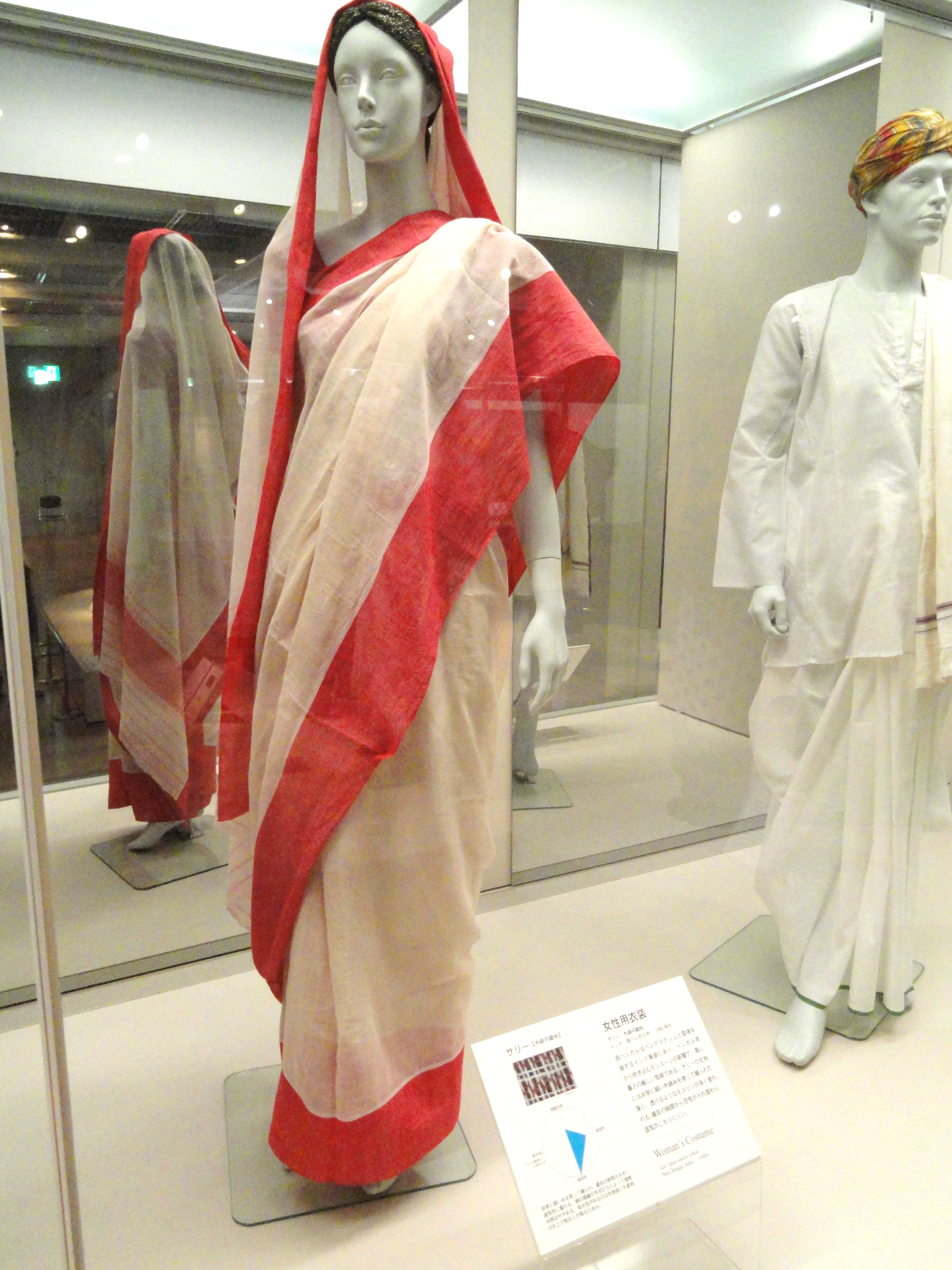
Red and cream Indian woman's saree, late 1990s

- Beginning in 1997 and continuing into the mid-2000s, Southeast Asian and Indian fashion began to influence and gain greater recognition from the global media due to the establishment of the Fashion Design Council of India, and the hosting of India Fashion Week in Delhi. Inspired by Bollywood cinema and a resurgence of interest in 1970s fashion, designers in India adapted and repurposed the saree, churidar and kurta into the Anarkali ballgown from the early 1990s onwards. By the late 1990s, kurta tunics were turned into short dresses, and Manish Arora designed garish Hindu "God printed T-shirts" for both locals and global tourists. British, Asian and American designers also incorporated ethnic chic fabrics, such as khadi, paisley, silk or Indonesian Batik into Western-inspired clothing patterns such as shirts and blouses featuring traditional embroidery. This type of clothing was worn not only by the immigrant Bangladeshi, Pakistani and Indian diaspora in Britain, but also by many non-Indian women.

==== 1970s revival ====
- From 1997 onwards, many British and American designers started to take cues from the disco fashion of the mid–late 1970s. Particularly common were black or dark red pleather pants, animal print clothing, halter tops, metallic clothing, crop tops, tube tops, maxi coats, maxi skirts, knee boots sometimes with knee socks slouch at the top, and boot-cut dress pants. By 2001, popular mainstream trends included tight shirts, bell bottoms, platform shoes, fleeces, cropped tank tops, Union Jack motifs inspired by the Cool Britannia movement, and military inspired clothing, such as flak jackets with camouflage patterns.
- In the late 1990s, bright colors began to make a comeback in mainstream fashion, as a backlash against the darker tones associated with the grunge and skater subculture. Popular colors included plum, chocolate, and navy, all of which replaced black, which had become ubiquitous. Other fashion trends popular from 1997 to 1999 included glamour wear, high-waisted miniskirts, plastic chokers, knee socks associated with the school girl look, tight pants, slip dresses, turtle-neck sweaters, conservative chic, capri pants, high-waisted trousers, and cardigans.
- More formal styles intended for the workplace or special occasions (such as a cocktail party) included silk blouses in neutral colors or animal prints, tailored pantsuits and skirt suits inspired by the 1980s, collarless coats, and the little black dress, with or without subtle embroidery.

==== Casual chic ====
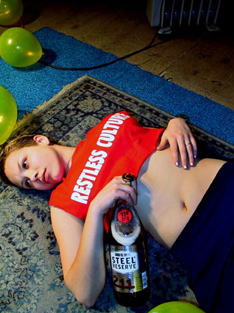
Model wearing a midriff shirt, a silver necklace, low ponytail and straight-leg leggings, 1999.

- From 1998 to 2001, the unisex casual chic look gained mainstream appeal, with dark stonewash jeans, shortalls, spaghetti strap crop tops, tracksuits, sweatpants, and other athletic clothing. Denim's popularity was at an all-time high in Europe, with designer denim jackets and matching jeans rocketing in prices. Other common, more affordable brands included Mudd, JNCO, and Evisu, a Japanese denim brand which launched in the 1980s. The most popular trainers were white or black and manufactured by Adidas, Skechers, and Nike. Running shoes with built in air pumps were popular among both sexes. Leather had largely replaced canvas, and soles were made of foam rather than solid rubber.
- In the US and Britain, popular accessories included large hoop earrings, shoes with rounded toes, flip flops, jelly shoes, rhinestone-encrusted hip belts, embellished slippers, beaded wristbands and lariats, Alice bands, pashminas, fascinators, gold jewelry, moccasin loafers, running shoes, jelly bracelets, bandanas, and novelty Wellington boots with leopard print or zebra stripe patterns.

== Men's fashion ==
=== Early 1990s (1990-1993) ===
==== Casual clothing ====
- Continuing on from the late 1980s, many young men in the US, UK and Europe wore tapered and cuffed high waisted jeans or pants styled plain or pleated with matching denim jackets, Champion brand, Stone Island or Ralph Lauren sweatshirts, polo shirts with contrasting collars, short Harrington jackets, grey Tommy Hilfiger sweaters with prominent logos, oversized Guess (clothing) denim shirts, brightly colored windcheaters especially in yellow or green, Hush Puppies shoes, Sperrys boat shoes, white Sperrys sneakers, V neck sweaters, soccer shorts, white athletic socks worn with black or brown loafers, triple striped tube socks usually folded over at the top, slouch socks, pastel colored three button sportcoats, graphic print T-shirts, tracksuit tops with a vertical contrasting stripe down the sleeve, sweatpants, bomber jackets, pale denim drainpipe jeans as worn by Ewan McGregor in Trainspotting, shiny red or blue rayon monkey jackets, grey or tan leather jackets with shoulder pads, and wool baseball jackets with contrasting sleeves. Short shorts were popular in the early years of the decade, but were replaced with looser and baggier basketball shorts in 1993 when hip-hop fashion went mainstream. Teva sandals were popular in 1993, its trend even endured to early 2000s.

==== Grunge look ====
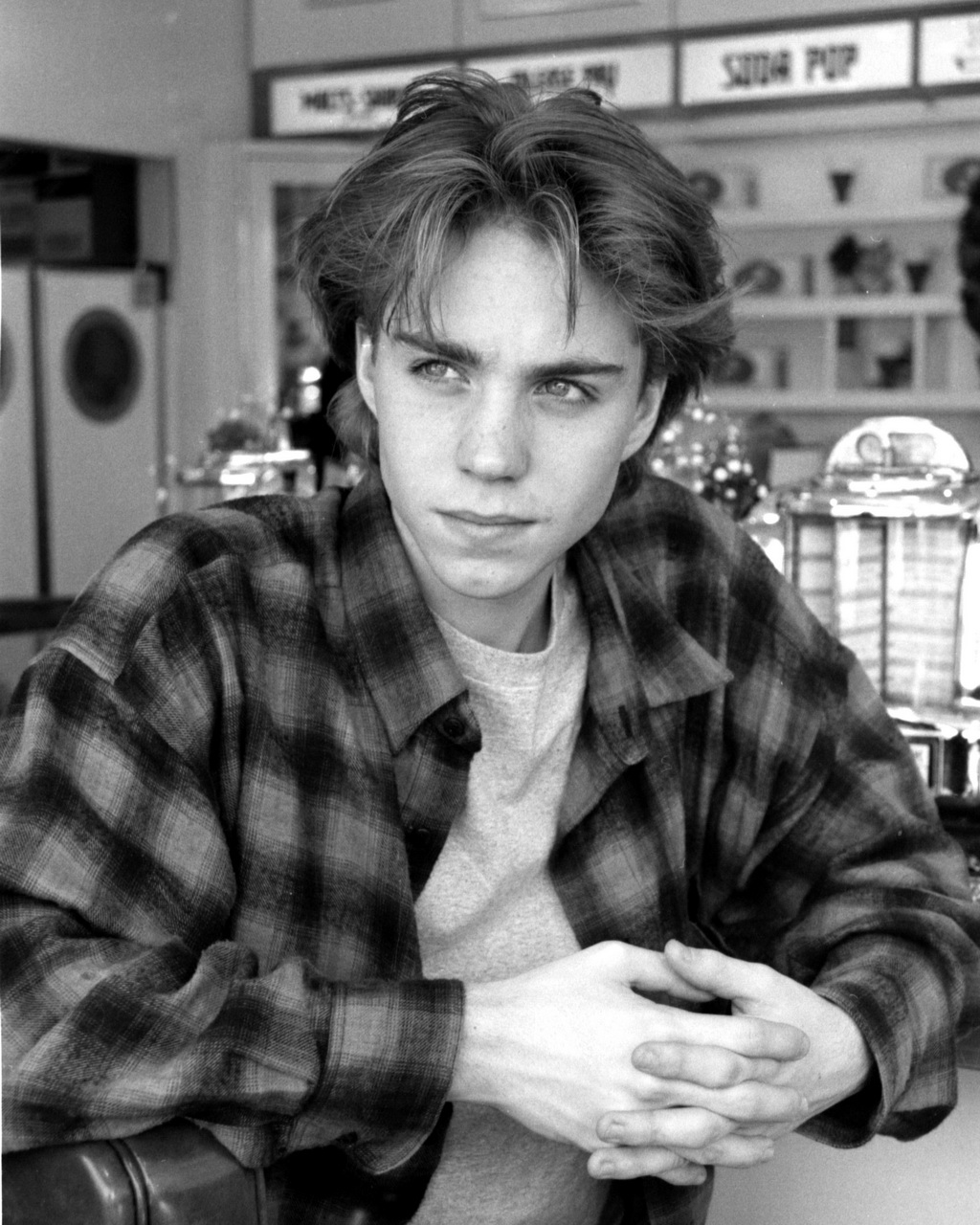
Jonathan Brandis in a Grunge-style flannel shirt and curtained hair in 1993

- From 1991 until 1997, flannel shirts became very popular in the US and Australia, due to their use among the skater subculture and grunge bands including Nirvana or Mudhoney. Unlike the fitted Western shirts of the 1970s which fastened with pearl snaps, the flannel shirts of the 1990s were padded and loose-fitting for optimum warmth. Men also wore acid wash jeans, patterned wool sweaters with turtlenecks underneath, black Schott Perfecto leather jackets, sheepskin coats, olive green anoraks, corduroy sportcoats, grey sweatpants and fingerless gloves.
- In the US, popular accessories included Converse All Stars, hi-top Nike's, trapper hats, bucket hats, baseball caps, baggy, graphic T-shirts, oversized sweatshirts, tuques, combat boots, Dr. Martens, and Aviator sunglasses.

=== Mid-1990s (1994–1996) ===
==== Cool Britannia and 1960s–70s revival ====
- Around 1995/1996, 1960s mod clothing and longer hair were popular in Britain, Canada, and the US due to the success of Britpop. Men wore Aloha shirts, brown leather jackets, velvet blazers, paisley shirts, throwback pullover baseball jerseys, and graphic-print T-shirts (often featuring dragons, athletic logos or numbers). Real fur went out of fashion and fake fur became the norm.
- The 1970s became a dominant theme for inspiration on men's apparel in 1996. Among these clothing styles were coats with fur- or faux fur-trimmings, jackets with bold shoulders and wide lapels, and boot-cut slacks. This continued into the 2000s (decade). Casual clothes such as trousers, sweaters, and denim jackets were worn with shirts made of satin, PVC, and terry cloth. Both pastel colors and bold patterns were popular and successfully replaced black.
- Desirable accessories during the mid-1990s included loafers, desert boots, chelsea boots, gold jewellery, boat shoes, chunky digital watches, solid colored ties, shoulder bags, and black/neon colored high-top sneakers replaced combat boots.

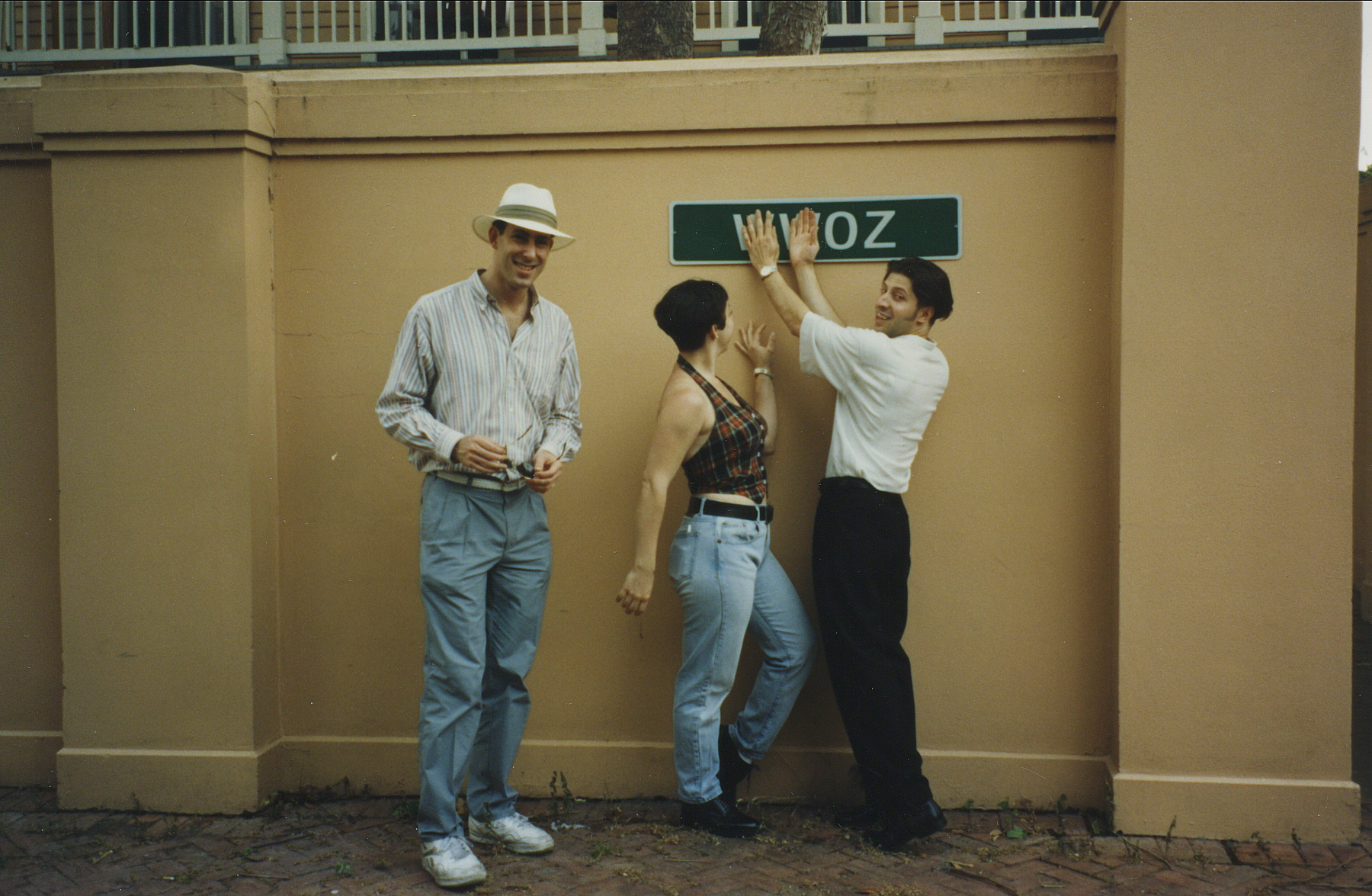
Trio in 1995 wearing neutral-colored tops and relaxed-fit, slim-leg pants and jeans.

==== Modern preppy ====
- Preppy clothing was popular in the US, where wealthy young men wore khaki slacks, canvas boat shoes, and navy blue blazers with breast-pocket monogram or gold buttons bearing a family crest. In general, 1990s preppy was more casual than the almost dandified look of the 1980s as young men abandoned ascots and Oxford shoes in favor of Nantucket Reds, nautical-striped T-shirts, boat shoes i.e. Sperrys, loafers, white style casual sneakers, slouch socks, and madras cloth or gingham short-sleeved shirts. Desirable brands included Gap, Old Navy and Abercrombie & Fitch.

==== Hip-hop ====
- In Europe and North America, hip-hop fashion went mainstream in 1992, with oversized baseball jackets, baggy jeans, bomber jackets, Baja Jackets, and tracksuits popular among young men as casual wear. Simultaneously, industrial and military styles crept into mainstream fashion, with machinery pieces becoming accessories. Baseball caps started being worn forwards again.
- The eight-ball jacket created by designer Michael Hoban became popular in hip-hop fashion, particularly the East Coast hip-hop scene of New York City. The style is characterized by bright color-blocking and large black and white decals on the back and sleeves, made to look like the eight ball used in some cue sports.
- Southern hip-hop provided a platform for fashion designers and musical artists to collaborate forming an influential subculture of anti fashion and alternative fashion designs, especially the popular recycled clothing worn by Arrested Development and Goodie Mob.
- Due to its association with rappers, sportswear became acceptable to wear in public throughout the mid- to late 1990s, especially oversized T-shirts, baseball caps and sweaters bearing the New York Yankees logo, tennis shoes, hoodies, jean shorts, khaki cargo pants, baggy basketball shorts, chinos, tracksuits and black bomber jackets with orange linings. From 1995 onwards, men wore overalls, straight leg jeans, plaid pants, flat-front chinos, khaki pants, and camouflage pants worn ironically by anti-war protesters.
- In the late 1990s ski goggles became a popular accessory in hip-hop fashion.
- Hip-hop and rap artists influenced the fashion scene with oversized streetwear, making a mark on their fans sense of style. Some artists and music groups include Bones Thugs-n-Harmony, Boyz II Men, Notorious BIG, NWA, Tupac Shakur, and many more.

=== Late 1990s (1997–1999) ===
==== African fashion ====
- During the mid- and late 1990s, the silk Madiba shirt became popular in South Africa and the wider global community. From 1996 to 1998, traditional African clothing began to face serious competition from cheap imported mitumba clothing as a consequence of the Kenyan and Tanzanian government's easing of trade restrictions during the early to mid-1990s. By the end of the decade, the safari jacket associated with kleptocrat dictator Mobutu Sese Seko of the Democratic Republic of the Congo and the previous South African Apartheid regime had declined in popularity, and was replaced as formal wear by the dashiki suit. Variants in green, yellow and black were worn as an alternative to the business suit by many African-Americans for Kwanzaa. African art began to influence and gain greater recognition on account of the Festival de la Mode Africaine (FIMA). These influences started to make their way into fashion shows all over, for reference New York fashion week, 1998. In this show models were wearing sheath-like dresses made of loosely knitted yarn and denim jackets with large fake fur collars. Loose threads dangled from some of the garment's seams and other garments had the labels sewn on the outside of the collars.

==== Streetwear ====
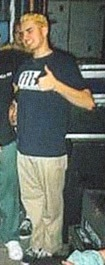
Typical late 1990s fashions, 1997.

- By the late 1990s, the grunge look became unfashionable, and there was a revival of interest in streetwear clothing, with name brand designers such as Calvin Klein and Ralph Lauren making a comeback. In Europe, jeans were more popular than ever before. From 1997 to 1998 brighter colors came into style, including plum, charcoal, olive, wine, and shades such as "camellia rose", "blazing orange", "whisper pink", "hot coral", and a light-grayish blue called "wind chime".
- Much of men's fashion in 1997 was inspired by the 1996 film Swingers, leading to the popularization of the "dressy casual" look. Such apparel included blazers, black or red leather jackets and bowling shirts in either a variety of prints or a solid color, and loose-fitting flat-front or pleated khaki chinos or jeans. Around this time it became fashionable to leave shirts untucked.

==== Business wear ====
- In Europe, single-breasted three and four button notch lapel suits in grey or navy blue, together with leather jackets based on the same cut as blazers, began to replace the double breasted 1980s power suits. The wide neckties of the early 1990s remained the norm, but the colors became darker and stripes and patterns were less common. In India and China, the Nehru suit and Mao suit declined in popularity in favor of conventional Western business wear. Tweed cloth and houndstooth sportcoats went out of fashion due to their association with older men. Dress shoes (usually in black) included chelsea boots with rounded or square toes, wingtips, and monkstraps.
- In America, an increasing number of men began to dress smart-casual and business casual, a trend kickstarted by Bill Gates of Microsoft. At more formal events such as weddings or proms, men often wear boxy three or four button, single-breasted suits with a brightly colored tie and an often matching dress shirt. Another trend was to wear black shirts, black ties, and black suits. Black leather reefer jackets and trenchcoats were also fashionable in the late 1990s, the latter inspired by The Matrix.

== Youth fashion ==
=== General trends ===
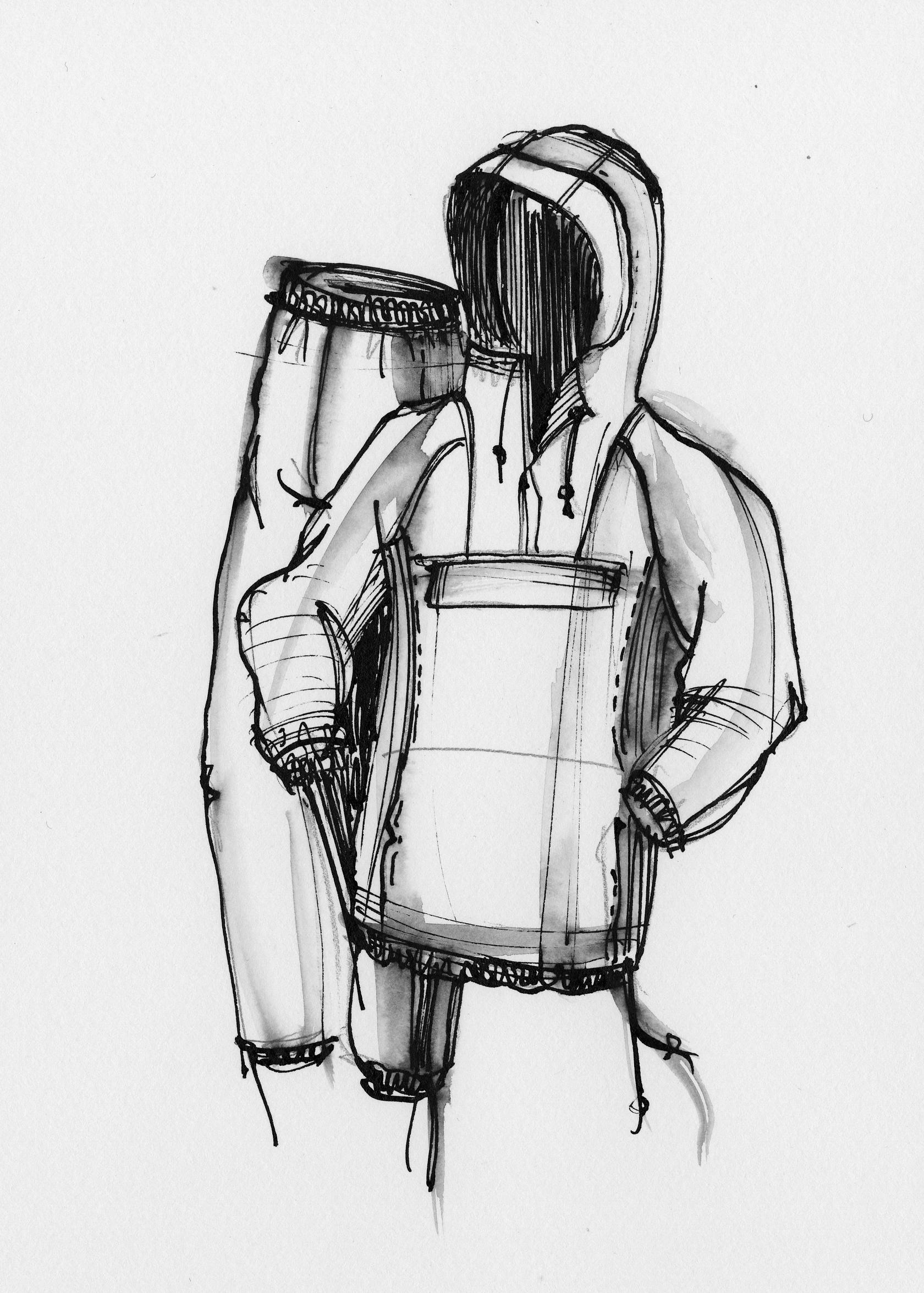
Tracksuit

- For much of the 1990s, particularly the middle years, teenage boys and girls bought and wore very simple clothes, such as shortalls, flannel shirts, athletic shorts, dress shorts short or bermuda length, track suits, high-waisted ankle length jeans and pants usually at least to the belly button, plain or pleated, leggings, bike shorts, stretch pants and stirrup pants, oversized shirts, sweaters and sweatshirts, slouch socks, striped tube socks sometimes folded down at the top, above the knee slip dresses with a capped sleeved tee usually white or capped sleeved bodysuit underneath, babydoll dresses above the knee with opaque tights, leggings or bike shorts showing, bodysuits as tops, jogger pants and turtlenecks. Popular shoe brands or styles included Keds, canvas and leather Converse Chuck Taylor All-Stars, ballet flats, and boat shoes. Popular stores selling these items included Gap, Old Navy, Urban Outfitters, JCPenney and Kohls.
- The 1990s was the Golden Age of Disney films. T-shirts and sweaters featuring characters such as Simba, Mickey Mouse, Belle, Aladdin, and Winnie the Pooh were popular among young children.

== Subcultures of the 1990s ==
=== Grunge ===
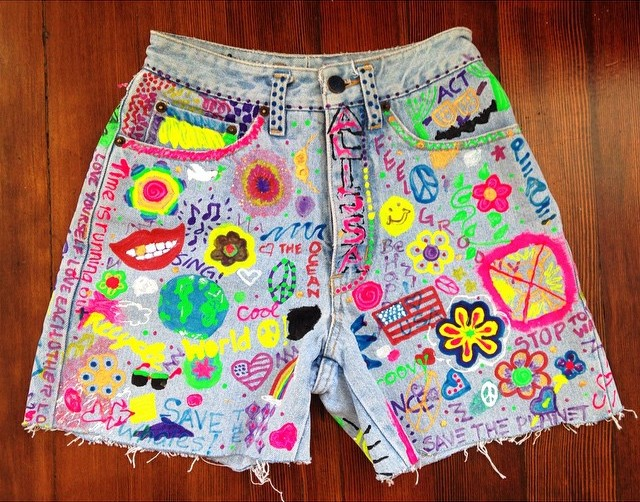
Acid washed jean shorts with grunge and hippie inspired DIY slogans and symbols.

- The new wave and heavy metal fashion of the 1980s lasted until 1992, when Grunge and hip-hop fashion took over in popularity. By the mid-1990s the grunge style had gone mainstream in Britain and the US, and was dominated by tartan flannel shirts and stonewashed blue jeans.
- Grunge fashion remained popular among the skater subculture until the late 1990s as the hard-wearing, loose-fitting clothing was cheap and provided good protection. Members of the subculture were nicknamed grebos or moshers and included those who did not skate.

=== Psychobilly, punk and skater ===
- Hardcore punk fashion, which began in the 1970s, was very popular in the 1990s, especially among the skater subculture. Common items for pop-punk and nu metal fans included bright colored/blond tipped spiky hair, long under sleeves, black hoodies, and baggy pants in black, mint blue, or red Royal Stewart tartan.

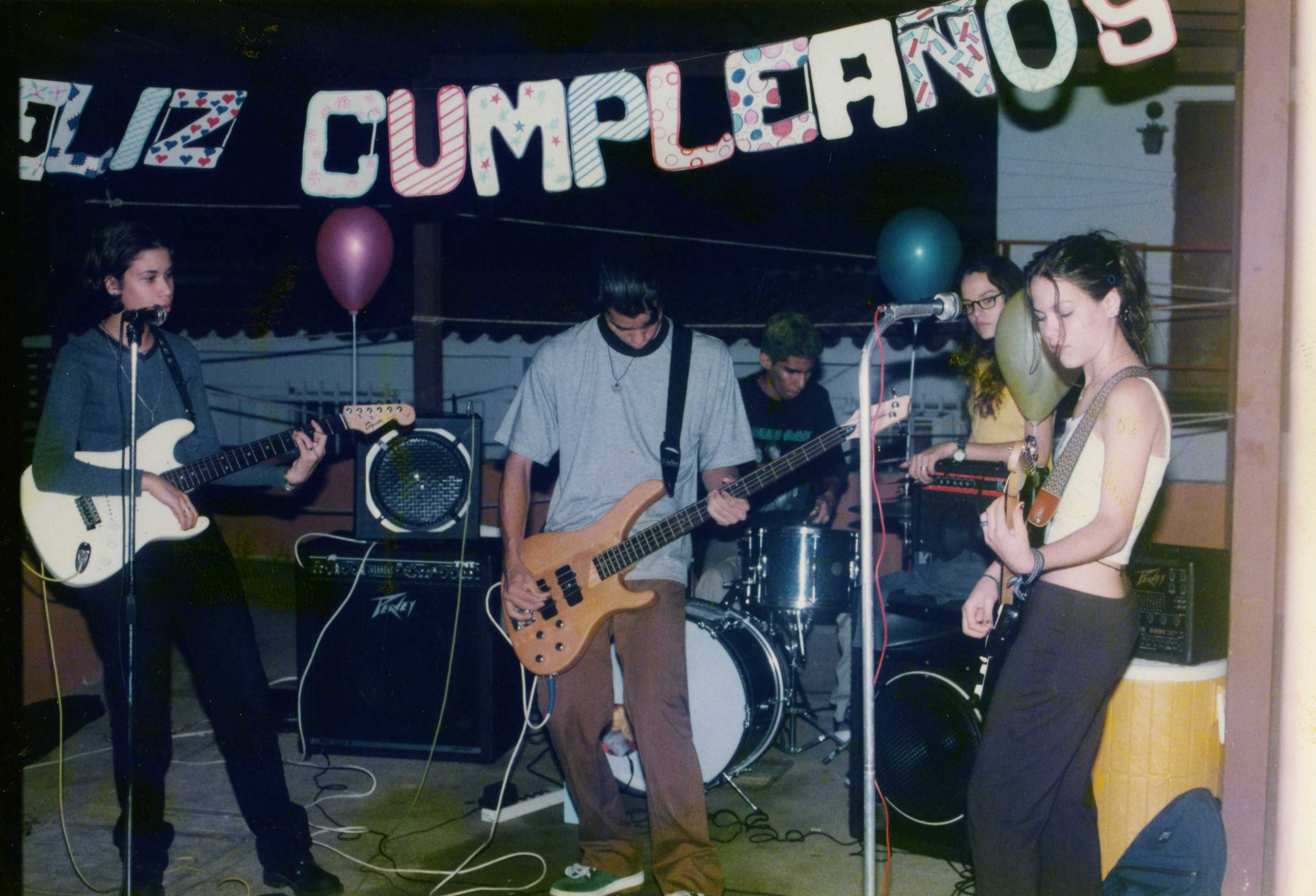
Garage punk band, 1997

- In the US, psychobilly bands Reverend Horton Heat and Rocket from the Crypt popularized brothel creepers, gas station shirts and dark-colored bowling shirts during the late 1990s.

=== Rave culture and clubwear ===
- Popular fashion themes of the rave subculture during the early 1990s included plastic aesthetics, various fetish fashions especially PVC miniskirts and tops, DIY and tie dye outfits, vintage 1970s clothing, second-hand optics, retro sportswear (such as Adidas tracksuits), and outfits themed around sex (showing much skin and nudity, e.g. wearing transparent or crop tops), war (e.g. in the form of combat boots or camouflage trousers), postmodernism and science fiction themes. In the early 1990s the first commercial rave fashion trends developed from the underground scene, which were quickly taken up by the fashion industry and marketed under the term clubwear. Common raver fashion styles of the 1990s included tight-fitting nylon shirts, tight nylon quilted vests, bell-bottoms, neoprene jackets, studded belts, platform shoes, jackets, scarves and bags made of flokati fur, fluffy boots and phat pants, often in bright and neon colors.

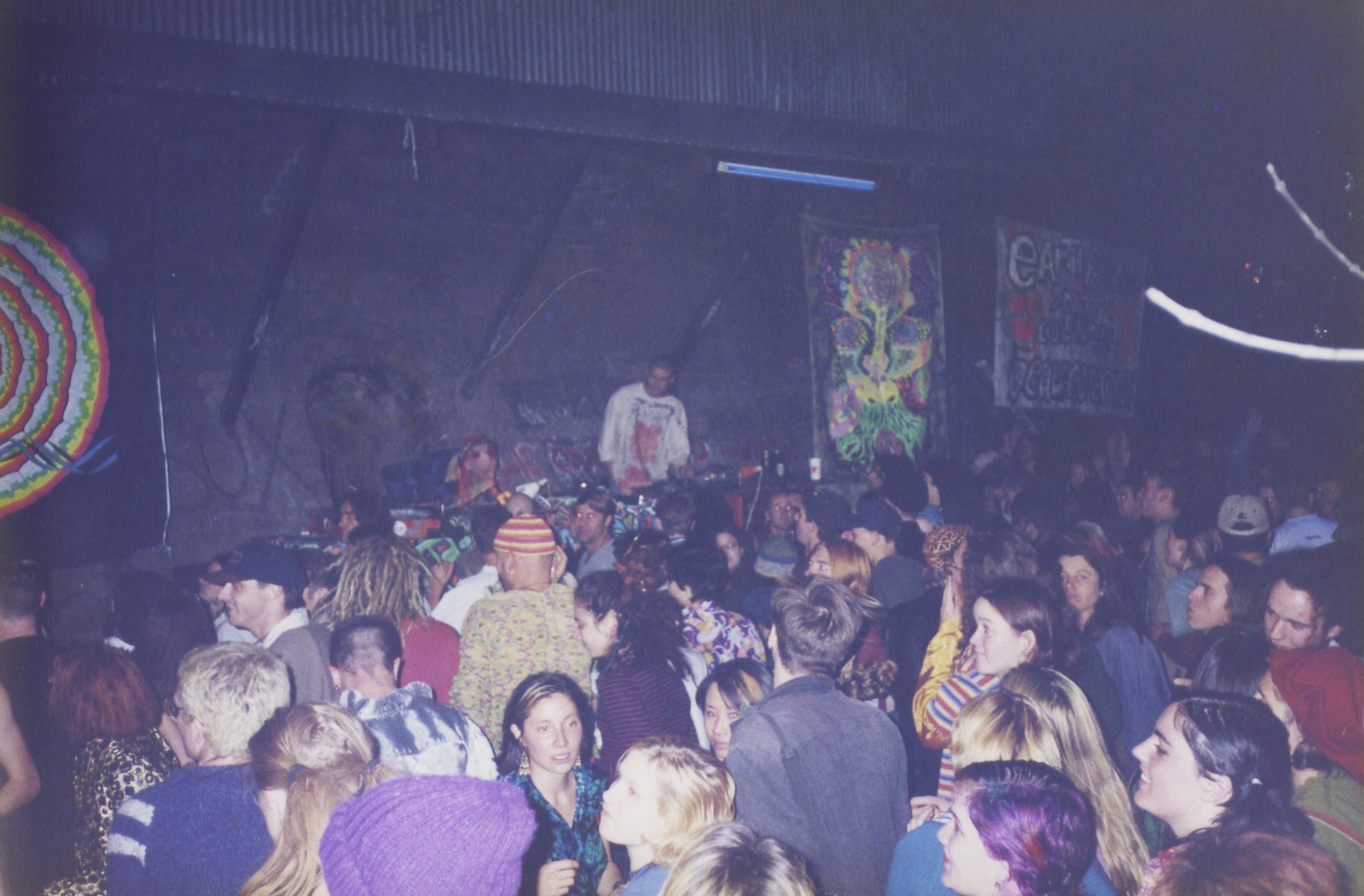
Crowd of rave-goers, 1995.

- Common unisex hairstyles included neon colored spiky hair, natural dreadlocks, undercut hairstyles, and synthetic hairpieces, and many ravers in the US and Europe wore tattoos and body piercings. Widespread accessories included wristbands and collars, whistles, pacifiers, feather boas, cyberpunk inspired goggles, glow sticks, and record bags made of truck tarpaulins.

=== Hip-hop ===
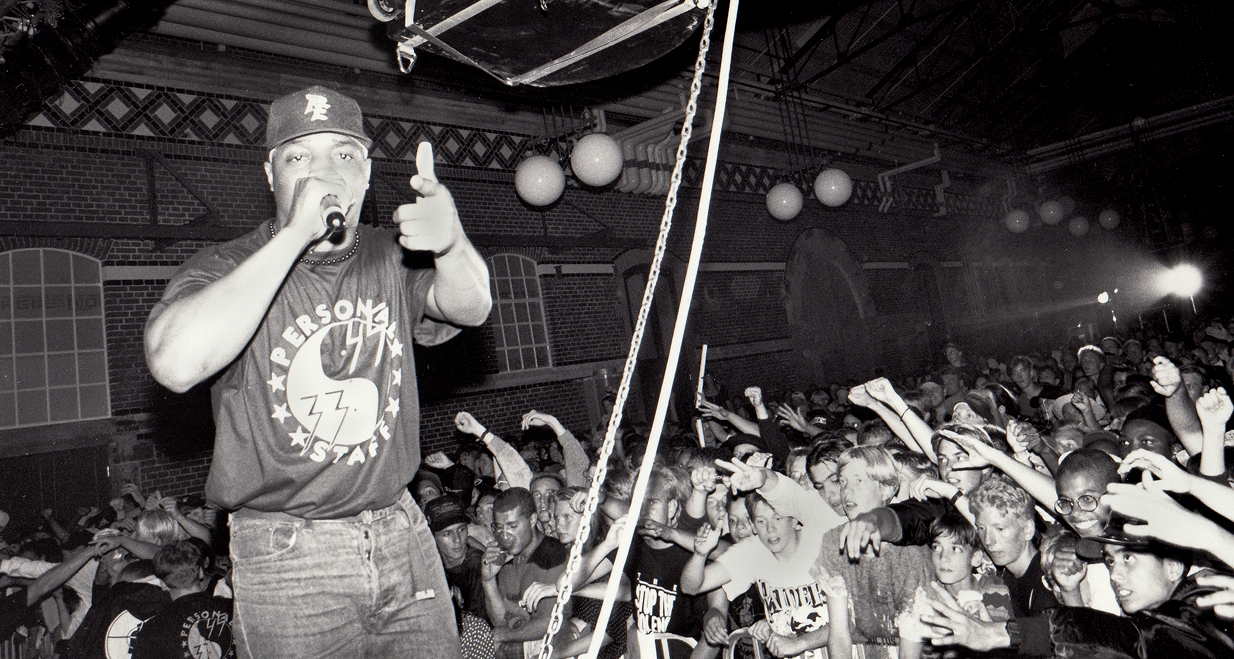
Swedish hip-hop fans watch Public Enemy perform in 1991.

- The early 1990s saw widespread interest in hip-hop and gangsta rap due to the influences of MC Hammer, Tupac Shakur, Eazy-E, Dr. Dre, N.W.A, Wu-Tang Clan, and Public Enemy. The sagging trend began in the early 1990s and continued until the 2010s. Wide leg jeans, Plaid, Khakis, Locs glasses, bomber jackets, tracksuits and baseball caps and snapback hats worn backwards became popular among hip-hop fans together with gold chains, sovereign rings, and FUBU T-shirts. By the end of the decade, hip-hop fashion had influenced many global subcultures, especially the British chavs with their tracksuits and white trainers, the sneakerheads of America and Asia, and the ICP fans known as Juggalos with their all-black outfits and evil clown corpse paint.

=== Britpop ===
- In the mid-1990s, indie rock, Madchester, and Britpop bands Blur, Stone Roses, and Oasis resulted in a revival of 1970s fashions, including Mod haircuts, aviator sunglasses, denim jackets, green parkas, harrington jackets, velvet sportcoats, striped shirts, Ben Sherman polo shirts, T-shirts bearing the RAF roundel, and Union Jack motifs including the dress worn by the Spice Girls' Geri Halliwell.

=== Goth ===
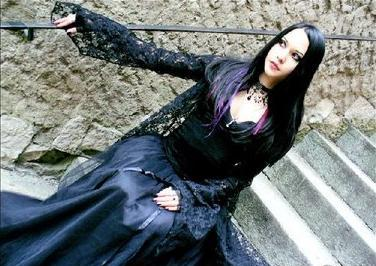
Example of late 1990s gothic fashion.

- During the mid- to late 1990s, gothic fashion peaked in popularity among American, German and British teenagers seeking to break from the mainstream. Black leather trenchcoats, frilly poet shirts, winklepickers, velvet blazers, long black hair, fetish clothing, and tight pants were a common sight on both sexes, and girls often wore Victorian inspired corsets, lace gloves, Demonia boots, and short leather skirts.

=== Preppy ===
- The conservative preppy look of the 1980s remained popular among wealthy teenagers in the Eastern US until the late 1990s, when many members of the subculture began adopting elements of hip-hop fashion. Typical clothing for preps of the 1990s included khaki chinos, and high waisted ankle length jeans and pants with straight legs or pleats. Navy blue blazers, Oxford shirts, brogues, Keds worn with everything especially leggings, with slouch socks, oversized sweatshirts, oversized sweaters or oversized tees, stirrup pants worn over tights or pantyhose with flats and an oversized top, sweaters and tees, boat shoes, ballet flats, coach jackets, baseball jackets, mom jeans, shortalls, jeans worn with a leotard or bodysuit as a top, shorts or skirts worn with blazers (for girls), ballet flats and a top and jacket, sweater over a turtleneck, and Champion crew neck sweatshirts worn over a turtleneck. A typical outfit included leggings with an oversized v-neck sweater over a turtleneck, slouch socks, and Keds, Sperrys boat shoes or Sperrys white sneakers. Also plaid or plain short dresses and skirts with pastel or white knee socks worn over the knee or folded at the top of the knee with ballet flats or boat shoes. And from around the mid 90s on slip dresses especially one worn above the knee with a capped sleeved tee or capped sleeved bodysuit underneath were popular with all ages. Also seen were long ankle length slip dresses. Neat, well-groomed hairstyles were popular among upper elementary, middle school, high school and college age girls, including bangs, straightened hime cut side bunches, or high regular ponytails worn with scrunchies and headbands many times in combination with bangs.

== Hairstyles ==
=== Women's hairstyles ===
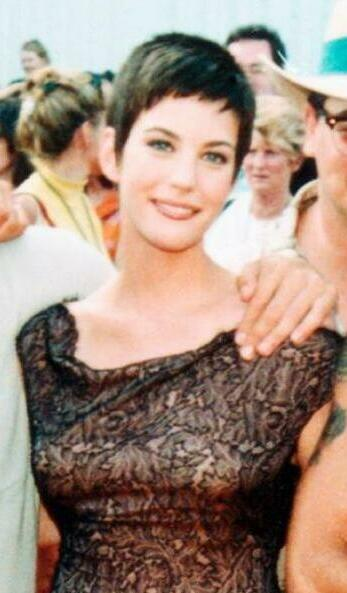
Actress Liv Tyler sporting a pixie cut, 1998

Women's hair in the early 1990s continued in the big, curly style of the 1980s. High and high sided ponytails continued through most of the decade, especially when playing sports and at the gym. These were worn with a scrunchie until the mid-1990s, when they were replaced by hair ties. Bangs remained big throughout the decade, especially the poofy "mall bangs" style associated with the early 1990s. From 1994 and through 2000s they got smaller and somewhat flatter and laid closer to the forehead.

The pixie cut and Rachel haircut, based on the hairstyles of Jennifer Aniston in Friends and Marlo Thomas in That Girl, were popular in America from 1995 onwards. Around the same time red hair also became a desirable color for women, as well as feathered bangs, and mini hair-buns. From 1995 until 2008, dark-haired women tended to dye their hair a lighter color with blonde highlights (popularized by Jennifer Aniston).

In the late 1990s, the Bob cut was popularized and rejuvenated by Victoria Beckham of the Spice Girls. This late 1990s style bob cut featured a center, side, or zig-zag part, as opposed to the thick bangs of the early 1990s. The Farrah Fawcett hairstyle made a comeback, with highlights going hand-in-hand with this revival. Other late 1990s haircuts included "Felicity curls" (popularized by Keri Russell in the hit TV show Felicity), the Fishtail Half-Up, and pigtails, as well as the continuation of mid-1990s hairdos.

=== Children's and teenager's hairstyles ===
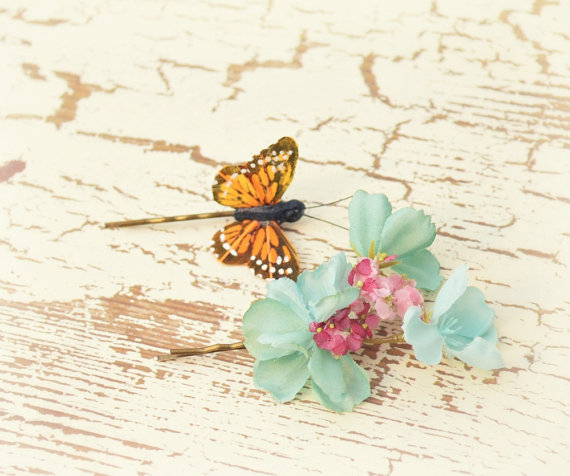
Butterfly and floral clips, worn in the mid- and late 1990s.

For teenage boys, longer hair was popular in the early to mid-1990s, including collar-length curtained hair, long and unkempt grunge hair, the blond surfer hair popular among some Britpop fans, and dreadlocks. During the mid-1990s, the much-ridiculed bowl cut became a fad among skaters, while hip-hop fans wore a variant of the flattop known as the hi-top fade. In the late 1990s, hair was usually buzzed very short for an athletic look, although a few grunge fans grew their hair long in reaction to this.

For teenage girls and younger children, hair was worn long with heavily teased bangs called "mall bangs" which were long fringes covering the forehead. From 1994 through the 2000s they got smaller, somewhat flatter, and laid closer to the forehead. Alice bands, headbands and scrunchies of various styles and colors (especially red, navy blue polka dot, plaid and neon) were popular with American girls throughout the early and mid-1990s, and they frequently wore them with twin pigtails, or high or high side ponytails and bangs. Beginning in the late 1990s and continuing into the 2010s, straightened hair and variants of the French braid became popular in Europe.

=== Men's hairstyles ===
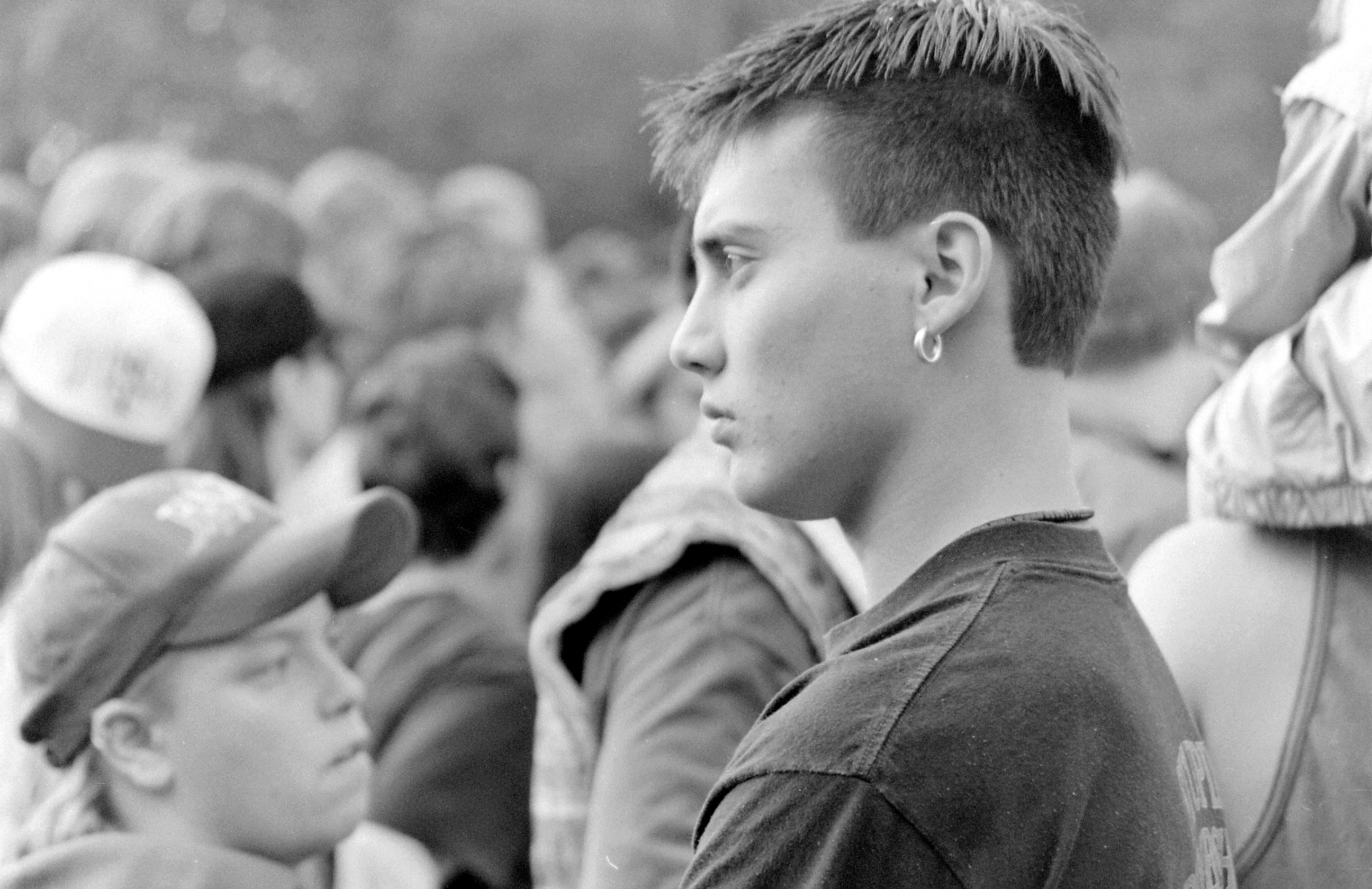
Young man in 1995, sporting a short undercut hairstyle.

The 1990s generally saw the continued popularity of longer hair on men, especially in the United States, Scandinavia and Canada. In the early 1990s, curtained hair, mullets, and ponytails were popular. Other trends included flattops, hi-top fades, and cornrows.

In the mid-1990s, men's hairstyle trends went in several different directions. Younger men who were more amenable had adopted the Caesar cut, either natural or dyed. This style was popularized by George Clooney on the hit TV show ER in season two, which premiered in mid-1995. More rebellious young men went for longer, unkempt "grunge" hair, often with a center part. The curtained hairstyle was at its peak in popularity, and sideburns went out of style. Meanwhile, most professional men over 30 had conservative 1950s style bouffant haircuts, regular haircuts, or the Caesar cut.

In the late 1990s, it was considered unstylish and unattractive for men and boys to have longer hair. As a result, short hair completely took over. From 1997 onwards, aside from curtained hair (which was popular throughout the decade), spiky hair, bleached hair, crew cuts, and variants of the quiff became popular among younger men. Dark haired men dyed their spikes blonde or added wavy blonde streaks, a trend which continued into the 2000s. Variants of the surfer hair were popular among rock musicians during that time period. For African-American men, the cornrows (popularized by former NBA player Allen Iverson) and buzz cut were a popular trend that continued into the 2000s.

== Makeup and cosmetic trends ==
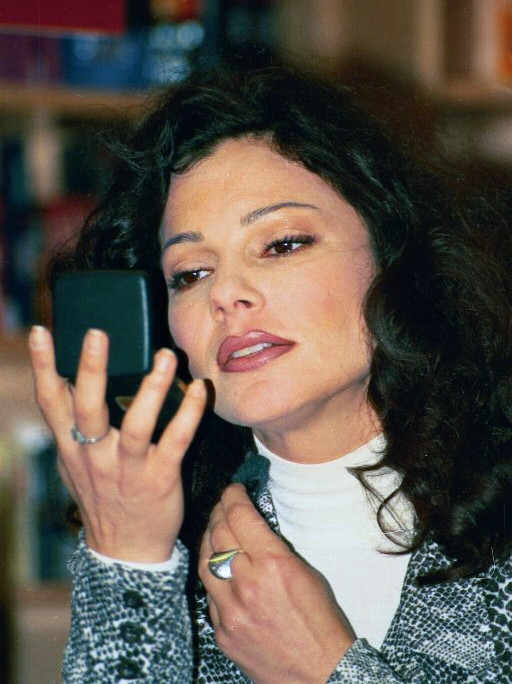
Nude and darker shades of lipstick seemed popular throughout the decade. (Fran Drescher, 1996)

Women's makeup in the early 1990s primarily consisted of dark red lipstick and neutral eyes. Around 1992 the "grunge look" came into style among younger women and the look was based on dark red lipstick and smudged eyeliner and eyeshadow. Both styles of makeup continued into 1994, but went out of style the next year.

The trends in makeup shifted in the mid-1990s. In 1995, nude shades became desirable and women had a broader color palette in brown. Another makeup trend that emerged was matte lipsticks, with deep shades of red and dark wine colors worn as part of night makeup. Blue-frosted eye shadow became fashionable, and was eventually integrated into the Y2K makeup of the late 1990s/early 2000s (decade). Gothic makeup had broken into the mainstream, having been made up of vamp lipstick (or even black lipstick), heavy mascara and eyeliner, often purple-tinted eye shadow (or else very dark blue), and extremely pale foundation. The Gothic makeup remained relevant in the later years of the decade.

By 1999, glittery, sparkling makeup had come into style. This was called "Y2K makeup", consisting of facial glitter and lip gloss. Blue-frosted eye shadow remained a staple of late 1990s makeup, although silver was ideal look. Dark eyeliner was considered bodacious. Pale, shiny lips became desirable, as lip gloss largely replaced lipstick. An alternative for those who did not like metallics were purples and browns. Goth makeup and Y2K makeup continued into the early 2000s.

== Gallery ==
A selection of images related to the period.

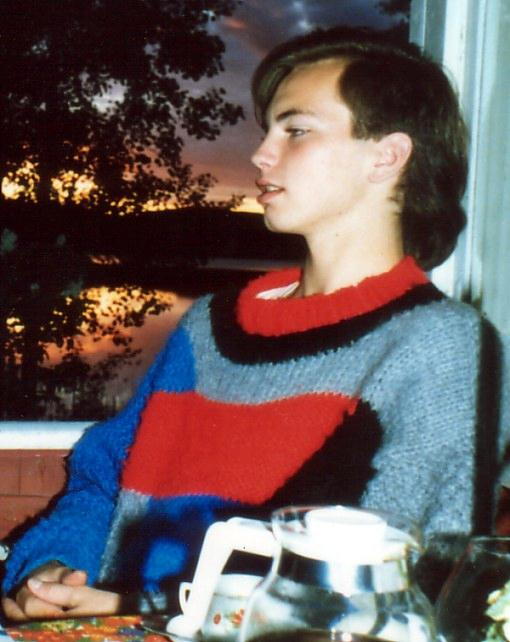
Swedish teenager with mullet haircut and abstract jumper, 1991.

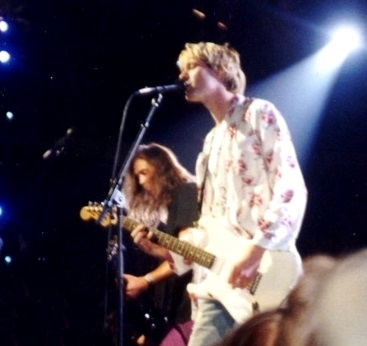
Kurt Cobain, 1992. He wears grunge clothing, popular from 1991 to 1996.

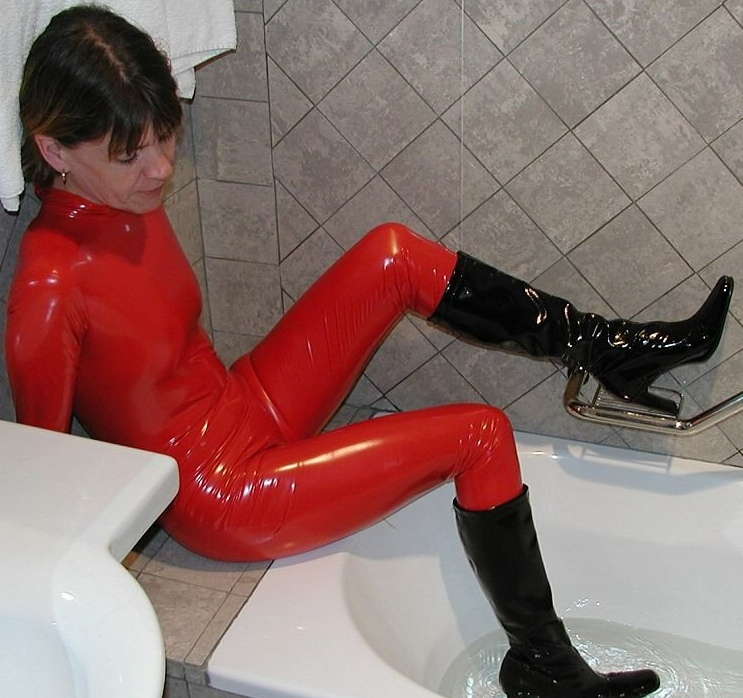
The catsuit became a trend in the late 1990s. Normally made of latex, PVC, or spandex, it was often worn with high-heeled boots.

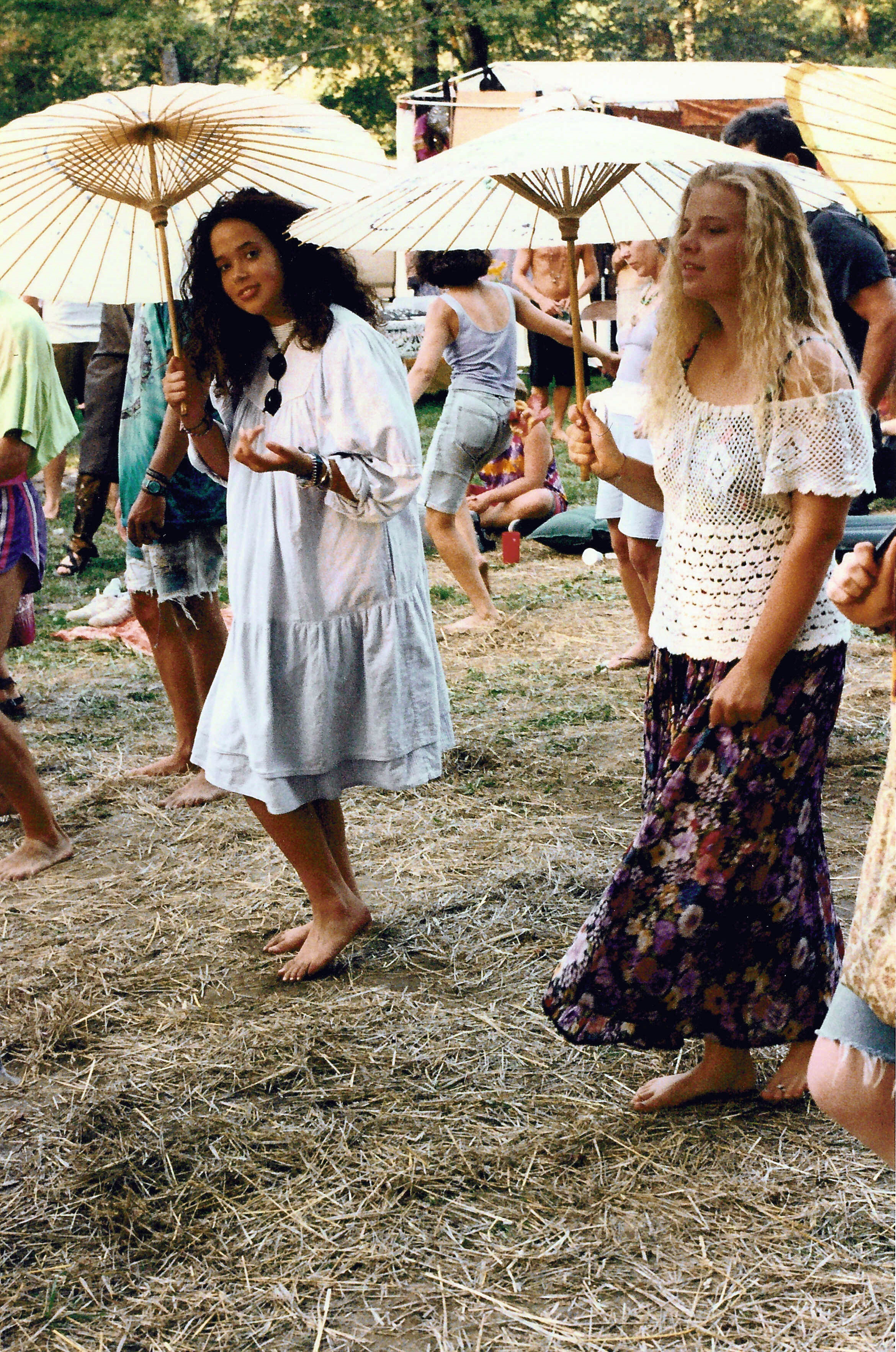
Dancers at the 1992 Snoqualmie Moondance Festival in Snoqualmie, Washington.

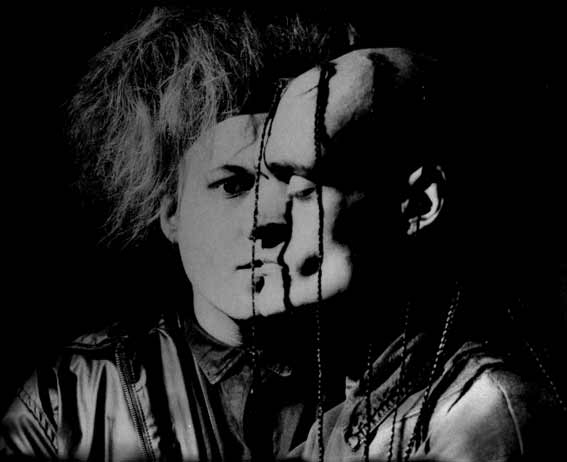
The German electronic rock duo Das Ich, 1993. Their aspect shows the influence of the goth look which returned in the 1990s.

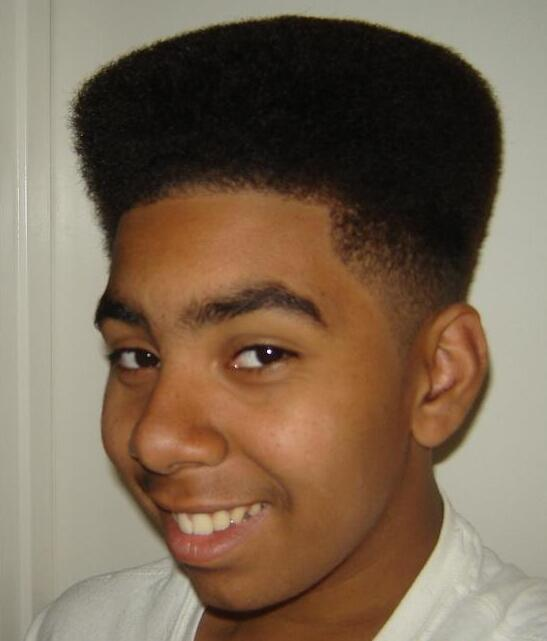
African-American teenager with Hitop fade, popular in the early 1990s.

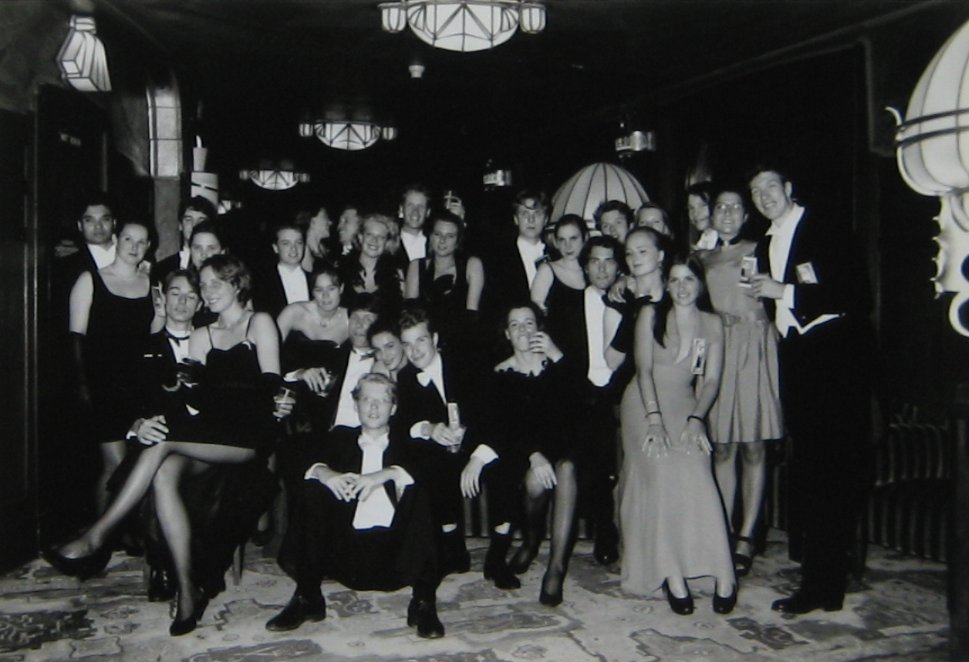
Dutch high school prom, 1994.

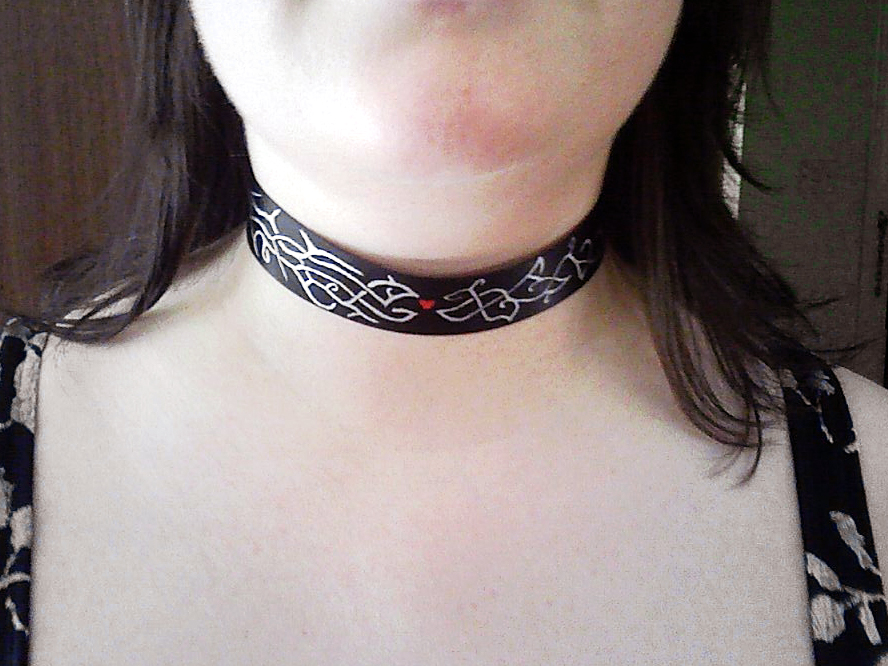
Chokers, popular in the mid- and late-1990s.

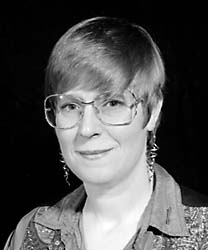
Lois McMaster Bujold with pixie cut and denim western shirt, 1996.

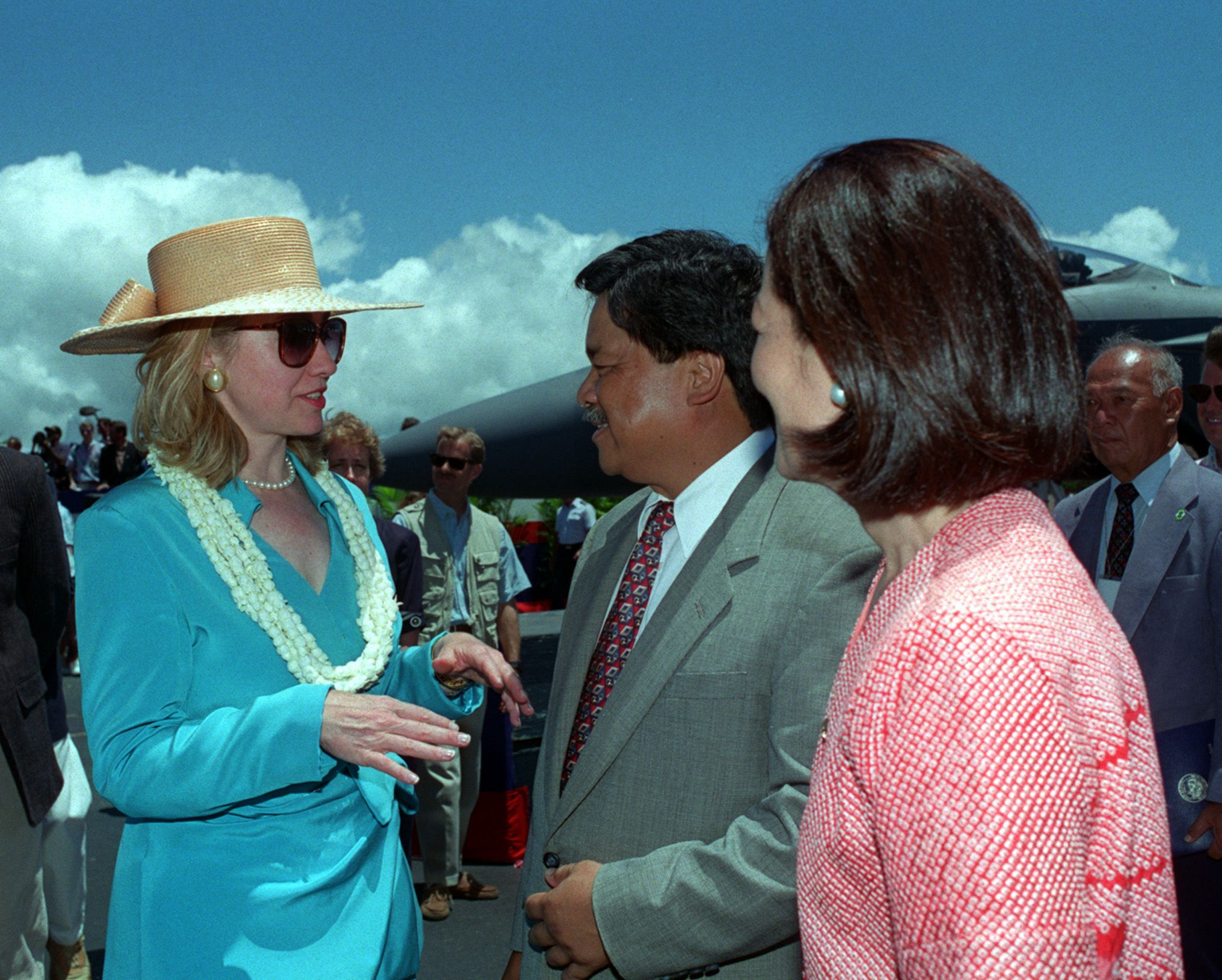
US First Lady Hillary Clinton wearing a straw hat, 1995.

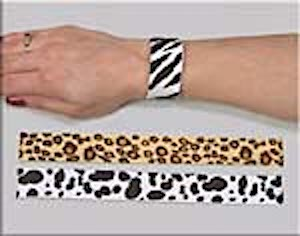
Slap bracelet worn by young girls in the early 1990s.

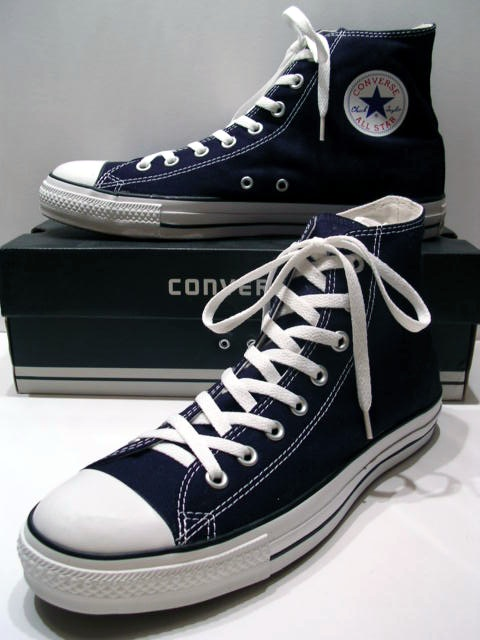
Converse All Stars, popular in the early 1990s.

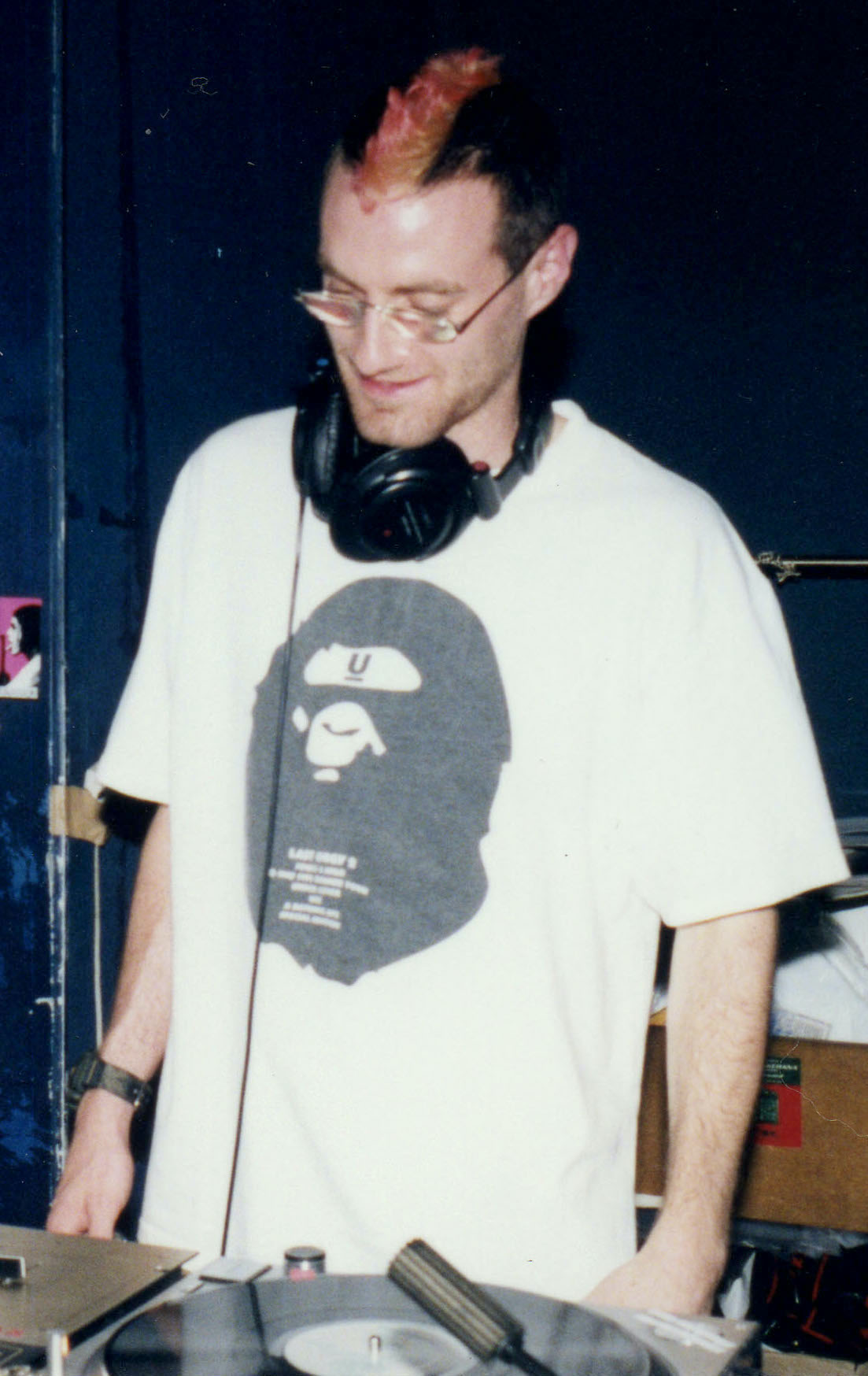
Electronic musician and DJ James Lavelle dressed in club attire, 1997.

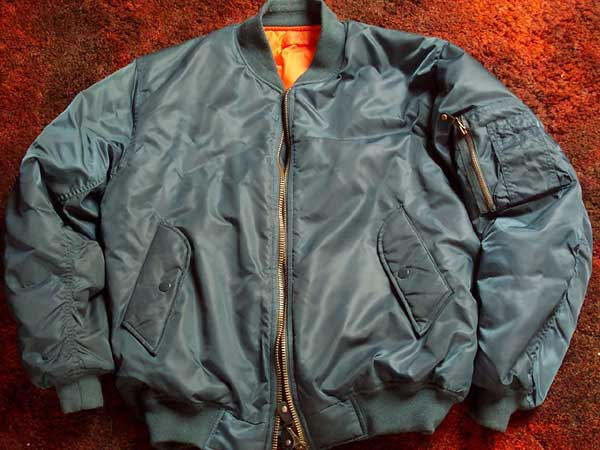
Bomber jacket with orange lining, popular from the mid- to late-1990s.

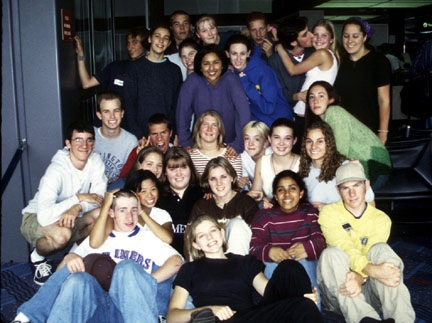
Group of high school students, 1997.

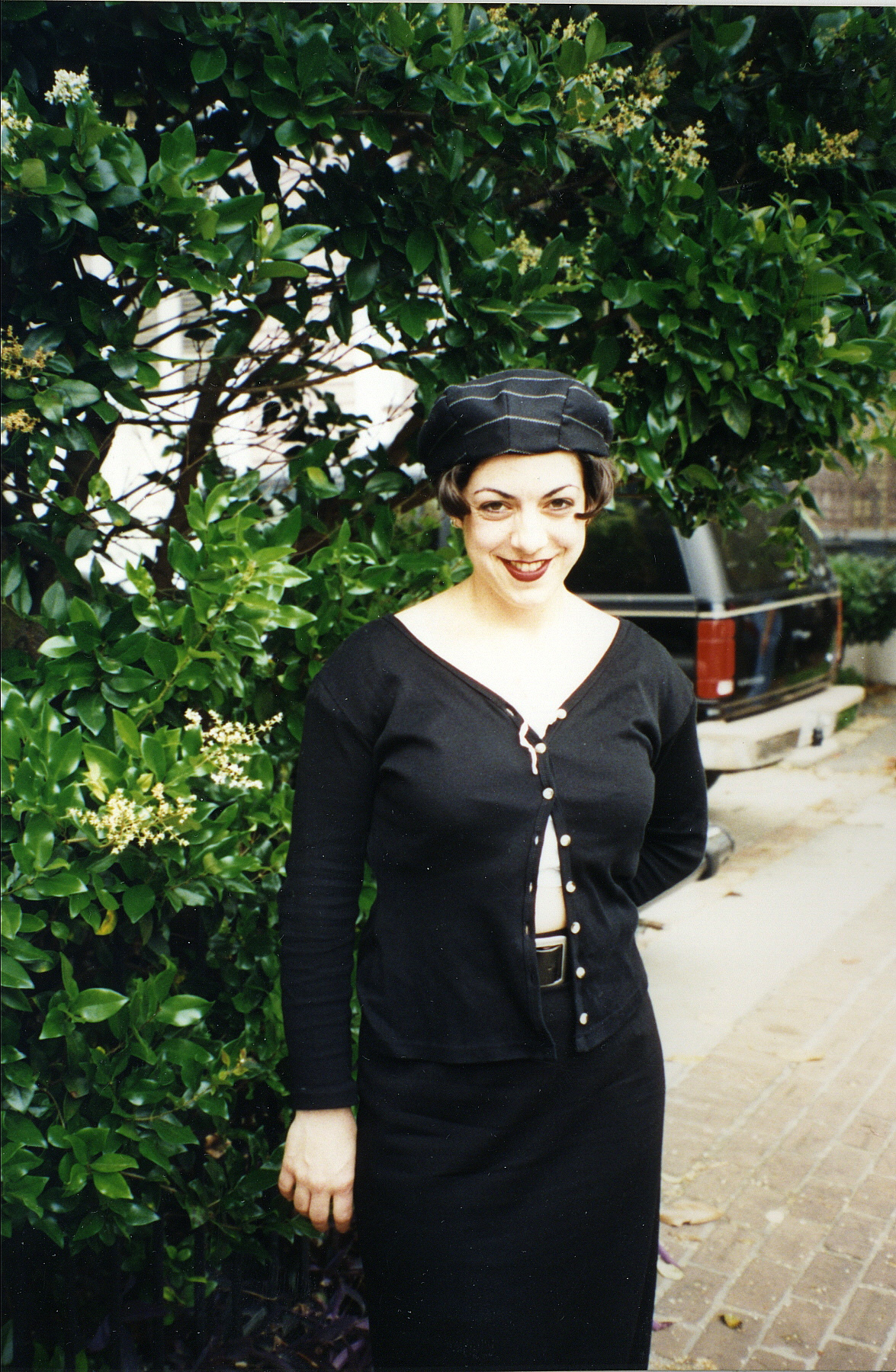
Woman dressed in black maxi skirt, top and hat, 1995.

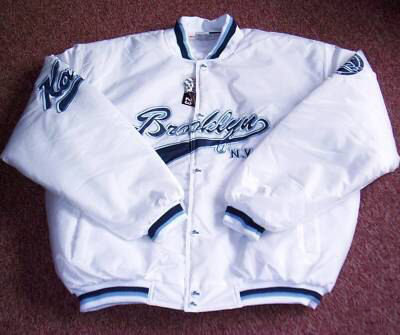
Baseball jackets were popular among hip-hop fans in the mid-1990s.

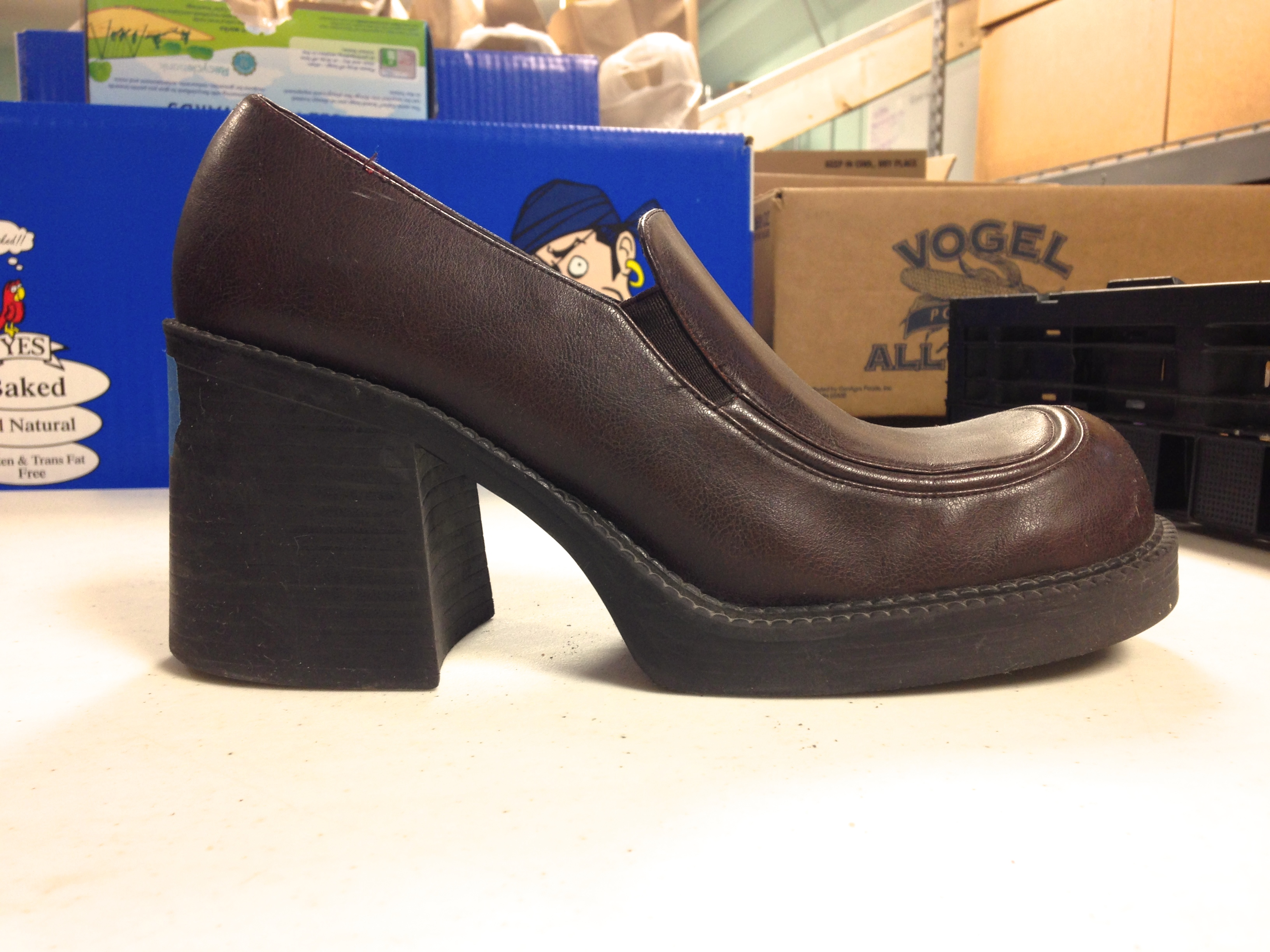
Women's side gusset shoes were popular among preppy and hip-hop subcultures in the mid- to late-1990s.

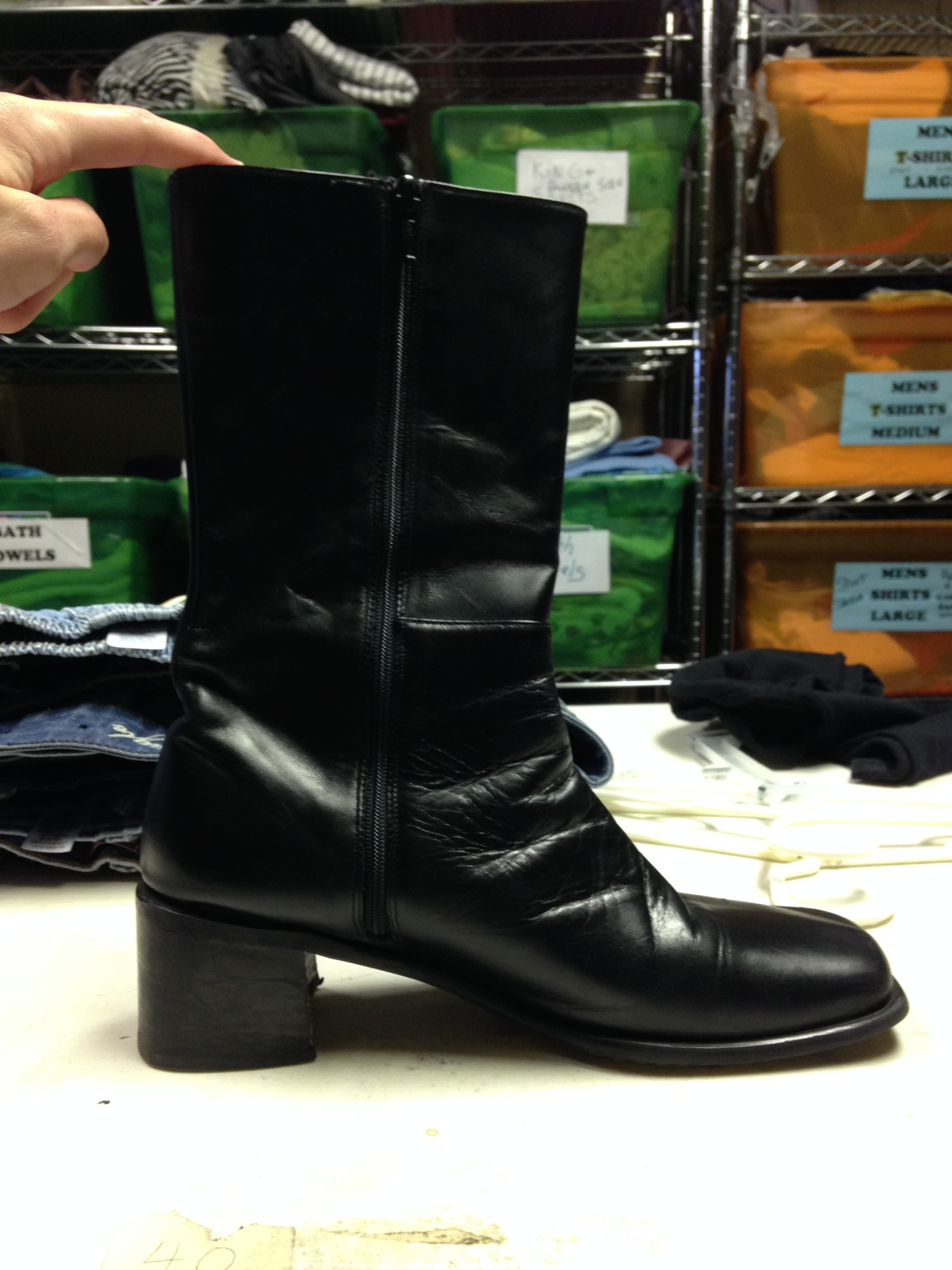
Go-go boots became fashionable again in 1995. They were worn by women of the hip-hop, alternative, and dance subcultures.

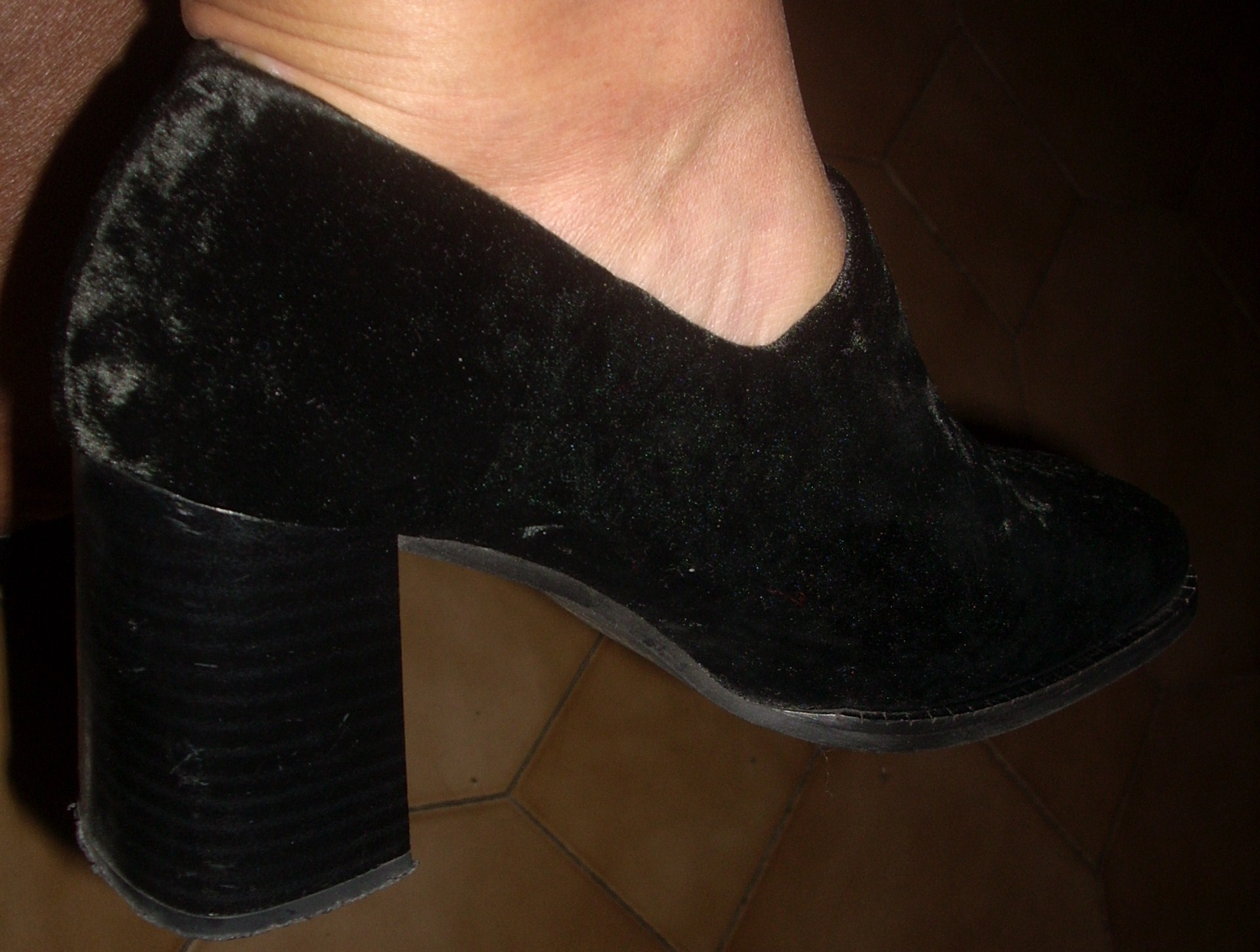
Block-heeled shoes, popular from 1995 to 2001.

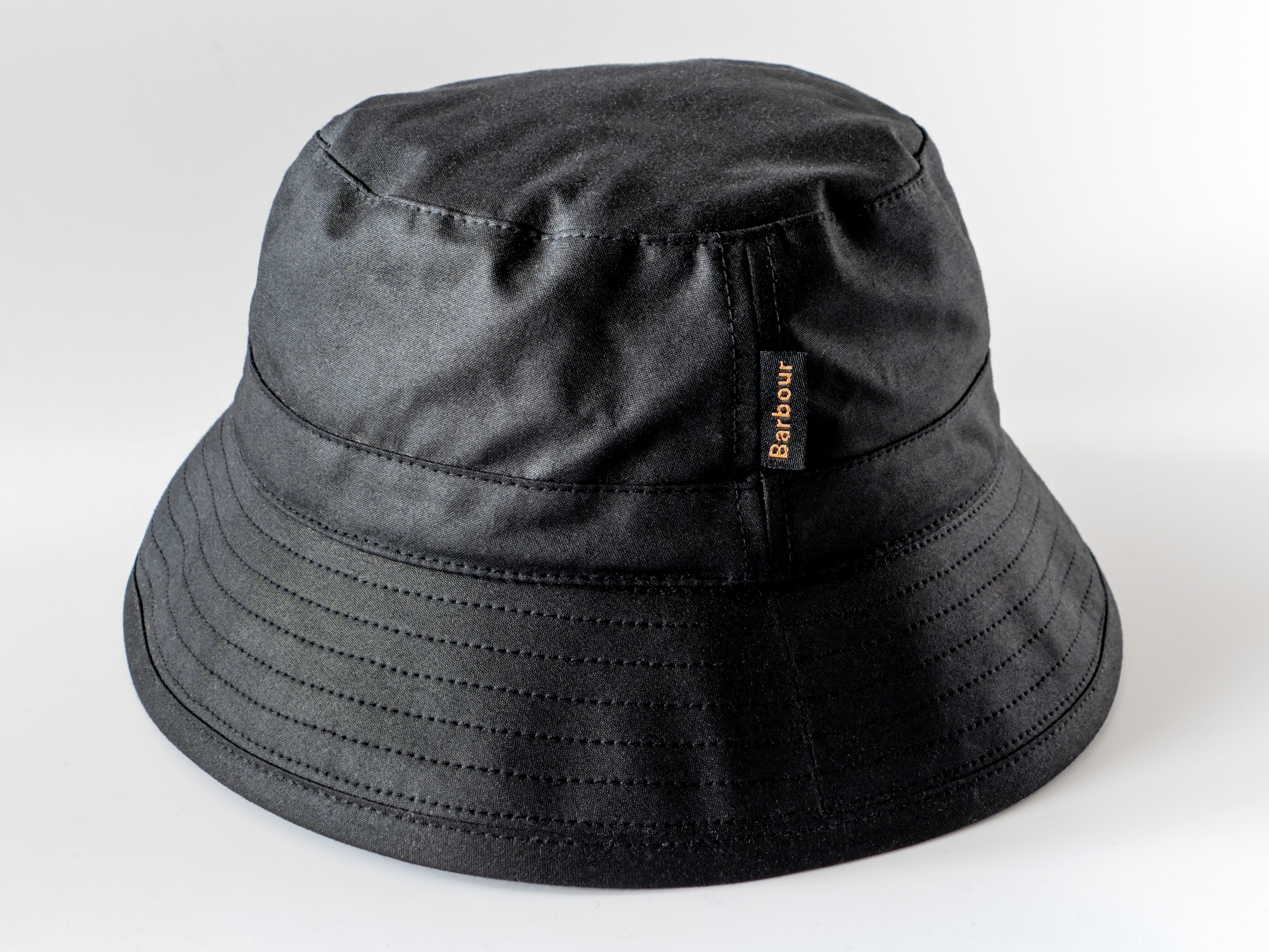
Black Barbour bucket hat.

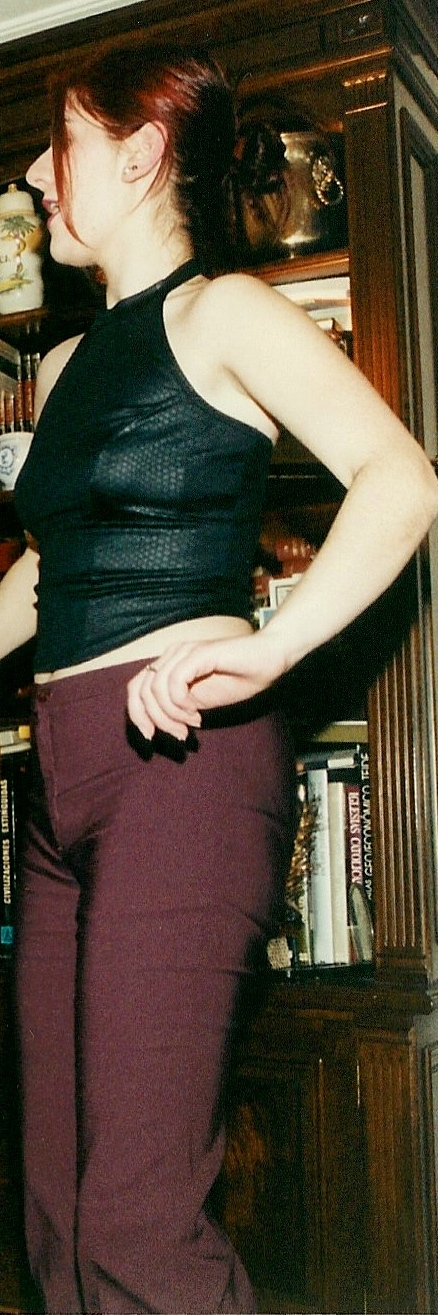
Woman wearing a crop top and bell-bottoms, 1997.

Woman with what would come be known as the Rachel haircut, early 1990s.

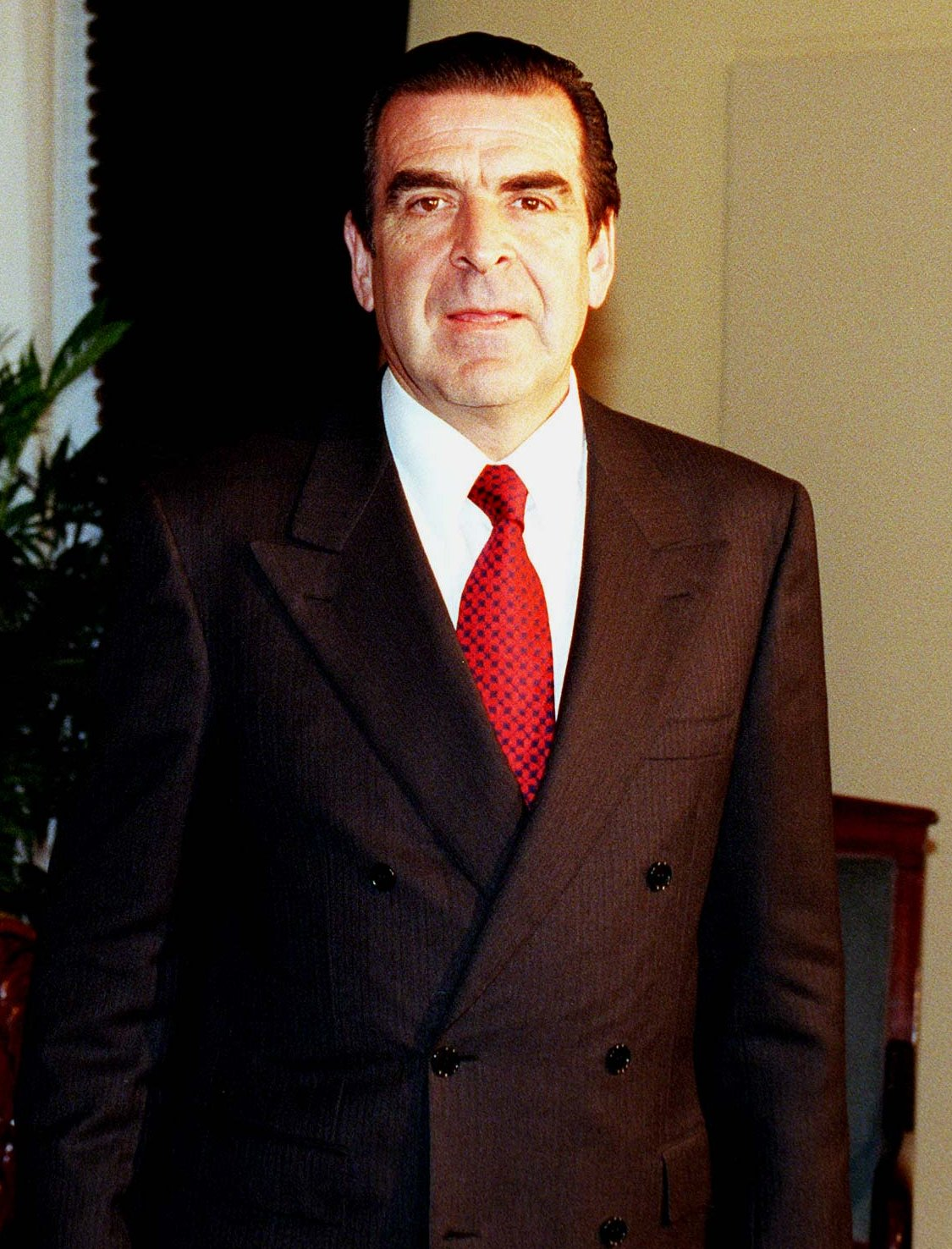
A man wearing a power suit, popular in the European workplace. The suit jacket is double-breasted with large shoulder pads. Photograph taken in 1998.

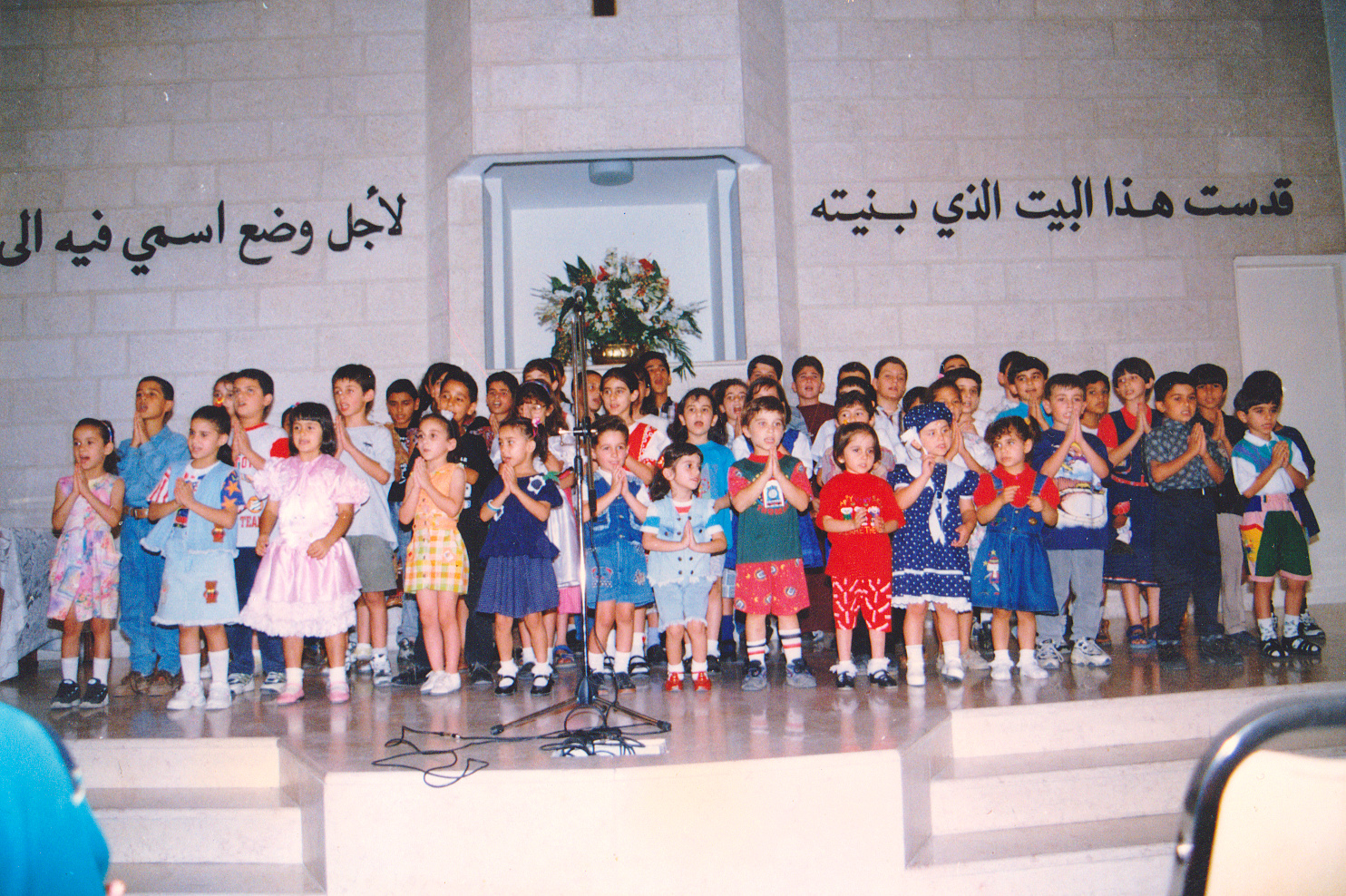
Group of young children displaying various fashion trends. Amman, 1998.

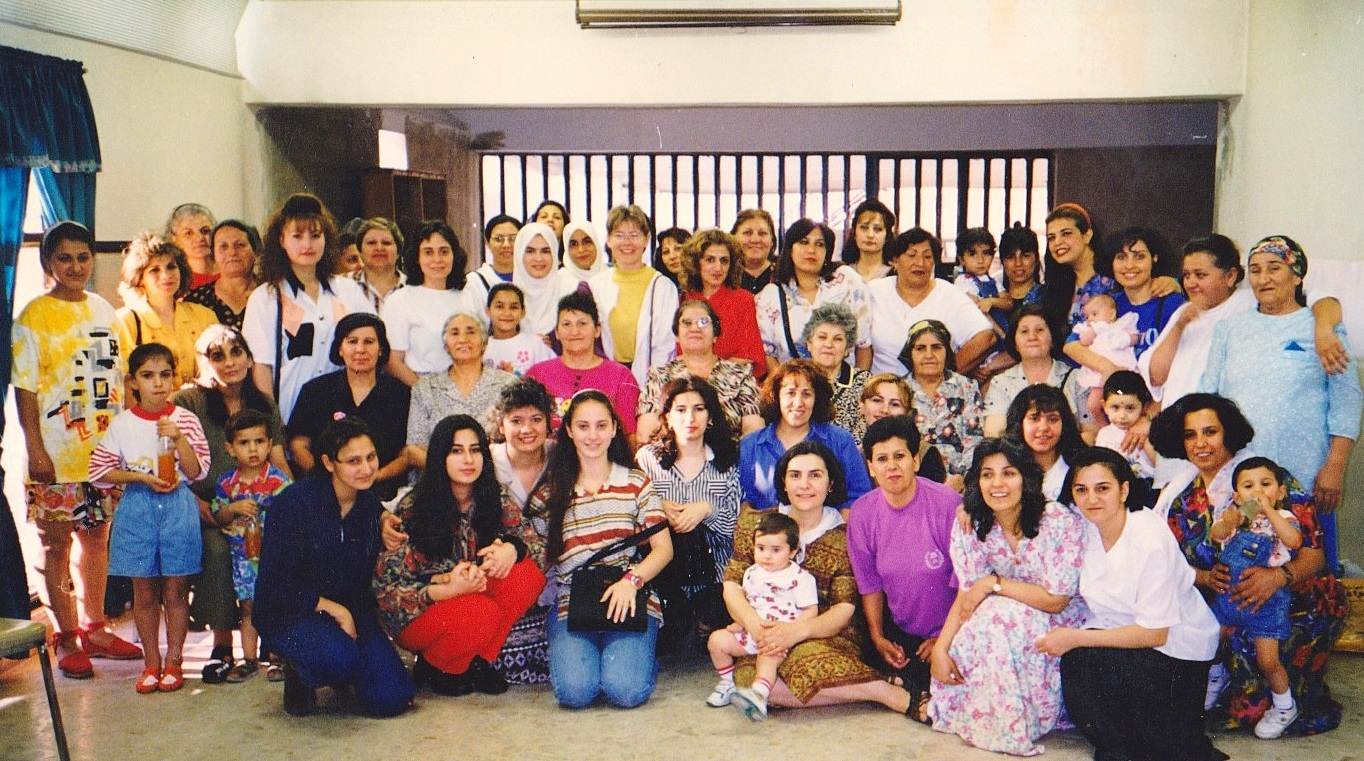
Church members exhibiting assorted fashion trends. Amman, 1998.

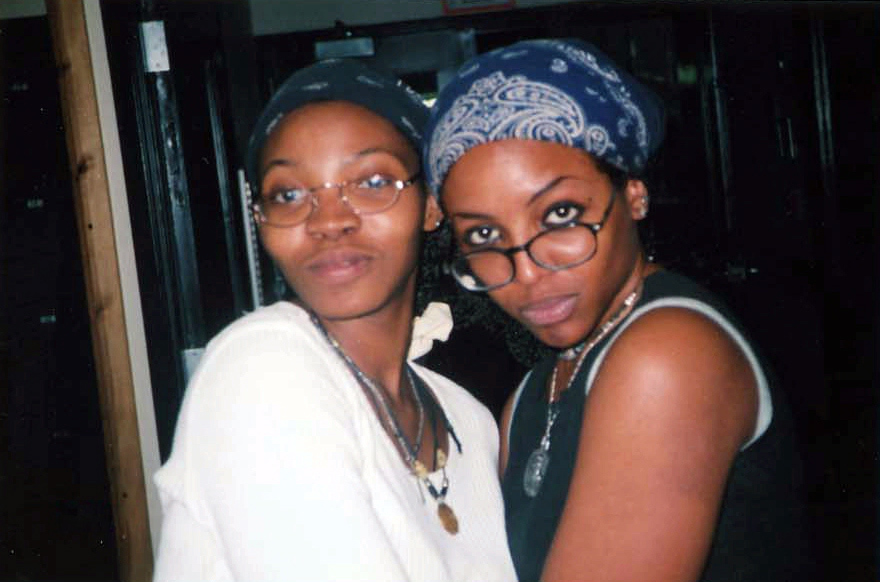
Two women wearing bandanas, 1999.

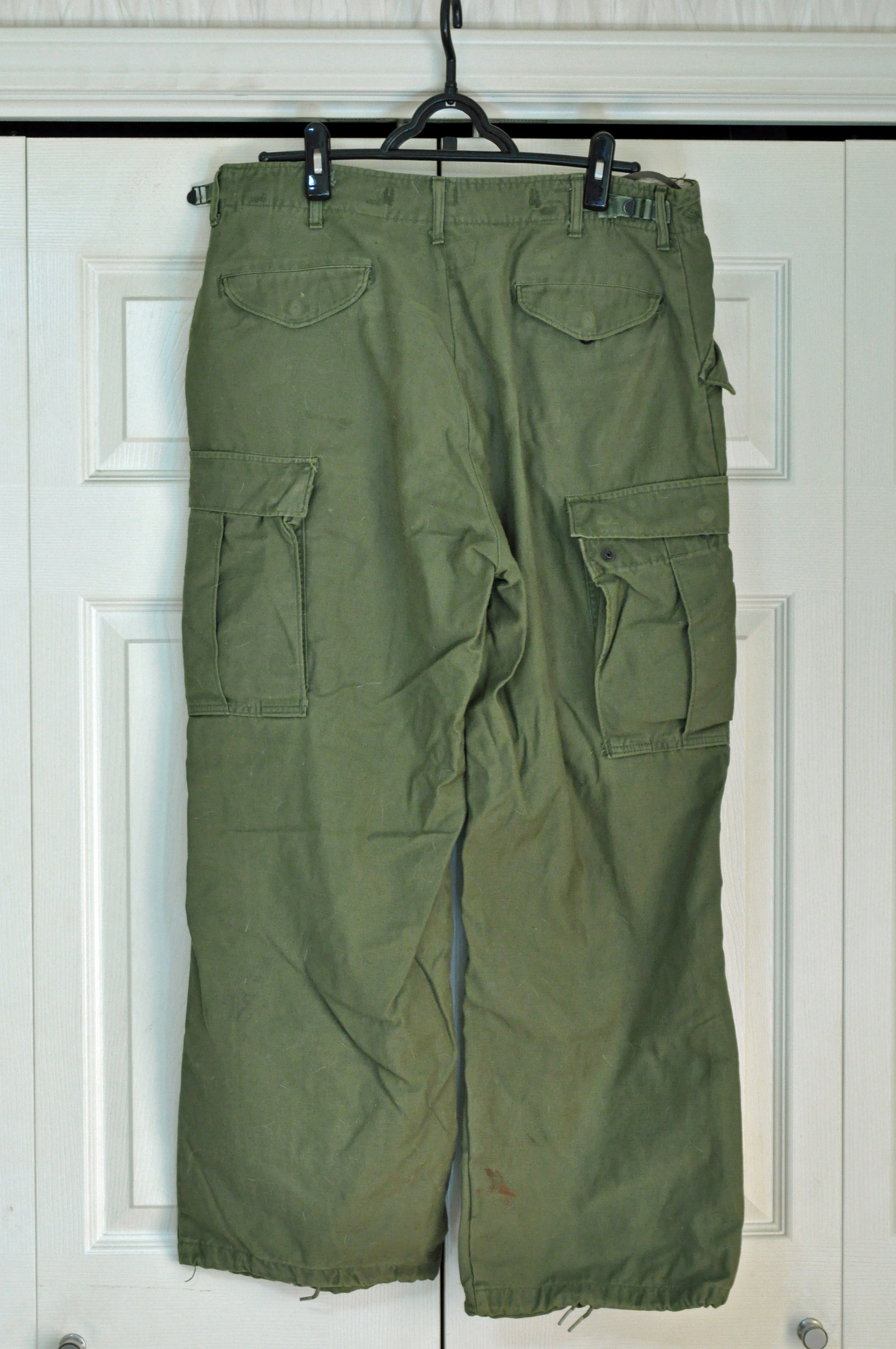
Cargo pants.

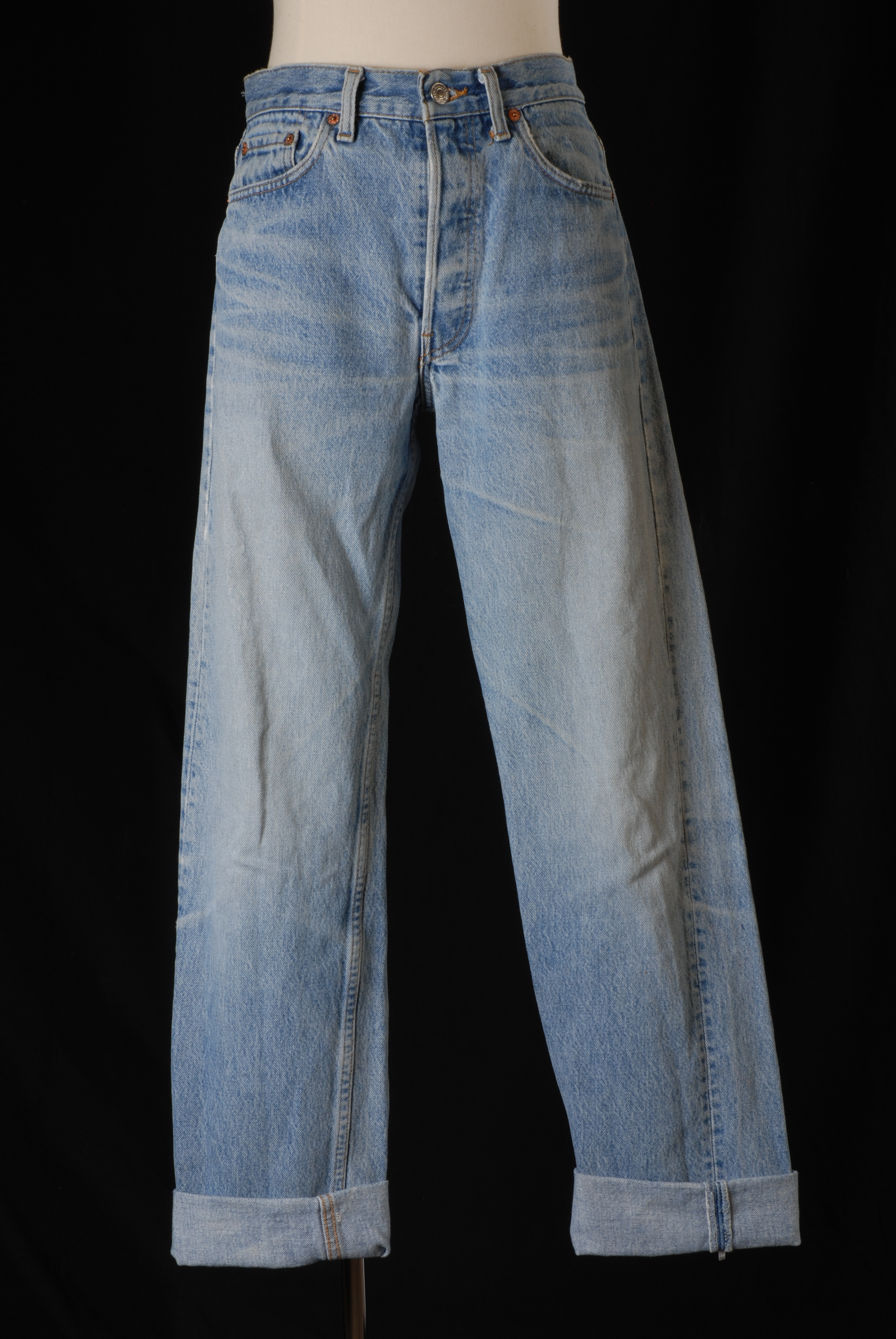
Blue wide-leg jeans.

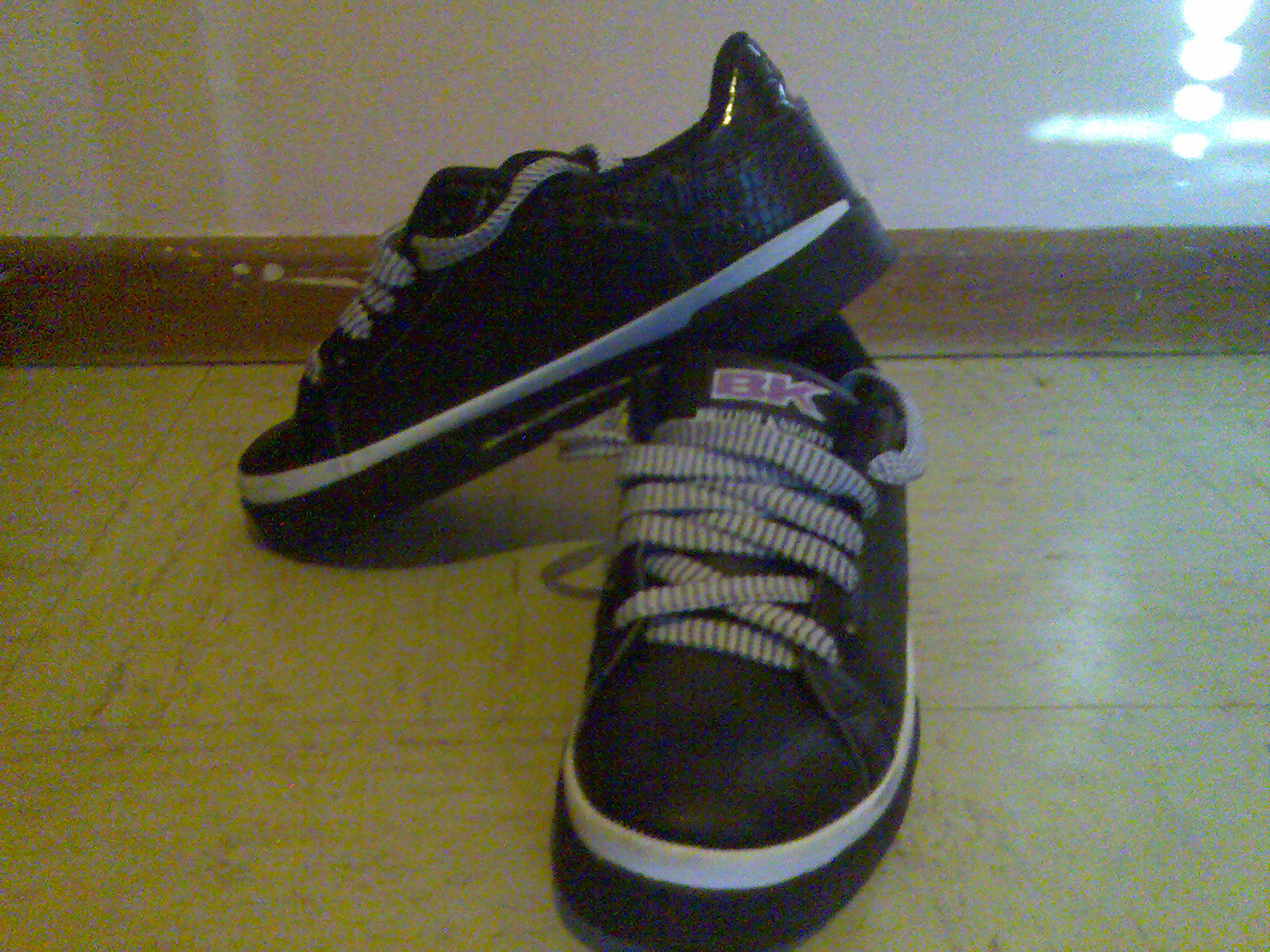
A pair of British Knights.

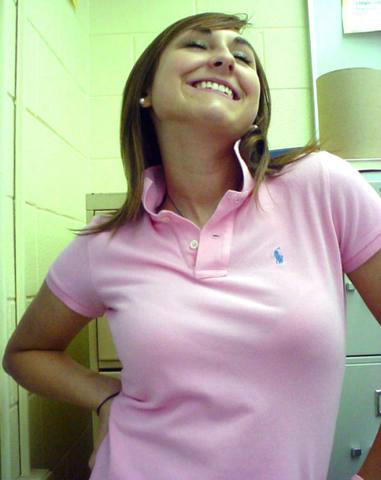
Woman wearing a polo shirt with a popped collar.

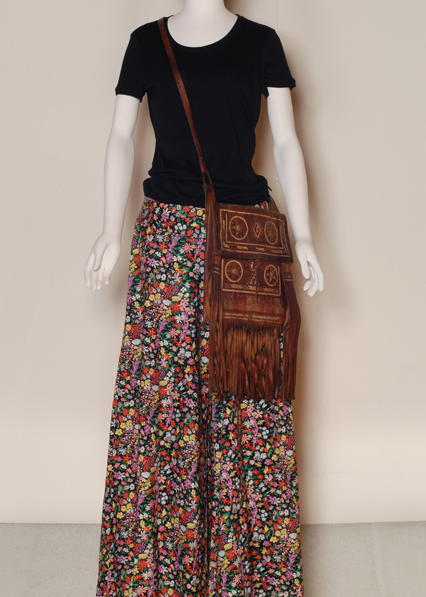
Long maxi skirt in a Liberty floral print.

== See also ==
- Deconstruction (fashion)
- 1970s in fashion
- 1980s in fashion
- 2000s in fashion
