= Stirrup pants =

Close-fitting tapered pants with bands for the feet

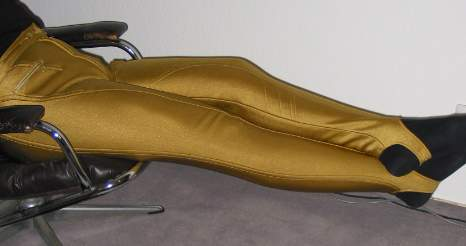
Stirrup pants designed as sportswear

Stirrup pants or stirrup leggings are a type of close-fitting pants that taper at the ankle, similar to leggings, except that the material extends to a band, or strap, that is worn under the arch of the foot to hold the pant leg in place. The band of material is often elasticized to prevent the material around the foot from tearing. Stirrup pants were originally sportswear for women, and remain sportswear for horse riding and skiing. However, they have come in and out of fashion during the 20th and early 21st centuries, peaking in popularity as street fashion during the 1980s to the mid-1990s.

== History ==
Stirrup pants were first worn as jodhpurs for horse riders. The purpose of the strap under the foot was to hold the pant legs in place in the boots of the rider. As ladies moved away from riding sidesaddle, they began wearing riding breeches in the 1920s in a similar style to those worn by men. By 1934, jodhpurs as riding pants with foot straps were being advertised in the United States mail order catalogue for Sears. Horse riding breeches are still made with an elastic foot strap in some designs. Stirrup pants for skiing were introduced at the 1936 Winter Olympic Games in Germany.

Stirrup stretch pants were a mainstay of ski wear for both men and women during most of the 1960s and part of the 1970s. In the 1960s this style was used for women's and girls' stirrup pants. They were popular for several years as shown in clothing catalogs of the day, such as J.C.Penney, Sears, and Montgomery Ward.

Stirrup pants became a popular casual fashion for women of all ages in Europe and America from the mid-1980s to the mid-to-late 1990s. In 1985, Linda Pender wrote in Cincinnati Magazine that stirrup pants were "being touted as the wardrobe basic of the year, and everybody is buying them". On the one hand, the style was promoted as being "easy to wear" and giving "most figures a long, lean line"; on the other hand, a salesclerk pointed out to Pender that the style was not flattering unless the wearer was "slim and fit". They would be worn with an oversized shirt, sweatshirt or sweater and slouch socks worn over them with casual sneakers such as Keds, athletic sneakers or boat shoes. And it was just as popular to wear the stirrup pants with pantyhose or tights under the stirrup pants with the oversized tops and ballet flats making the pantyhose or tights visible at the foot up to the a little above the ankle area. This was worn as workwear and non workwear alike. For a time there was even denim stirrup pants and dress pants with stirrups. Leggings in general became fashionable streetwear during the 1980s, as did sweatshirts especially oversized style, leg warmers, slouch socks, leotards, body suits and other items that originated in sports and dance studios.

== See also ==
- Sportswear (activewear)
- Breeches
- Jodhpurs
- Trouser clips
- Capri pants
