= Burusera =

Clothing paraphilia

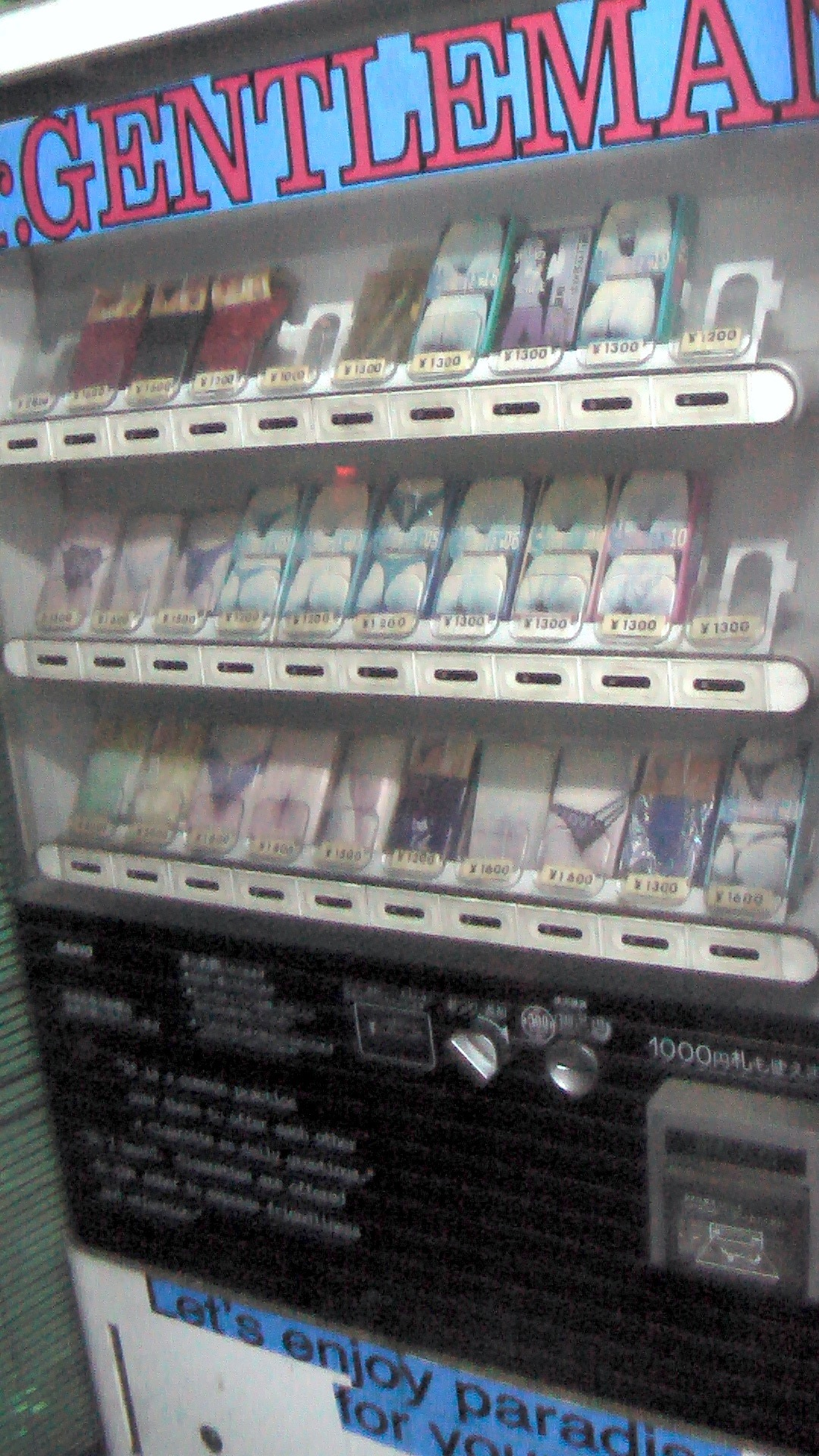
A Japanese vending machine selling used panties for fetish purposes

Burusera (ブルセラ) is a sexual fetishism, specifically a sexualized attraction to the underwear or school uniforms of girls or young women. It is a word of Japanese origin, coined by combining burumā (ブルマー), meaning bloomers, as in the bottoms of gym suits, and sērā-fuku (セーラー服), meaning sailor suit, the traditional Japanese school uniforms for schoolgirls; notably kogal. Burusera shops sell girls' used school uniforms, panties and other fetish items.

== History ==
In the 1990s, gravure magazines started to feature photos of girls wearing bloomers and school uniforms, some magazines featuring exclusively those types of clothes. Fetish shops selling these types of clothes also started appearing in Japan. Along with loose socks they became the symbol of high-school girls in the 1990s. They are also sometimes worn as cosplay.

== Burusera shops ==
Burusera shops sell used girl's gym suits and school uniforms. They also sell other goods procured from schoolgirls, e.g. undergarments, school swimsuits for physical education, socks, stationery, sanitary napkins and tampons. The clothes are often accompanied by ostensibly genuine photos of the girls wearing them. The clients are men who use the items for sexual arousal or stimulation. Schoolgirls once openly participated in the sale of their used garments, either through burusera shops or using mobile phone sites to sell directly to clients.

== Legal restrictions ==
In August 1994, a burusera shop manager who made a schoolgirl who was under 18 at the time sell her used underwear was arrested by the Tokyo Metropolitan Police Department on suspicion of violation of article 34 of the Child Welfare Act and article 175 of the Criminal Code. The police alleged violations of the Secondhand Articles Dealer Act which bans the purchase of secondhand goods without authorization.

Child pornography laws imposed legal control over the child pornography industry in 1999. However, burusera goods in themselves are not child pornography, and selling burusera goods is a legal way for schoolgirls under the age of 18 to gain extra income. This has been viewed with suspicion as potential child sexual abuse. Prefectures in Japan began enforcing regulations in 2004 that restricted purchases and sales of used underwear and saliva of people under 18.

== References in media ==
- In the Shin Kimagure Orange Road novel Summer's Beginning, main character Kyosuke Kasuga is disgusted when he finds out that his now highschool-aged younger sister Kurumi intends to sell her used leotards to a burusera shop.
- In the visual novel True Love, a key part to Mayumi Kamijou's route involves the player-character Daisuke, finding out that she intends to sell a pair of her panties in the local burusera shop. If Daisuke finds said panties, keeps them and gives them back to Mayumi when she asks for them, he will gain relationship points with her.
- In the video game Yakuza 0, a side quest involves the discovery, and ultimately the taking down, of a burusera ring.
- One of the characters in the novel Consumed, by the Canadian film director David Cronenberg, references it while talking about school uniforms.

== See also ==
- AV idol
- Clothing fetish
- Cosplay restaurant
- Gyaru
- Hentai
- Host and hostess clubs
- JK business
- Kogal
- Maid café
- Panchira
- Panty fetishism
- Shoe fetishism
- Uniform fetishism
- Upskirt
- Zettai ryōiki
