= Panchira =

Japanese word referring to upskirt images

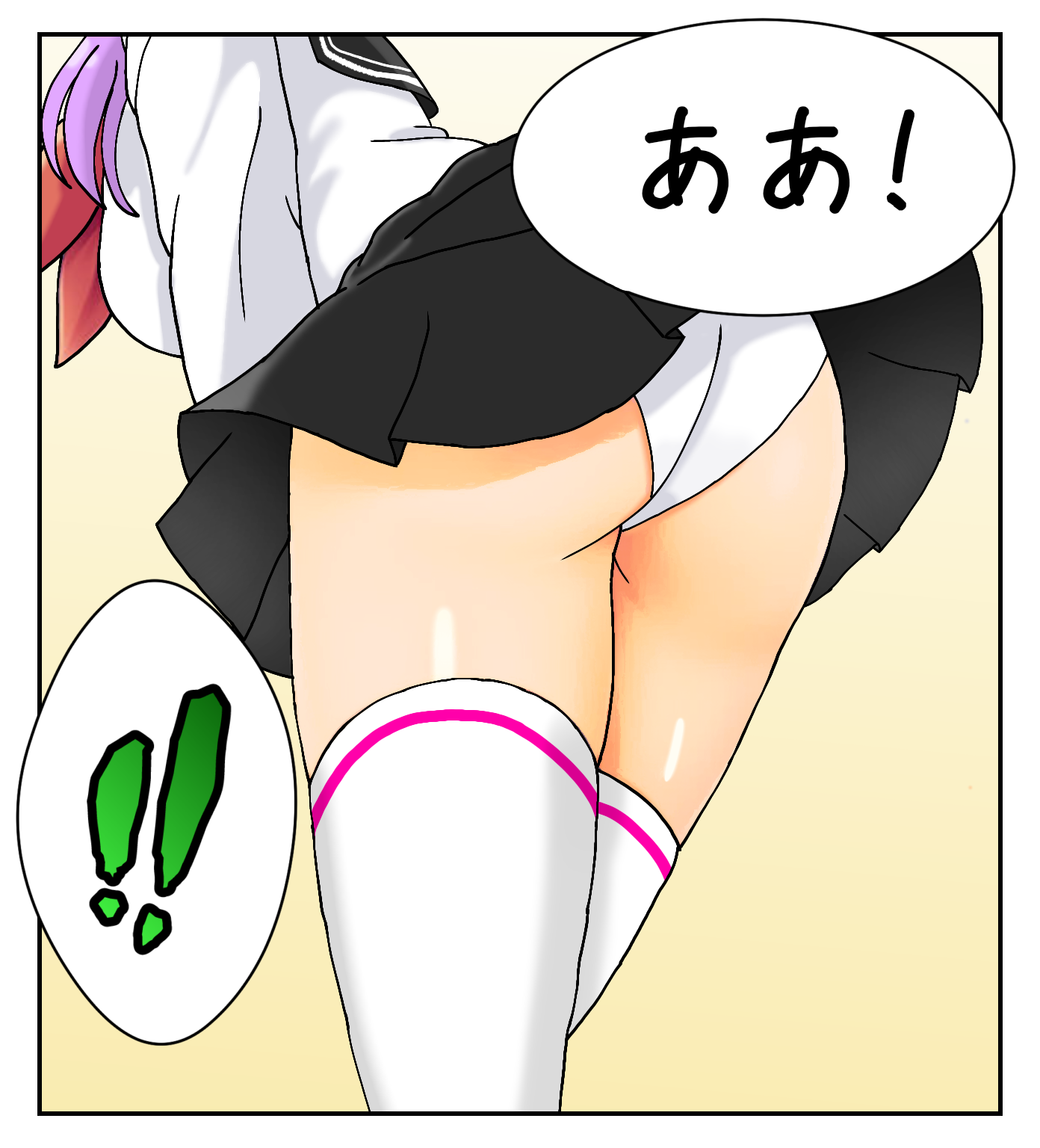
Example of panchira

Panchira (パンチラ) is a Japanese word referring to a brief glimpse of a woman's underwear. The term carries risqué connotations, similar to the word upskirt in English.

In anime and manga, panchira usually refers to a panty-shot, a visual convention used by Japanese artists and animators since the early 1960s. According to Japanese sources, the convention probably started with Machiko Hasegawa's popular manga Sazae-san, whose character designs for Wakame Isono incorporated an improbably brief hemline. The practice was later transferred to animation when Osamu Tezuka's Astro Boy was adapted for television in 1963. Confined mainly to harmless children's series throughout the remainder of the decade, panchira took on more overtly fetishistic elements during the early 1970s. From that point on, panchira became linked with sexual humor such as the kind found in many comedy-oriented shōnen manga.

The word is a portmanteau of "panty" (パンティー, pantī) and chira, the Japanese sound symbolism representing a glance or glimpse. While the more general term "upskirt" doesn't say anything about what the skirt (un)covers, panchira specifies the presence of underpants. Without underpants, the term ノーパン; nōpan would be more accurate.

== Origins ==
The development of panchira in Japanese popular culture has been analyzed by a number of American and Japanese writers. Many observers link the phenomenon to the Westernization of Japan following World War II. During the occupation, fashions, ideas, and media previously unavailable were accessed by the local population, leading to a slight relaxing of earlier taboos. Western-style clothing (including women's underwear) gained popularity in the post-war period, reinforced through numerous media outlets—magazines, newspapers, films, journals, and comics.

Traditionally, Japanese women did not wear underwear. On December 16, 1932, there was a fire in the Tokyo Shirokiya department store. Legend has it that some of the female staff tried to use their kimonos to cover their privates as they climbed down ropes from the higher floors, and accidentally fell to their deaths. Japanese newspapers began agitating for women to start wearing drawers (ズロース, zurōsu), but seemingly had little impact at the time. In a 1934 survey by a Fukuoka newspaper, 90% of the women surveyed were still not wearing 'drawers' a year and a half after the fire.

At least one Japanese source traces the beginnings of panchira to the release of The Seven Year Itch in 1955. The media coverage surrounding Marilyn Monroe's iconic scene fueled the emerging Japanese craze. According to architectural historian Shoichi Inoue, the practice of "scoring" a glimpse up young women's skirts became extremely popular around this period; "Magazines of the time have articles telling the best places where panties could be viewed". Inoue also writes that actress Mitsuyo Asaka spurred the popularity of the word chirarism (チラリズム, the thrill of catching a brief glimpse of a woman's nether regions) by parting her kimono to show off her legs in her stage shows in the late 1950s.

In 1969, the Japanese oil company Maruzen Sekiyū released a television commercial featuring Rosa Ogawa in a mini-skirt that gets blown up by the wind and her lips forming an 'O' in surprise. This led to children imitating her line "Oh! Mōretsu" ("Oh！モーレツ", "too much, radical"), and a fad for sukāto-mekuri (スカート捲り, flipping up of a girl's skirt). Ogawa subsequently appeared in a TV show, Oh Sore Miyo (Oh! それ見よ, literally "look at that", but actually a pun on "'O sole mio", a Neapolitan song translating to "my sunshine"), that again featured scenes of her mini-skirt blowing up.

By the late 1960s, panchira had spread to the mainstream comic industry, as fledgling manga artists such as Go Nagai began exploring sexual imagery in boys' comics (shōnen manga). Adult manga magazines had existed since 1956 (e.g. Weekly Manga Times), but it is significant to note the introduction of sexual imagery into boys manga. Millegan argues that the ecchi genre of the 1970s rose to fill a void left by the decline of Osaka's lending library network:

Japanese comics did not seriously begin exploring erotic themes until the sixties, with the collapse of the pay-library system (largely brought about by the unexpected success of cheap comic magazines such as Kodansha Publishing's Shōnen Magazine). Artists working for the pay-library system had already pioneered the depiction of graphic violence, and had proudly declared that they were drawing gekiga ("drama pictures"), not mere comics. In the search for realism (and readers), it was inevitable that sex would soon make an appearance.

As the Japanese comics market diversified, sex spread beyond the gekiga to just about every conceivable niche in the marketplace. The gekiga continued their realistic and often violent depictions, but the other major divisions in the manga world developed their own approach. Boys' comics began to explore "cute" sex, mainly consisting of panchira ("panty shots") and girls in showers.

== Academic perspectives ==
=== Generalized perspective ===
A generalized perspective is provided by Mio Bryce's analysis of classroom imagery in Japanese comics. Using Go Nagai's Harenchi Gakuen as a prime example, Bryce says that Nagai's storylines challenged long-standing social values by ridiculing traditional authority figures. Teachers in Nagai's manga were portrayed as deviants and perverts, engaging in various forms of aggressively voyeuristic behavior towards their female students. In this regard, panchira was employed as a form of social satire, voicing a general mistrust of authoritarian regimes.

In much the same vein, Jean-Marie Bouissou states that Harenchi Gakuen "smashed" the Japanese taboo against eroticism in children's comics, indicative of the rapidly changing cultural attitudes endemic to late 1960s Japan. Although the eroticism was confined mainly to panchira and soft-core cartoon nudity, the manga's impact was felt all across the country. Bouissou says the publication of Harenchi Gakuen sparked a "nationwide boom of sukāto mekuri (to flip up a girl's skirt)".

Jonathan Abel's work on the unmentionables of Japanese film argues that the cultivation of the underwear fetish through Roman Porno films after a police seizure may have first been evidence of covering up, but rapidly became a signifier of that which could never be attained. Abel's psychoanalytical approach then calls for the use of "panchira" as a term for eroticization of the invisible.

=== Male gaze ===
There are few academic studies dealing specifically with panchira; the subject has been touched on by several writers under the broader context of the male gaze. From the Western perspective, panchira is characterized by the sexual stereotyping inherent in patriarchal culture. Anne Allison makes reference to the convention in Permitted and Prohibited Desires, theorizing that the exposure of women's (or girls') underwear in ero-manga is constructed as an "immobilizing glance", in the sense that panchira is usually presented as a tableau in which the (female) object of desire is 'petrified' by the male gaze. She further postulates that this 'glance' is generally depicted as transgressive: the audience is permitted a glimpse of the female body (partially) unclothed, but it is always framed as a forbidden action. This prohibitive tableau permeates the entire genre, as virtually all ero-manga follow the same formula of transgression and immobilization.

Similarly, Anne Cooper-Chen states that the endlessly repeated image "of a male gazing at a female's panty-clad crotch" represents an archetypal manga panel. She supports Allison's view that women/girls portrayed in their underwear (or naked) is a common motif in Japanese comics, and is most frequently accompanied by a masculine "viewer" whose voyeuristic presence is indicative of the male gaze. However, in contrast to Allison, Cooper-Chen's observations are not confined only to the ero market. Rather, she argues that the dominant trope of frustrated desire and sexual violence may be extended to the manga mainstream.

== See also ==
- Burusera
- Gyaru
- Kogal
- Underwear fetishism
- Zettai ryōiki
