= Zettai ryōiki =

Area of bare skin in the gap between overknee socks and a miniskirt or shorts

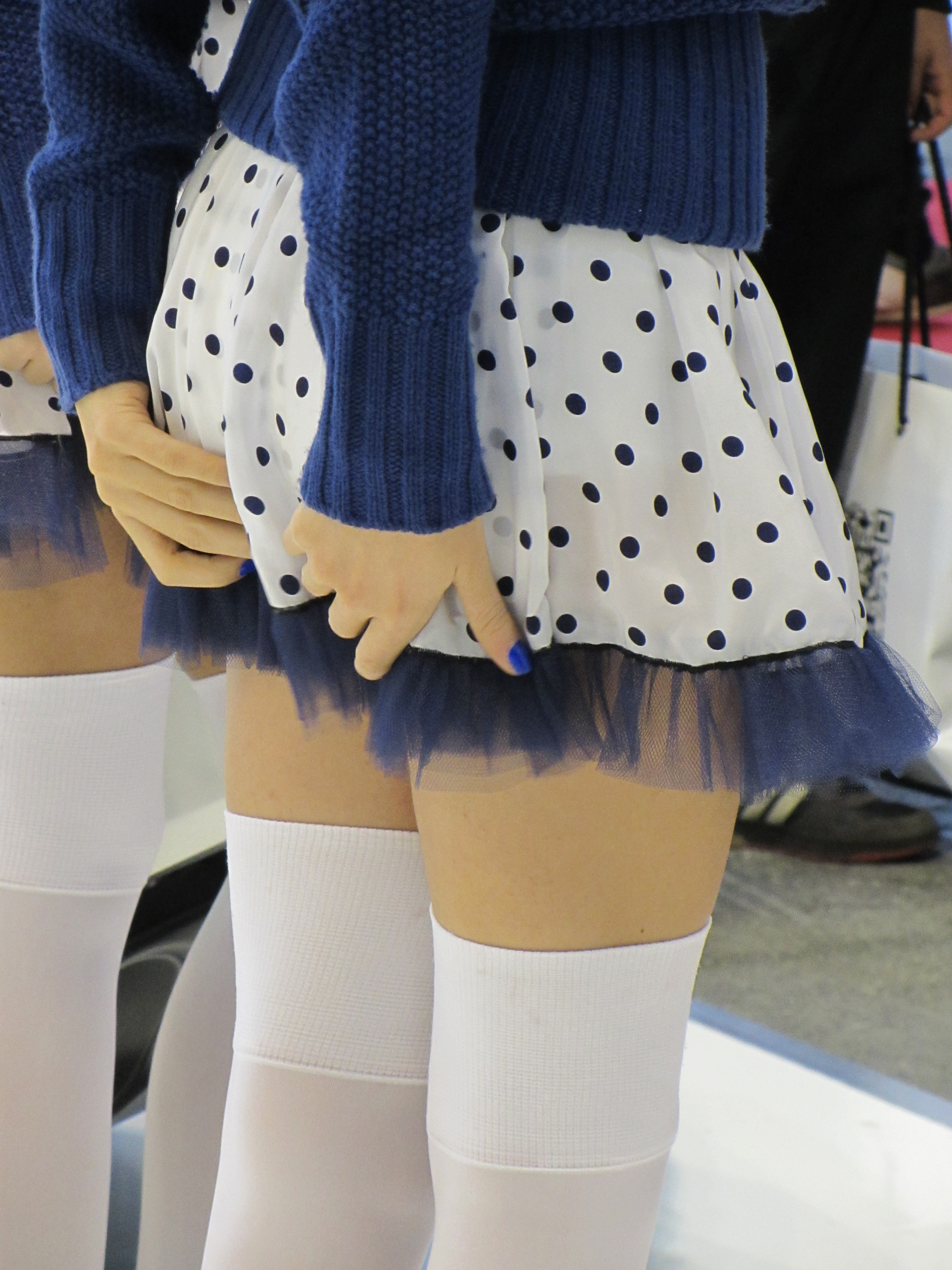
An example of zettai ryōiki on a model at the 2012 Bologna Motor Show

Zettai ryōiki (Japanese: 絶対領域; lit. 'absolute territory') refers to the area of bare skin in the gap between overknee socks and a skirt or shorts. It can also be used to describe the clothing combination. The term first became widespread in otaku slang as one of the attributes of moe characters in anime and manga, but it is now used by the general public in Japan.

== Classification and ideal proportions ==
Diagram showing the golden ratio for zettai ryōiki

The ideal zettai ryōiki ratio for the length of the miniskirt, the exposed portion of thigh, and the over-knee part of the socks is 4:1:2.5, with a tolerance of 25%. The ratio has also been referred to as a golden ratio (黄金比, ōgonhi) among fans.

Zettai ryōiki fans have also assigned letter grades for the ratio variants, from grade E (too much leg is seen, the skirt is also too long) to grade A (short skirt, high socks, short exposed area). Some fans have conceived of a grade S character which adds the criteria of a twintails hairstyle and a tsundere (cold on the outside, warm on the inside) personality.

== Origins ==
The term originates from the 1995 anime series Neon Genesis Evangelion, where it was used with a different meaning. In an insert leaflet that came with VHS cassettes, the expression "Zettai Kyōfu Ryōiki" (絶対恐怖領域; lit. 'Absolute Terror Field') (Ryōiki can translate to both 'field' and 'territory') was used as a translation of the English-language term "A.T. Field" (A.T.フィールド) from the anime into Japanese. An A.T. Field was a type of a protective energy shield, dubbed a "holy area no one can intrude upon" (何人にも侵されざる聖なる領域) and made a being using it impervious to attacks. Also, the term could refer to "impenetrability of souls" (心の壁). The Neon Genesis Evangelion manga also gave a shortened version of the term, Zettai Ryōiki, in furigana next to the words "A.T. Field". The idea of a "holy area no one can intrude upon" was where the current meaning of the term originated. The expression first spread in the otaku community and then became widely used outside of the subculture. For example, it is now included in the general-purpose dictionary Daijisen.

== Popularity ==
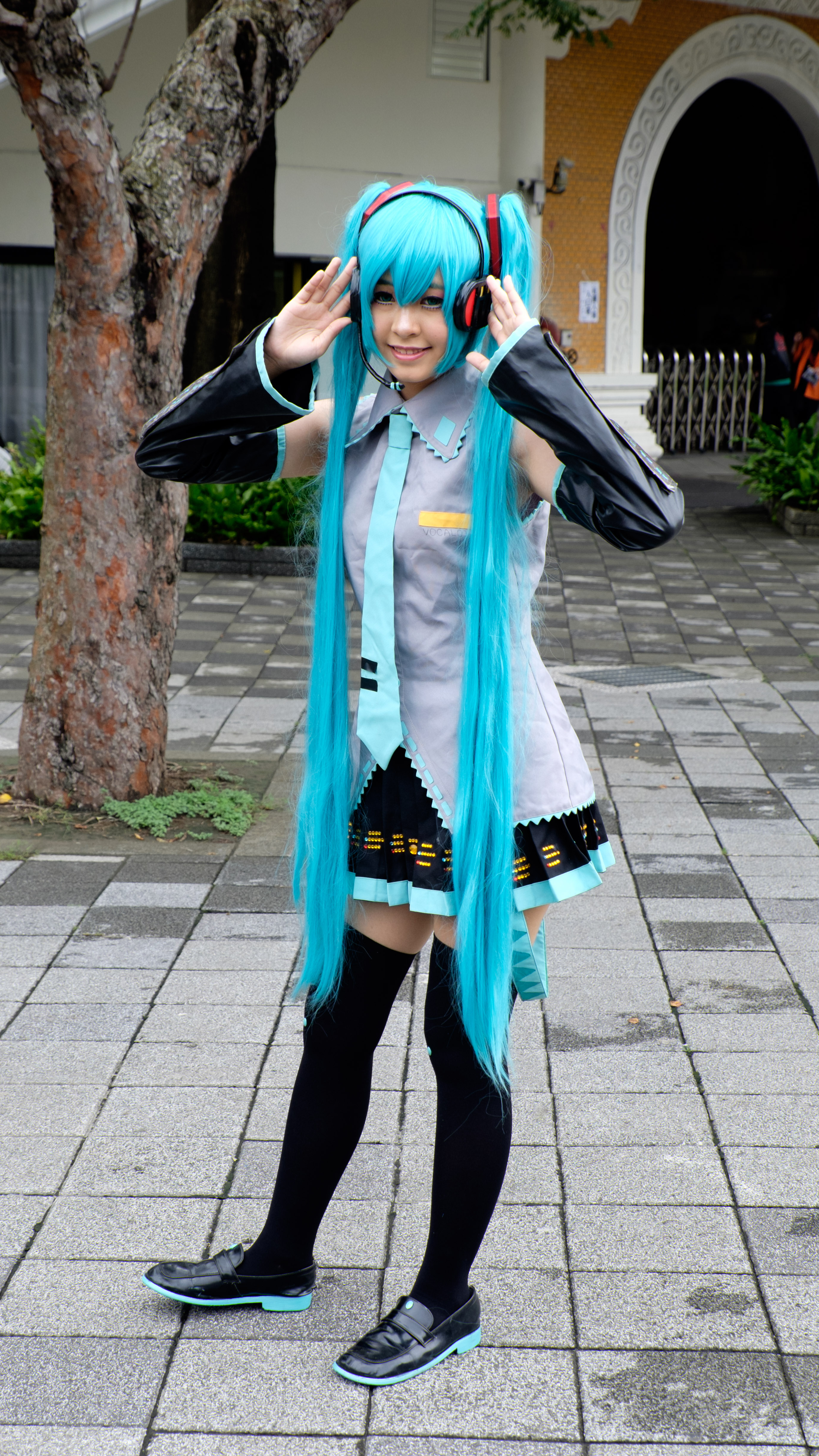
Cosplay of Hatsune Miku

Zettai ryōiki was originally only applicable to a combination of miniskirt and overknee socks, but with its popularization it started being used toward outfits which featured other kinds of hosiery and bottom clothing, including, for example, thigh highs, knee highs, stockings, garters, hotpants, and swimsuits.

The clothing combination is very popular in Japan. As with loose socks, a special "socks glue" can be used to glue the socks to the legs for a perfect look.

Japanese advertising agency WIT launched a campaign in 2013 which paid women to wear temporary tattoos on their upper thighs promoting various products and media. They were encouraged to wear skirts and long socks to highlight the area.

On February 8, 2014, a specialty shop named Zettai Ryōiki dedicated to overknee socks and tights opened in Akihabara, Tokyo.

== Trademark application ==
On February 13, 2006, the Japanese company Banpresto, which produced video games based on Neon Genesis Evangelion, filed two applications for registration of the term Zettai Ryōiki as a trade mark. Both applications were rejected on June 26 of the same year, on the basis of unpaid registration fees.

== See also ==
- Burusera
- Kogal
- Loose socks
- Panchira
- Uwabaki
