= Opera glasses =

Compact, low-power binoculars

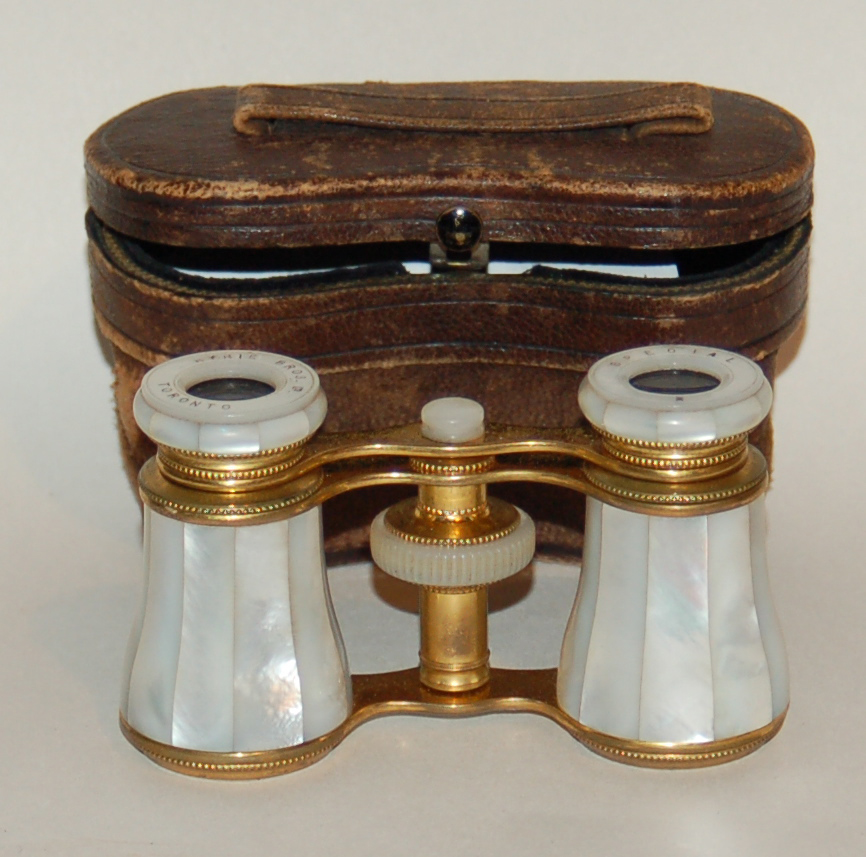
Mother of pearl opera glasses and leather case.

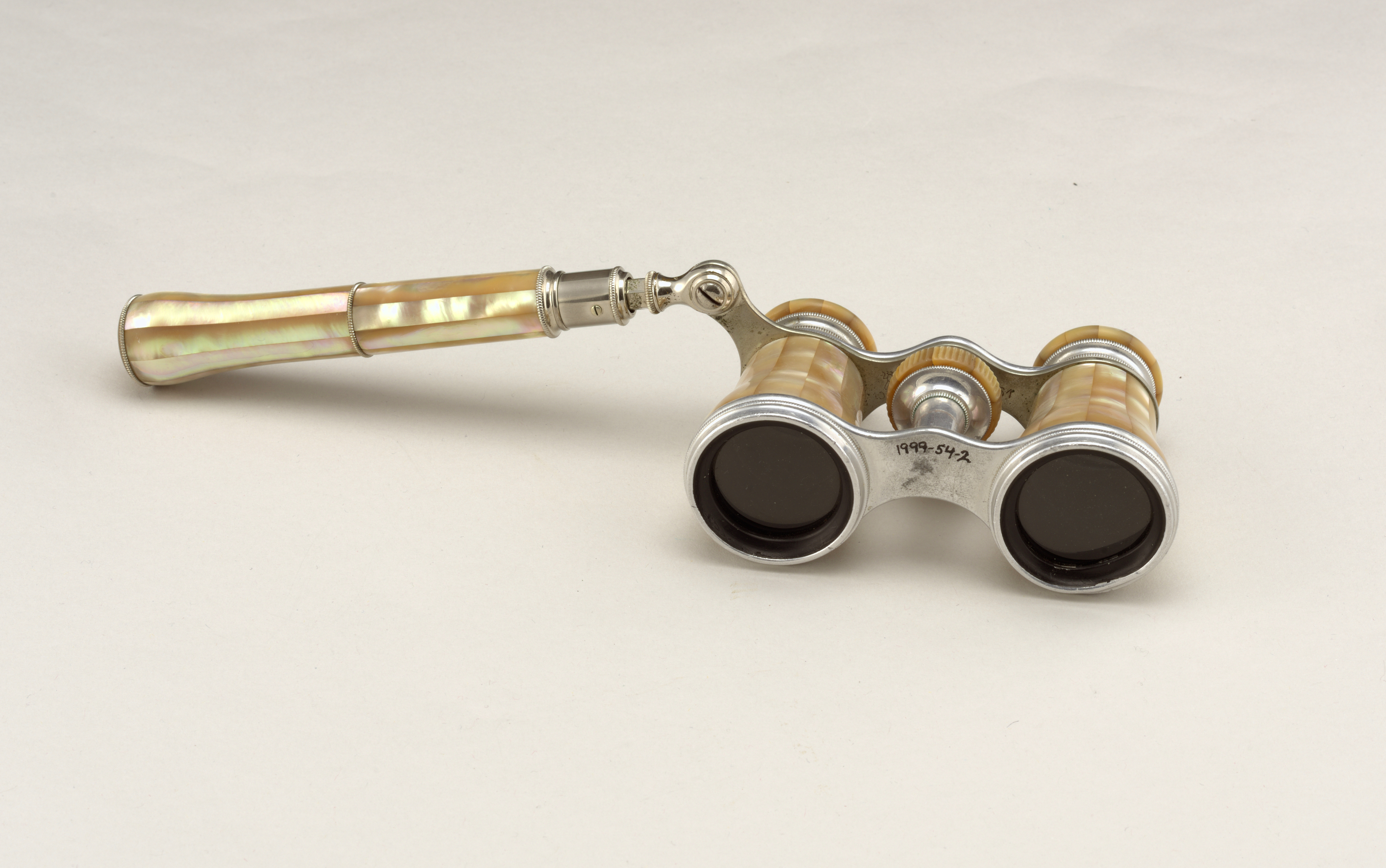
Opera glasses with handle, ca.1910

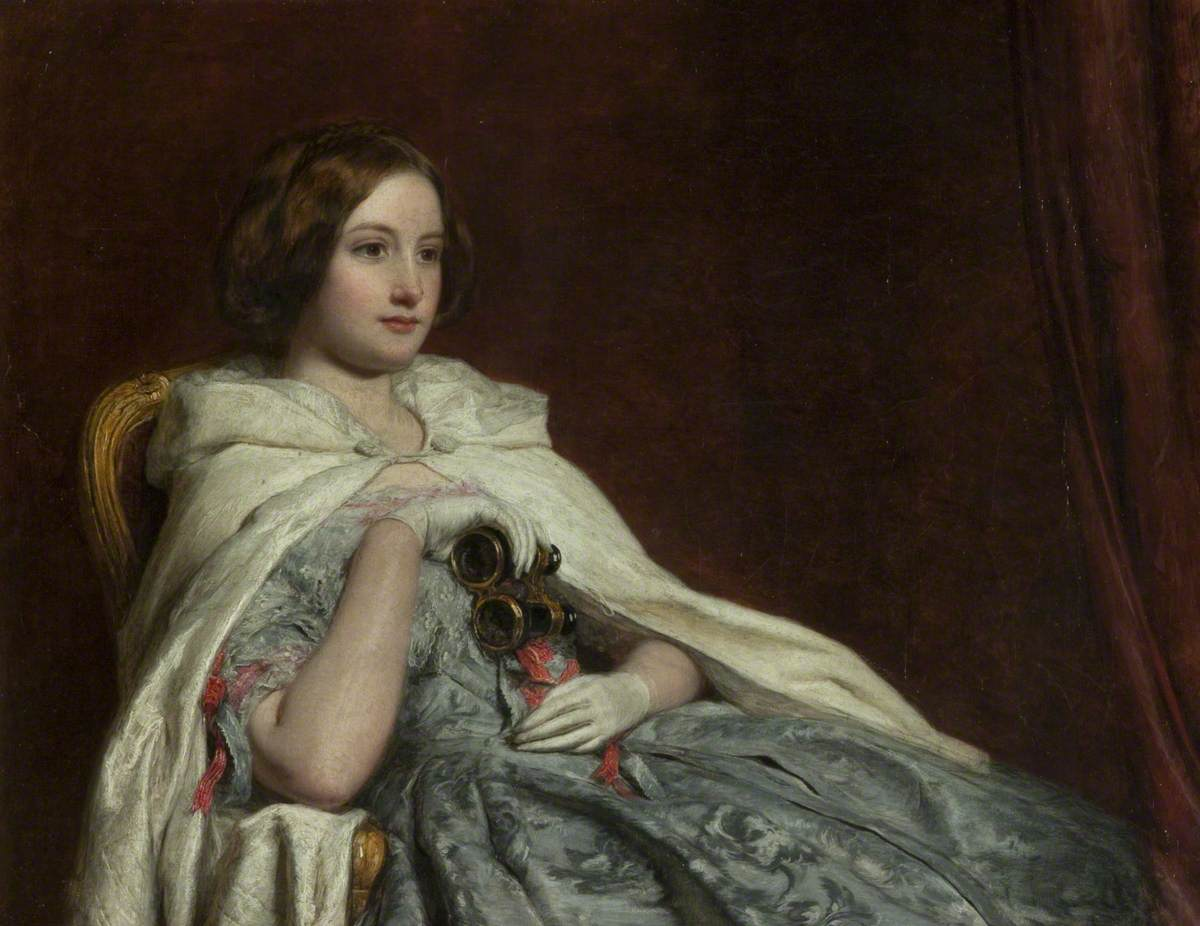
At the Opera by William Powell Frith, 1855

Opera glasses, also known as theater binoculars or Galilean binoculars, are compact, low-power optical magnification devices, usually used at performance events, whose name is derived from traditional use of binoculars at opera performances. A magnification power below 5× is usually desired for such use (vis-à-vis, for example, birding) both to minimize image shake and to maintain a large enough field of view. A magnification of 3× is normally recommended. The design of many modern opera glasses of the ornamental variety is based on the popular lorgnettes of the 19th century. Modern theatre binoculars are equipped with an LED flashlight which makes it easier to find a place in the dark.

In addition to the more stereotypical binocular type, folding opera glasses were another common design. They were made mostly of metal and glass, with a leatherette cover for grip and color. Although folding glasses have existed in one form or another since the 1890s, they were perhaps most popular in the mid-20th century and many from this era are marked "Made in Japan" or, less commonly, "Made in Occupied Japan". The design can still be purchased new, although the most common contemporary designs are now almost entirely plastic.

== See also ==
- London Opera Glass Company
- Monocular
- Spotting scope
- Opera hat
- Opera cloak
- Opera gloves
