= Opera hat =

Collapsible top hat

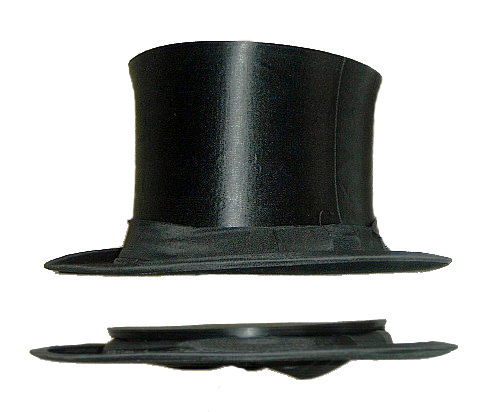
A collapsible opera hat, open (above) and folded (below).

An opera hat, also called a chapeau claque or gibus, is a top hat variant that is collapsible through a spring system, originally intended for less spacious indoor venues, such as the theatre and opera house.

Typically made of black satin, it folds vertically through a push or a snap on the top of the hat for convenient storage in a wardrobe or under the seat. It opens with a push from underneath.

== Name ==
Its French name chapeau claque is a composition of chapeau, which means hat, and claque, which means 'tap' or 'click'. The chapeau claque is thus a hat that folds with a click, and unfolds likewise.

In English, the hat model is usually referred to as a collapsible top-hat, gibus or more often opera hat.

== History ==
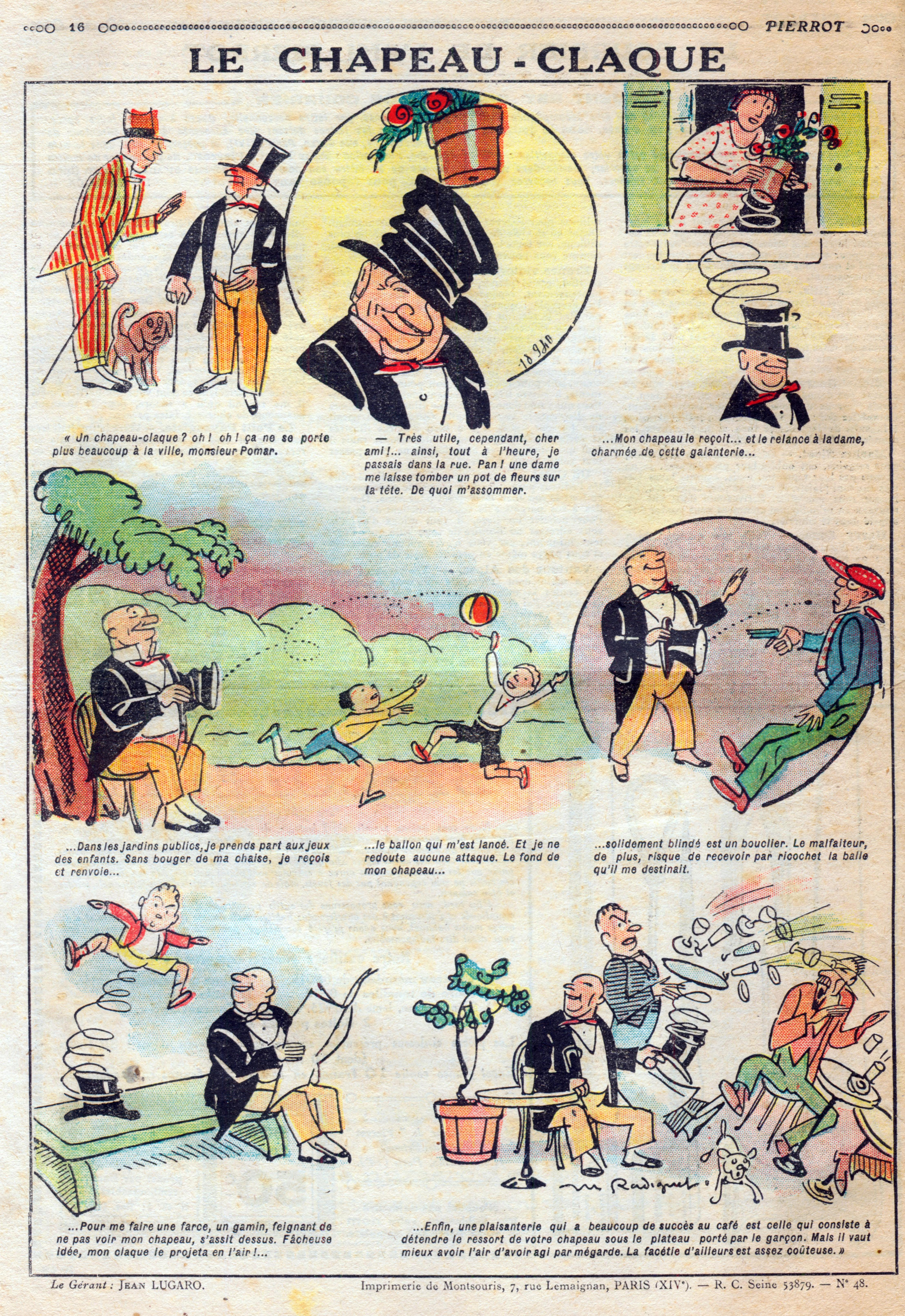
French comic book from 1926 that exhibits the advantages with the spring device mechanism of the collapsible top hat.

The construction may originally have been inspired by a historical hat model called chapeau bras ('arm hat'), made as bicorne or tricorne to be carried folded under the arm.

On 5 May 1812, London hatter Thomas Francis Dollman patented a design for "an elastic round hat" supported by ribs and springs. His patent was described as:

An elastic round hat, which "may be made of beaver, silk, or other materials." "The top of the crown and about half an inch from the top" as well as "the brim and about an inch, the crown from the bottom" are stiffened in the ordinary manner. The rest of the hat "is left entirely without stiffening," and is kept in shape by ribs of any suitable material "fastened horizontally to the inside of the crown," and by an elastic steel spring from three to four inches long and nearly half an inch wide "sewed on each side of the crown in the inside in an upright position." Then packed up for travelling, "the double ribbon fastened under the band is to be pulled over the top of the crown to keep it in a small compass."

Some sources have taken this to describe an early folding top hat, although it is not explicitly stated whether Dollman's design was specifically for male or female headgear. Dollman's patent expired in 1825. Operating from Poissy, Paris, France, around 1840, Antoine Gibus's design for a spring-loaded collapsible top-hat proved so popular that hats made to it became known as gibus.

The characteristic snapping sound heard upon opening a gibus suggested a third name, the chapeau claque, claque being the French word for 'slap'.

== See also ==
- List of hat styles
- Opera cloak
- Opera gloves
- Opera glasses
