= Elmer Batters =

American photographer (1919–1997)

Elmer Albert Batters
- Born: November 24, 1919; Milwaukee, Wisconsin, U.S.
- Died: June 25, 1997 (aged 77)
- Military career
- Allegiance: United States
- Branch: Navy
- Units: USS Sunfish (SS-281)
- Conflicts: Second World War

Elmer Albert Batters (November 24, 1919 – June 25, 1997) was a pioneer fetish photographer who specialized in capturing artful images of women with an emphasis on stockings, legs, and feet, He was among the first to popularize foot fetishism imagery as erotic entertainment.

== Early life ==
Batters was born in Milwaukee, Wisconsin. He enlisted in the United States Navy on December 27, 1941, from Los Angeles, California. He served on the USS Sperry (AS-12) from May 1942 until September 1942 and the USS Silversides (SS-236) from September 1942 to April 1943. He also served on the USS Sunfish (SS-281) from April 1943 until April 1944, and became a Yeoman 1st Class.

== Career ==
Batters started out publishing his photographs himself. In 1956, he founded and published Man's Favorite Pastime, which was the first leg-art magazine. Since the early 1960s, his work was featured in magazines such as Sheer Delight, Black Silk Stockings, Leg-O-Rama, Nylon Doubletake, and Tip Top, to name but a few. He paved the way for such critically acclaimed modern foot-fetish photographers as Ed Fox and Johnny Jaan.

One of Batters' favorite fetish models was a Rubenesque woman named Caruschka. Little is known about the model's life, but Batters was smitten with her, as were his fans. Several photo shoots featured the chubby, attractive Caruschka on a garden swing displaying her petite feet in classic foot-fetish "Andalusian-fan" poses, as well as exhibiting a set of fine high arches and well-formed calves.

"When I say Caruschka was my favorite model," Batters once wrote, "I don't just mean me. No girl in the history of my leg-art business has attracted so many admirers as she. Kinda hard to believe these days; I know she is a little heavier than the fashion. Caruschka has charisma, though; she still shines through. She also has a beautiful set of full shapely legs, firm and thrusting tits, and delicate, high-arch feet. But are these things what make us love a woman? I think not. I think love or even sexual attraction comes from the sparkle in a girl's eyes, the lift of her eyebrow, and the way her lips curl into that provocative smirk that hooks a man's soul like a hapless mackerel. This is Caruscha's strength. Her face seduces me even now--these 25 years later as it has seduced thousands of you. Go ahead and give in to her. Even back in the unliberated (years) when these photos where [sic] taken, Caruschka was a girl who loved to have men masturbate over her. Yeah, she was a tease but isn't every woman worth a damn?"

As a foot-fetish pioneer starting in the 1950s, Batters helped make this formerly closeted field of sexual interest more acceptable. Near the end of his life, Batters was rediscovered by German publisher Benedikt Taschen, who produced three books of his work, including From the Tip of the Toes to the Top of the Hose and Legs That Dance to Elmer's Tune. Taschen became acquainted with Batters' work in Leg Show magazine, where editor Dian Hanson introduced a new generation of fetishists to his photos during the 1980s and 1990s. Today, original photographic prints by Batters fetch up to $1,500 among fetish-art collectors.

Batters' military career is mentioned briefly in the out-of-print nonfiction book The Lonely Sky by test pilot William Bridgeman. This book tells the story of the U.S. Navy's experimental Skyrocket supersonic plane program of the 1950s.

Taschen has published several books featuring the work of Elmer Batters.
