= Gown-and-glove striptease =

Type of dance

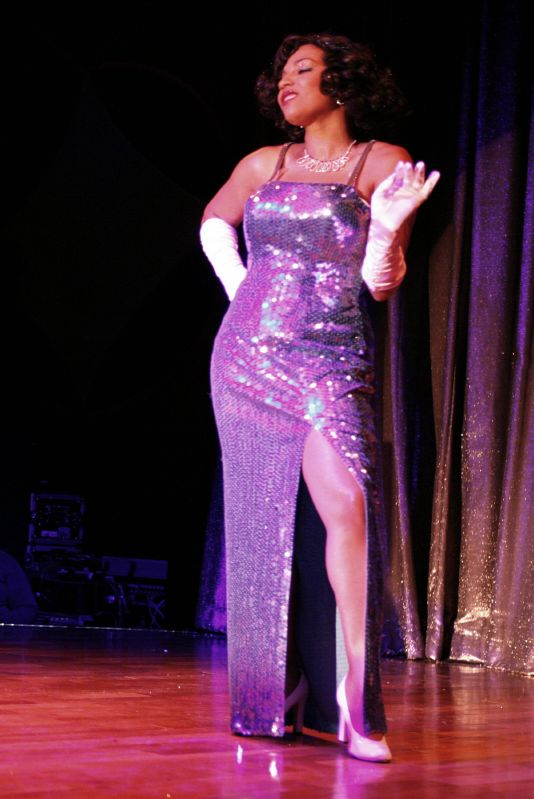
Desire D'Amour at the Miss Exotic World Pageant, 2006. Photo Michael Albov

The gown-and-glove striptease is considered a very traditional form of the striptease. This routine developed in America and spread to Europe. The performer, usually female, is dressed elegantly in an evening gown with a back zipper and elbow length opera gloves. She then removes the gloves one at a time, in a slow teasing manner, before similarly removing the gown. This type of dance is exemplified by actresses like Rita Hayworth in Gilda (1946) and Natalie Wood in Gypsy (1962) and by current neo-burlesque performers like Dita Von Teese, Bonnie Delight, Bettsie Bon Bon and Havana Hurricane.

== See also ==
- Diamonds Are a Girl's Best Friend, vis-a-vis Marilyn Monroe and Jane Russell
- Put the Blame on Mame, a la Rita Hayworth
