= Uniform fetishism =

Sexual fetishism relating to uniforms

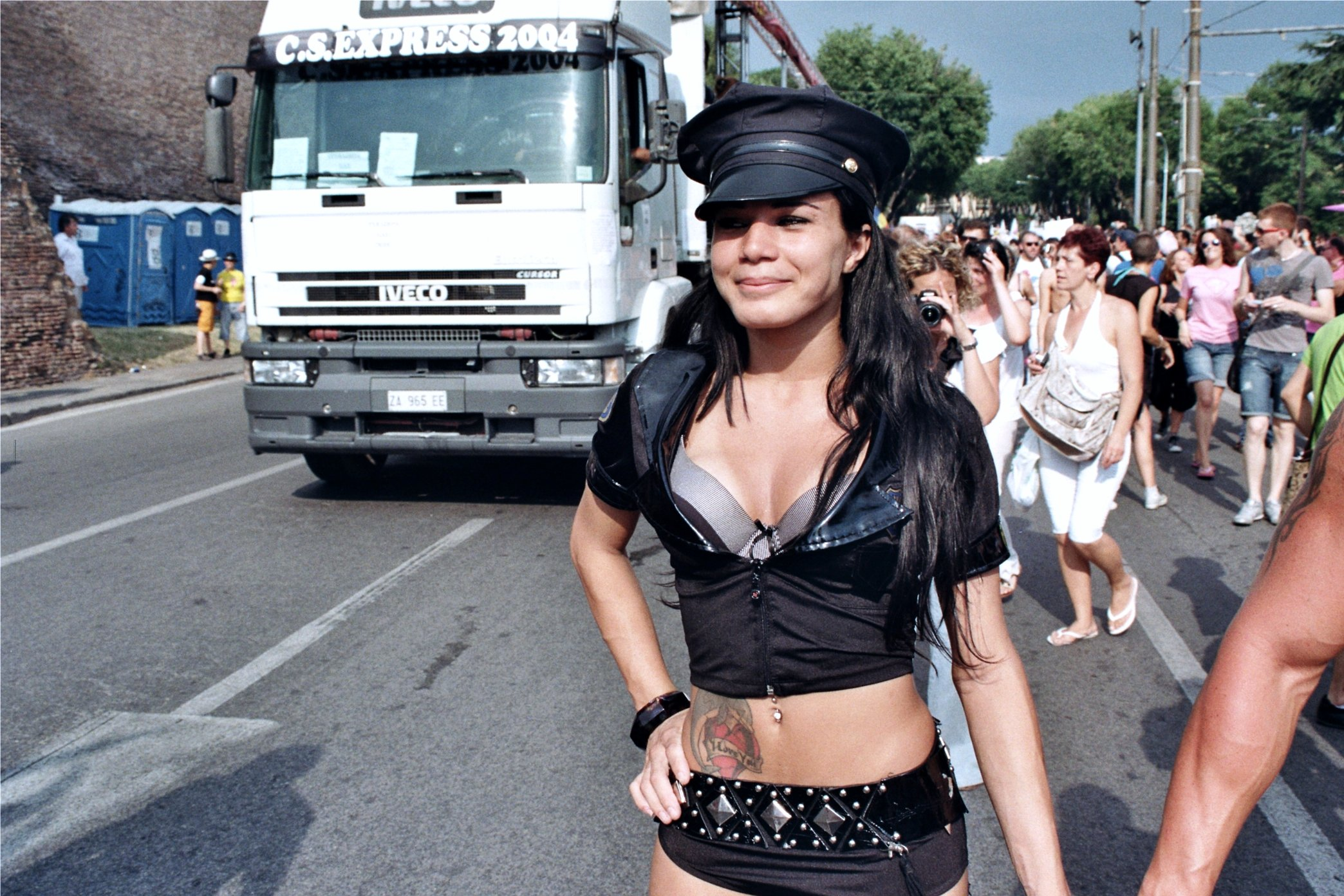
Brazilian pornography actress Fernanda Barros wearing a cop costume at a 2010 pride event in Rome

Uniform fetishism is a particular type of clothing fetishism in which an individual is sexually aroused by uniforms. It is a form of sexual fetishism. Uniform fetishism has been associated with a variety of different uniforms, including schoolgirl and cheerleader uniforms, French maid uniforms, and uniforms associated with police or military organisations.

== Types of uniforms ==
Among the most common uniforms in uniform fetish are those of a police officer, prison officer, soldier, schoolgirl, cheerleader, nurse, French maid, waitress or fast food and Playboy Bunny. Some people also regard nuns' habits or even aprons as uniforms. The uniforms may be genuine, realistic, or they may be sexualized through the use of a very short miniskirt, a very long hobble skirt or a corset, through the use of stockings, fishnet tights, or high heels, or by being made of leather or latex, according to preference. Sometimes uniforms are used according to the activity being done. For example, someone may wear a nurse's uniform to administer an enema or a police uniform to handcuff and cage someone. Two people may dress as inmates for cellmate-on-cellmate activities in a prison setting or as a submissive to a third (prison guard) roleplayer. This may add a sense of authenticity to the game play. A stripper dressed as a police officer is a popular fixture at birthday and bachelor parties. The "officer" begins with a mock "arrest", often using handcuffs, of the guest of honor before going into a dance routine.

=== Schoolgirl uniform ===
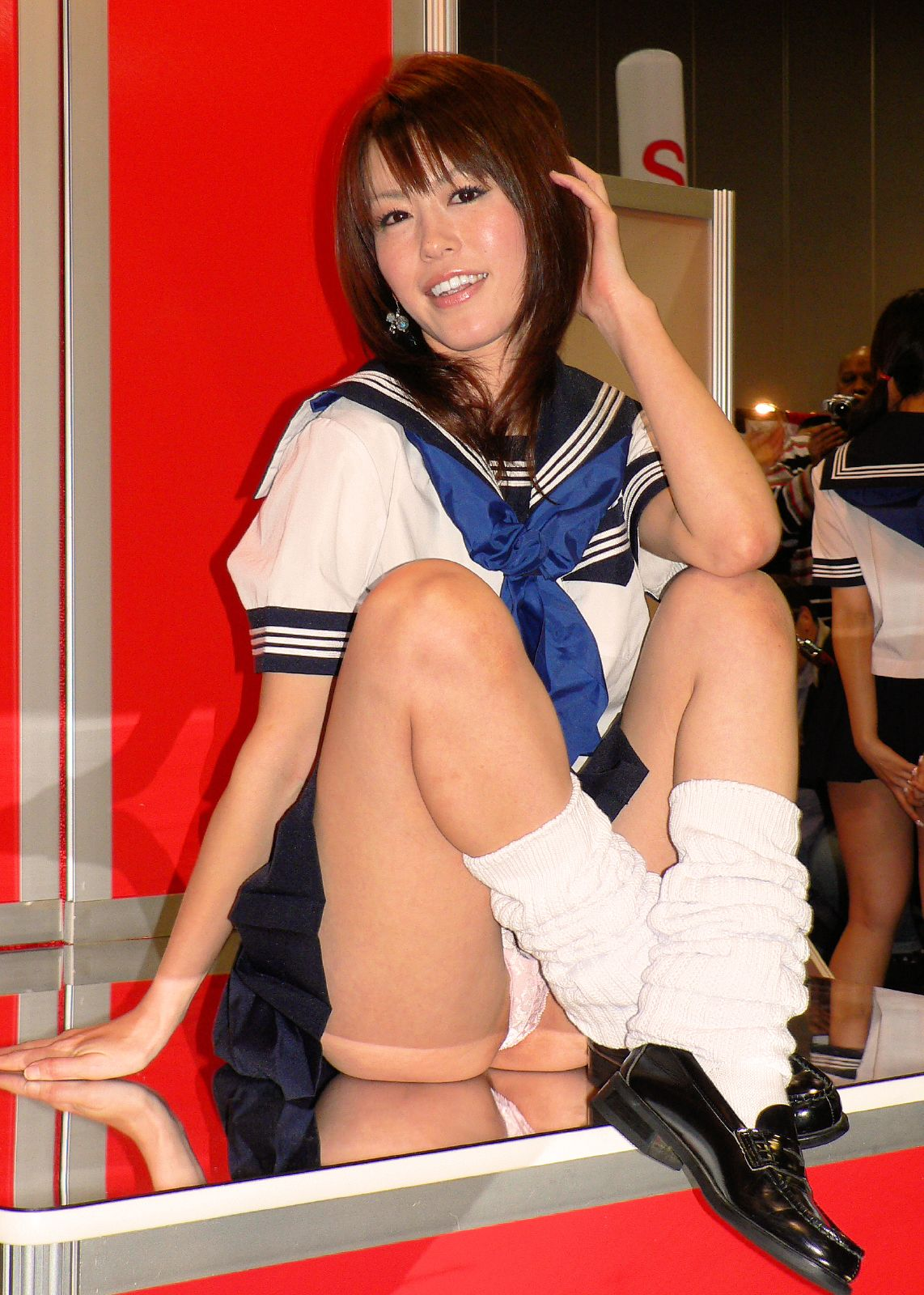
Japanese adult actress Ai Himeno in a kogal-style school uniform

A schoolgirl uniform fetish is a sexual fetish in which someone derives sexual pleasure from viewing others dressed in the typical schoolgirl uniform, or from themselves dressing in that manner. The fetish is common in both Japanese and Western pornography, prostitution, and other forms of adult entertainment, making it one of the most widespread clothing-oriented fetishes worldwide. In Japan, the fetish often uses a modified version of the traditional Japanese school uniform adapted to the more sexualized form of the kogal fashion style.

The schoolgirl image may appeal to women because it allows them to project a more youthful, innocent, or virginal image. These same reasons can explain part of the look's appeal to males as well. It may also have a less sexual aspect of nostalgia, recalling memories of a simpler time in one's life. Indeed, fetishes often start to develop at puberty, when schoolgirls may have been unattainable objects of desire, for example, among men who attended an all-boys school. Often, the contrast of a fully developed woman in a childlike role is appealing, in the same manner as other forms of sexual role-playing.

In practice, the schoolgirl role is usually one that is sexually compliant or playfully "naughty" and submissive, while the schoolgirl's partner plays an adult authority figure such as a stern parent, teacher, or principal. This can include fantasies or reenactments of childhood events, including corporal punishments such as spankings, canings, or paddlings, among others, or dominating situations such as bullying or seduction.

=== Cheerleader uniform ===
Another popular clothing fetish involves cheerleader uniforms. The popularity of the provocative Dallas Cowboys Cheerleaders in the 1970s established the cheerleader as an American icon of wholesome sex appeal. An entire subgenre of sexploitation films emerged, with titles such as The Swinging Cheerleaders (1974) and Cheerleaders' Wild Weekend (1979), plus countless pornographic films starting with Debbie Does Dallas in 1978. As a result, the uniform remains an American favorite for Halloween costumes, costume parties, exotic dancers, specialty prostitutes, and role-playing couples.

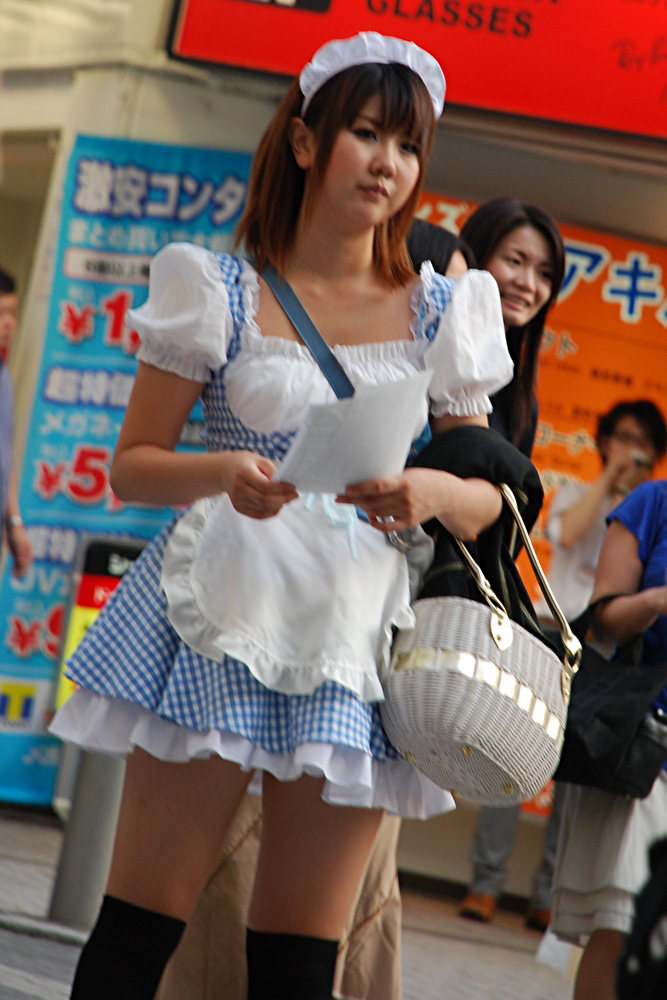
Japan's Cosplay restaurant: French maid cosplay

=== French maid uniform ===
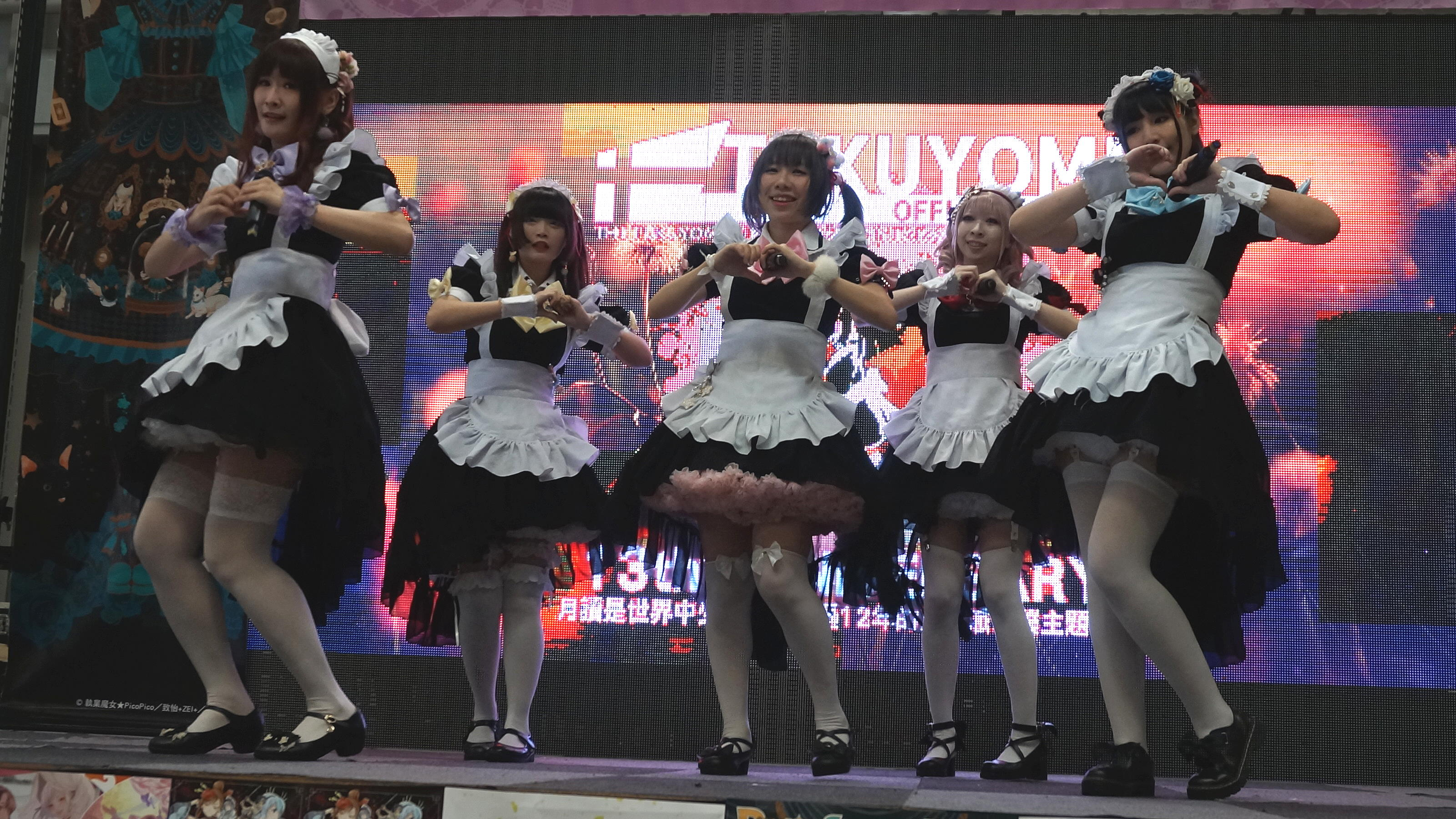
Maid cafés are known for waitresses dressed in maid costumes performing acts on a stage.

A popular costume for sexual roleplay, the French maid uniform, worn by a servant who traditionally defers to her wealthy master, carries an implicit dominance and submission symbolism. When worn during sexual foreplay or by practitioners of the BDSM lifestyle, the maid may perform humbling (or even humiliating) acts of servitude, such as dusting, mopping, serving drinks, or forniphilia (e.g., posing as a footstool or other forms of human furniture). In Friends with Money (2006), Jennifer Aniston's character (who is a cleaner by profession), dresses as a French maid for her boyfriend, first vacuuming and using a feather duster, then having sexual intercourse whilst still in costume. On the NBC TV series 30 Rock (May 2009, season 3, episode 3), Aniston (guest-starring) once again wore a skimpy maid costume in an attempt to seduce Alec Baldwin's character, Jack Donaghy. In Desperate Housewives (Season 1, Episode 21), Lynette (Felicity Huffman) wears a French maid outfit bought at a lingerie store to spice up her marriage.

Though not strict to historically accurate uniforms, the French maid outfit has an easily recognizable pattern and black-and white theme that remains the template for other forms of the costume.

The typical French maid costume includes:

- A black dress with white trim, with a full skirt at or above knee length
- White half-apron, usually with ruffle or lace
- A ruffled or lace headpiece
- Long stockings or tights. These can be white or black and vary from design to design
- High heels
- Feather duster
- White or black lace garter

Optional accessories depend on design and context:

- Choker necklace
- Pearls
- Other cleaning equipment

The outfits are frequently worn to fancy dress or costume parties, and also used in drama/theater.

=== Military, police, and Nazi chic ===
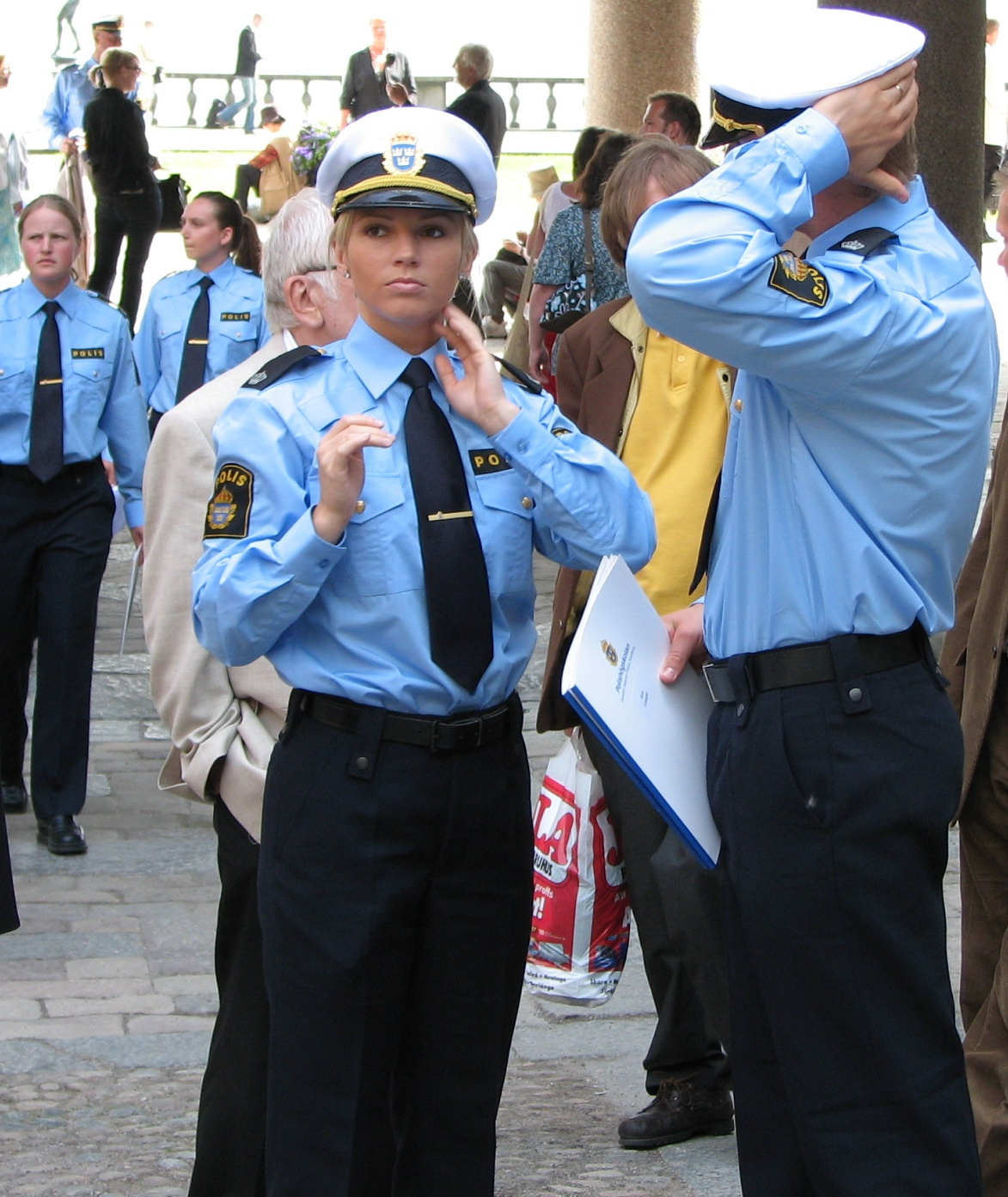
Genuine outfits, such as police uniforms, can have fetish appeal.

Uniforms worn by military personnel, firefighters, and police officers present an image of enhanced masculinity and authority that often has a strong sexual appeal to straight women, straight men, and gay men. For example, the popular 1970s disco group The Village People dressed up as gay fetish stereotypes, including a police officer, military man, and leather-clad biker. In 1997, the Breeches and Leather Uniform Fanclub (BLUF) was founded, aimed at gay and MSM men with a (leather) uniform fetish mainly.

Nazi chic, particularly the SS officer's black uniform, has been widely adopted and fetishized by underground gay and BDSM lifestyle groups, as well as Japanese cosplay. Parts (and variations) of the uniform, such as the leather boots and peaked cap, have become standard wear for the female dominatrix and male master or dominant. In the 1970s, the uniform's association with sadomasochism and forbidden sexuality was embodied in a wave of violent Nazisploitation films such as Ilsa, She Wolf of the SS (1975) and the controversial art-house film The Night Porter (1974). In the latter film, a topless Charlotte Rampling has an iconic scene performing a Marlene Dietrich song for a group of concentration camp guards while wearing parts of an SS uniform. Her ensemble of army boots and pants, suspenders, peaked cap, and black opera gloves has often been imitated, such as Madonna's banned "Justify My Love" video in 1990. A slightly less revealing version of this outfit was worn by Lady Gaga in her 2009 music video for the single "LoveGame".

== See also ==
- Cosplay restaurant
- Breastaurant
- Fetish fashion
- Ecchi
- Sexual roleplay
- Underwear fetishism
