= London Opera Glass Company =

- Industry: Manufacturing
- Founded: 20 May 1913, London, England
- Headquarters: Sandwich, Kent
- Products: Opera glasses

The London Opera Glass Company was officially formed in London, England on 20 May 1913 to produce opera glasses for theatres in London.

The company's purpose was to offer fashionable theatre goers in London's West End, technology that had started in Vienna and Paris in the 19th century. Opera glasses were not new at the time of the company's formation. In fact, they were a fashion accessory at the end of the 19th century and the beginning of the 20th century. It was not until 1912 that the London Opera Glass Company installed discreet dispensers on the backs of seats, enabling patrons to rent them for 6d.

Since the formation of the company, around 11 million patrons have used its opera glasses to view theatre productions such as Noël Coward's comic play Hay Fever in 1925 and The Phantom of the Opera musical by Andrew Lloyd Webber. In 2009, two major London theatres, the Comedy Theatre and the Savoy Theatre, installed £1 opera glasses from the company throughout their auditoriums. As of October 2011, around 1.8 million people have used the company's opera glasses at the Lyceum Theatre during performances of the Lion King since it opened in October 1999.

The company is now based in Sandwich, Kent. It supplies over 60 theatres in the United Kingdom and the distinctive red glasses are made in the UK. The company makes charitable donations, including to The Theatres Trust and the Marlowe Theatre.

London Opera Glass Company donated 30 pairs of glasses to the Wildlife Trust of South & West Wales for children to use.

== See also ==
- Opera glasses
