= BLUF (fetishism) =

Leather fetish organization

- The Breeches and Leather Uniform Fanclub
- BLUF banner showing men wearing leather uniforms including breeches. This banner was used as a logo from 2000 to 2009.
- Formation: 1997; 29 years ago
- Founded at: Montreal, QC, Canada
- Type: leather fetishist fraternity
- Legal status: active
- Purpose: friendship between like-minded members
- Members: free
- Key people: Leon Jacobs (founder, webmaster 1997–2009), Nigel Whitfield (director, webmaster 2009-)
- Parent organization: BLUF Ltd
- Funding: donations, sale of merchandise
- Website: www.bluf.com

The Breeches and Leather Uniform Fanclub (BLUF) is an international fraternal organization of (mainly) gay men and MSM sharing a fetish interest in breeches and leather uniforms. Being a part of the larger leather subculture, the club focuses on leather fetishism in general, and boot and uniform fetishism in particular, often in the context of sexual roleplay. The sexual aesthetic is similar to the exaggerated masculinity seen in the work of Tom of Finland.

Founded in 1997, membership has risen to almost 6,000 in 2025, with members originating from 63 countries (although more than half based in the USA, UK and Germany). Within the larger fetish community, BLUF has become a well-known name, and 'bluf', used as an adverb or adjective, has become synonymous with a formal leather look.

== Membership and dresscode ==
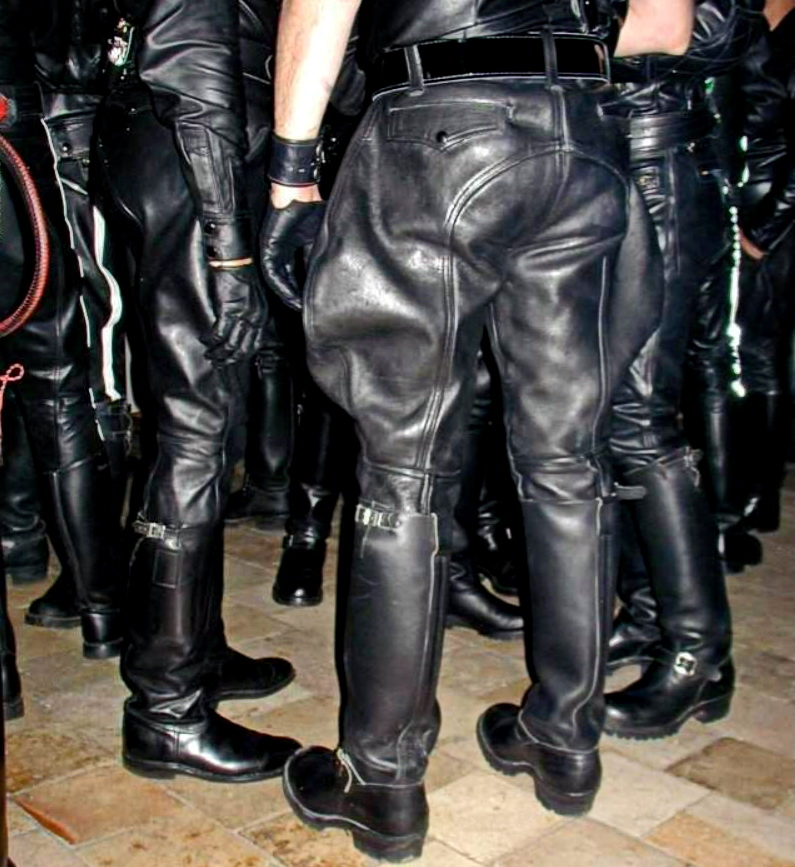
Men in black leather breeches and tall boots at BLUF's 5th anniversary party in the Black Tulip Hotel in Amsterdam, 2002

Membership is free and open to those who identify as men (including trans men). Although most members are gay white men from North-American or European countries, all races, nationalities and sexual orientations are welcomed. Members must be above the age of consent in their home countries. In order to join the club, the applicants are required to respect a strict dress code and a set of guidelines explained on the club's official website.

In BLUF's definition, breeches are flared-hip riding breeches (with "balloons" on the side of the legs) worn inside tall leather jackboots. Breeches can be either made of leather or fabric. Often, but not always, breeches are part of a (partly) leather uniform, often in combination with a uniform shirt, a formal tie and a Sam Browne belt. Some wear leather uniforms reminiscent of World War II era uniforms, but without the Nazi regalia which explicitly are banned at BLUF events and on the website. Other common uniforms worn are those of American-style police motorcycle patrol, or other police or military forces around the world.

Once the application is accepted, new members are assigned a number that identify them among the other members. Most members use a pseudonym on their profile page, along with their BLUF number. Members can contact each other through instant messaging, or meet at a BLUF event, organized by volunteers worldwide. The website further offers a calendar of BLUF-related events, a magazine with photos of past events, lists of leather businesses and fetish photographers, a blog covering club-related topics, a discussion forum, and a web shop.

== History ==
BLUF started as a simple HTML-based Internet site in October 1997 in Montreal, Canada. It was founded by Dutchman Leon Jacobs as a club for men into breeches and/or leather uniforms:

I was living in Montreal then and I had just discovered the joys of Internet. I joined Leather Navigator, which at that time was the only internet platform for leather men. Being disappointed with the absence of any kind of dress code, I started BLUF. I contacted a few friends by email, sent postcards to others (not everybody had a computer in those days), and informed them about the new club. Some of them joined. At the beginning, almost all new members were American. I had met quite a few at parties in Canada and the U.S. Not many Europeans had internet access then. The site consisted in those days of a picture gallery, a list of members, a list of admirers (for those that couldn't meet the dress code requirements), an online magazine and (a little later) a forum. Access was free. The cost of the server was covered by me. I was the webmaster and maintained the site. In September 1998, the first BLUF party was held during Folsom Weekend at the Loading Dock in San Francisco. Although we only had about 150 members then, the party became a huge success and is still remembered as one of the best in BLUF history. — Leon Jacobs, "A short history of BLUF", BLUF.com, 2014

The original website contained separate areas for members, associate members and admirers. Members could not edit their own profile: pictures had to be sent to the webmaster for approval. Those that took an interest in the breeches and leather uniform fetish but were not able to meet the dresscode, could register as an admirer, without access to the members-only pages. Their profiles could only be seen by full members. After three positive reviews from members, they were given access to the member pages as associate members. The website included a picture gallery that was available to both members and non-members who subscribed to Adult Check, later ManCheck. This helped to cover the cost of running the site. In 1999 Jacobs moved back to the Netherlands. More Europeans joined and gradually, the emphasis shifted from North America to Europe.

In the Summer of 2000, the website was redesigned (BLUF v1.2), which included a new banner/logo. The possibility to become a BLUF admirer or associate member was discontinued in August 2003. In October 2003, a new website (BLUF v2) was launched, with a MySQL/PHP database which allowed for searches, but still without direct messaging. Around this time the club reached 1,000 members. Also in 2003, the porn movie Leather and Law was released, a collaboration between BLUF and gay venue Vagevuur in Eindhoven, the Netherlands.

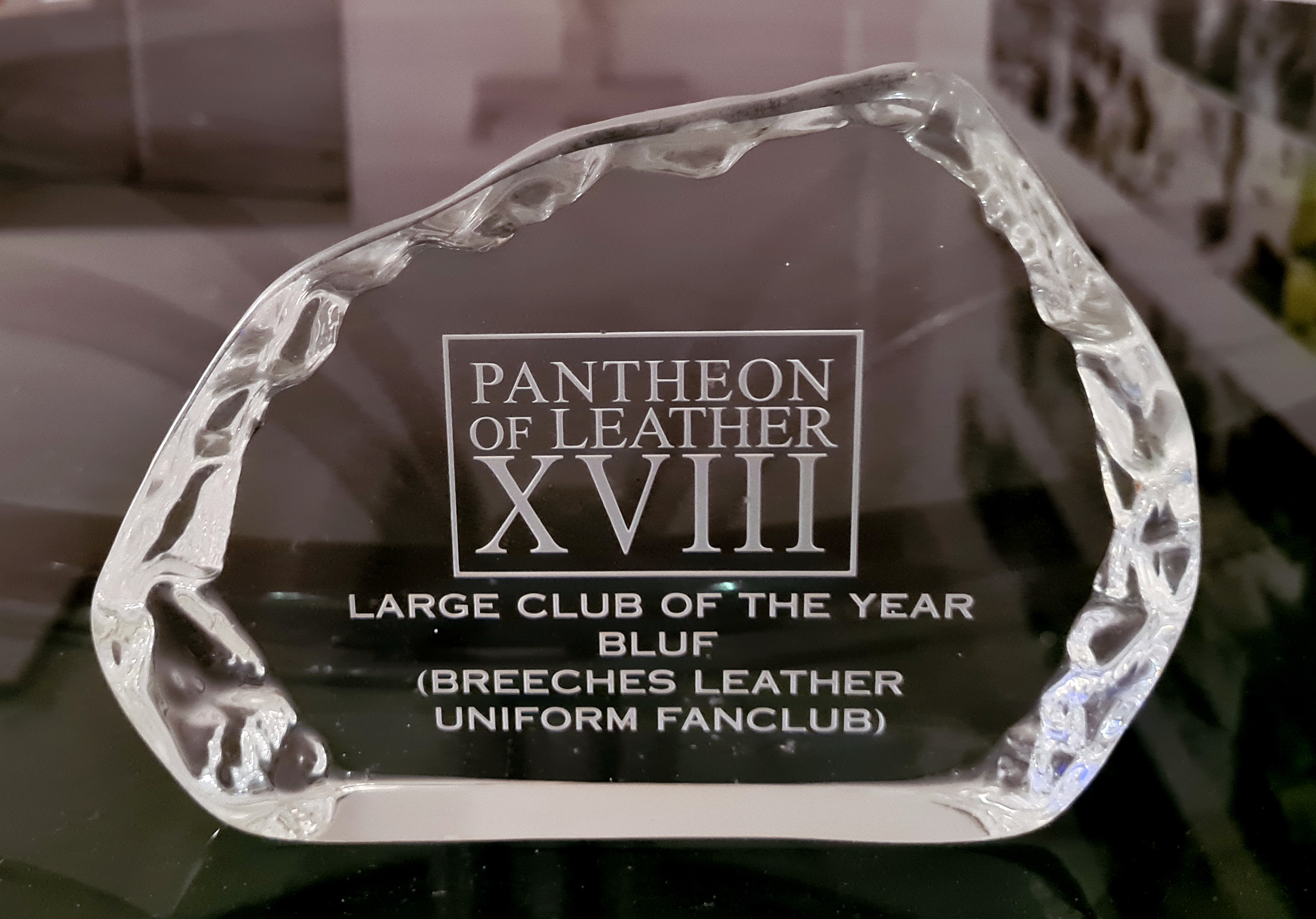
BLUF's Pantheon of Leather Award, 2008

In 2008, BLUF received the "Large Club of the Year" award as part of the Pantheon of Leather Awards. Membership had grown to 2,500.

In June 2009, Jacobs handed over the club to Nigel Whitfield, a British computer programmer and journalist for computer magazines. Whitfield rewrote the entire website (BLUF v3), which went online in December 2009. The new site included the ability to send instant messages between members and upload photos directly. The ManCheck galleries were discontinued. In 2011, a new logo was revealed.

In 2012, BLUF's 15th anniversary year, the club reached 3,000 members. Throughout this year, 67 local events were organized by BLUF volunteers around the world. In January 2013, during Belgium's Leather Pride, BLUF won the X Award for "Fetish Organisation 2013". Also in 2013, a BLUF Membership Card was introduced for donators, creating a more stable financial base. Membership remained free of charge.

BLUF ltd, a limited company, was founded in 2016, giving the club a legal status. An online store was added to the website in 2018, allowing for the sale of BLUF merchandise. In the same year, another X Award was won. In 2019, around 200 local BLUF events took place in cities around the world, some of them with a strict dress code, others with a more relaxed dress code, usually referred to as BLUF socials.

In late 2022, BLUF celebrated its 25th anniversary. Membership reached 5,000 a few months later.

In November 2024, after a fifteen-year presence on X, formerly Twitter, BLUF decided to leave the social media platform after concerns about online safety for LGBT people in general and trans people in particular, after the Twitter take-over by Elon Musk.

In 2025, Whitfield decided to step down from running BLUF. A team of three administrators from the United Kingdom and Germany was appointed to take over the management of the club.

== See also ==
- Recon (app)
- FetLife
