= Opera cloak =

Long loose luxurious coat, worn over evening dress

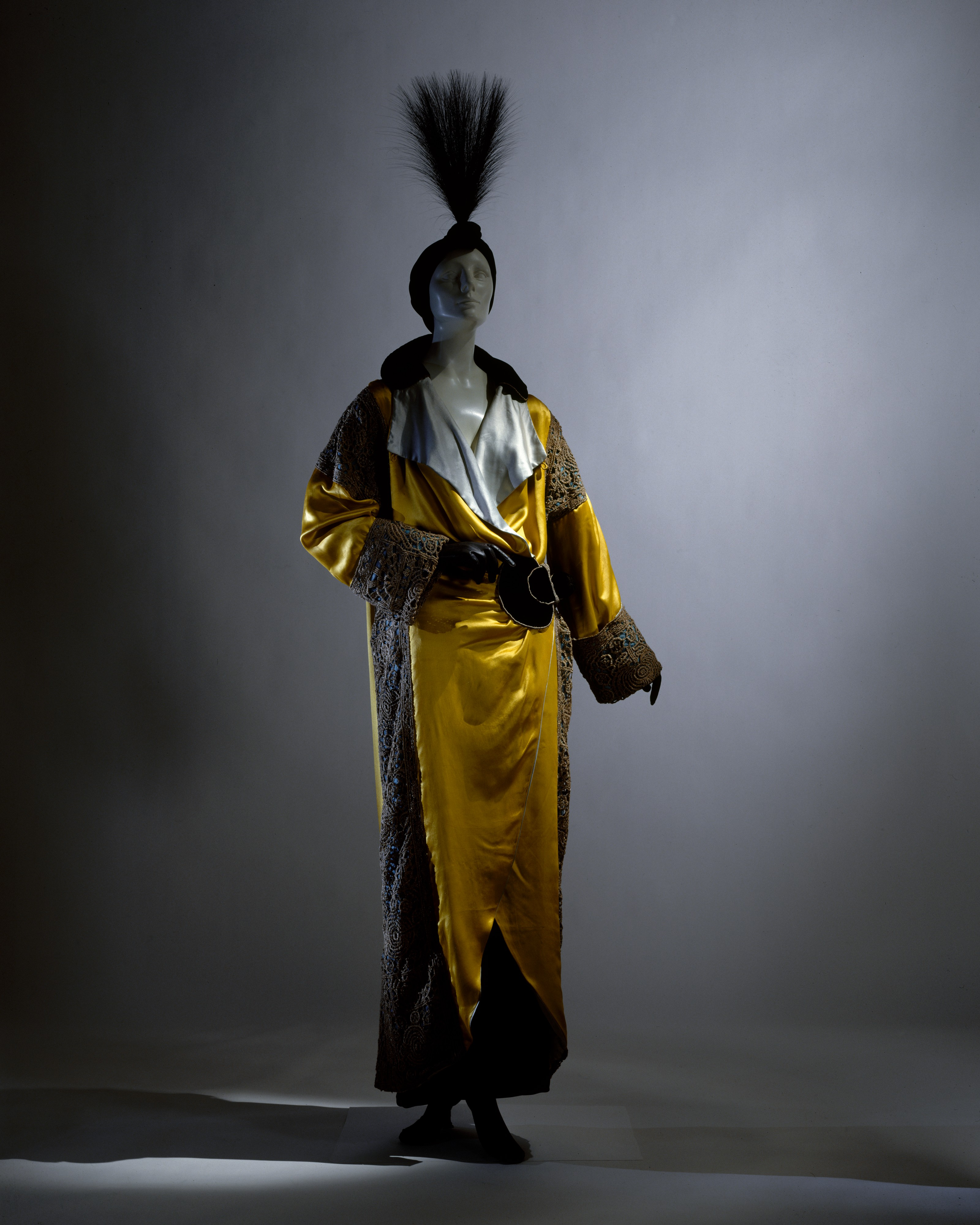
Opera cloak

An opera cloak is an ankle- or floor-length loose-fitting cloak of dark, luxurious fabric such as velvet, brocade or satin, to be worn over an evening gown for a woman or a man's white tie tail coat or black tie dress suit, named after its typical designation for the opera. It may be described as a fitted cloak (sometimes with sleeves), generally not as tailored as a coat. For white tie, men's opera cloaks are frequently worn with a walking stick and top hat or opera hat.

Like cloaks and capes, the opera cloak is usually lined in a coloured expensive fabric, such as silk, or a weave like satin, for a more opulent look. An opera cloak often has an elegant or dramatic collar, and may have padded sleeves. It may or may not be trimmed in fur. It often has an elaborate braided rope instead of buttons at the neck.

== See also ==
- Opera glasses
- Opera gloves
