= Underwear fetishism =

Sexual fetishism relating to undergarments

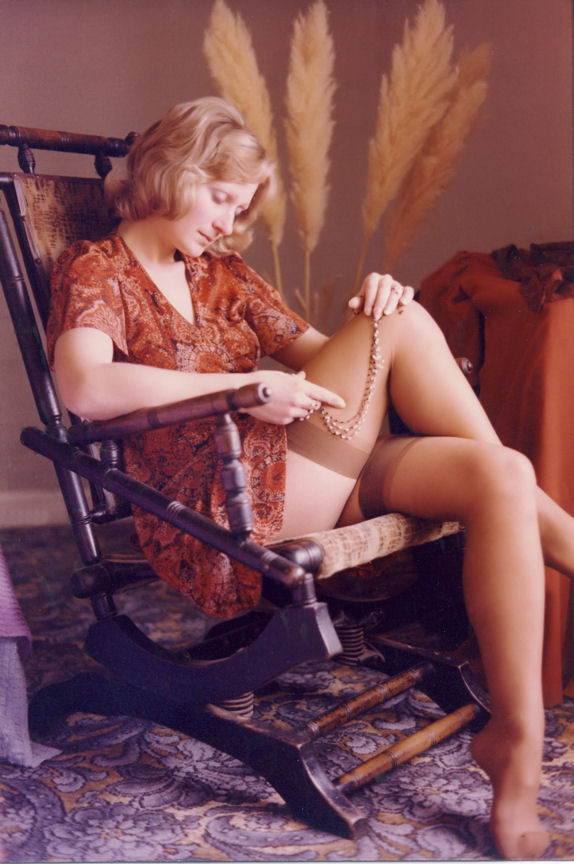
One type of underwear fetishism involves stockings.

Underwear fetishism is a sexual fetishism relating to undergarments, and refers to preoccupation with the sexual excitement of certain types of underwear, including panties, stockings, pantyhose, bras, or other items. Some people can experience sexual excitement from wearing, while others get their excitement when observing, handling, or smelling the underwear worn by another, or watching somebody putting underwear on or taking it off.

Underwear fetishism is not considered as paraphilia unless it causes distress or serious problems for the person or those associated with them.

== Prevalence ==
To determine the relative prevalence of different fetishes, Italian researchers obtained an international sample of 5,000 individuals from 381 fetish-themed discussion groups. The relative prevalence was estimated based on (a) the number of groups devoted to a particular fetish, (b) the number of individuals participating in those groups, and (c) the number of messages exchanged. Within the sample population (adults online engaged in sexual discussions), 12% indicated a sexual preference for underwear.

== Panties ==
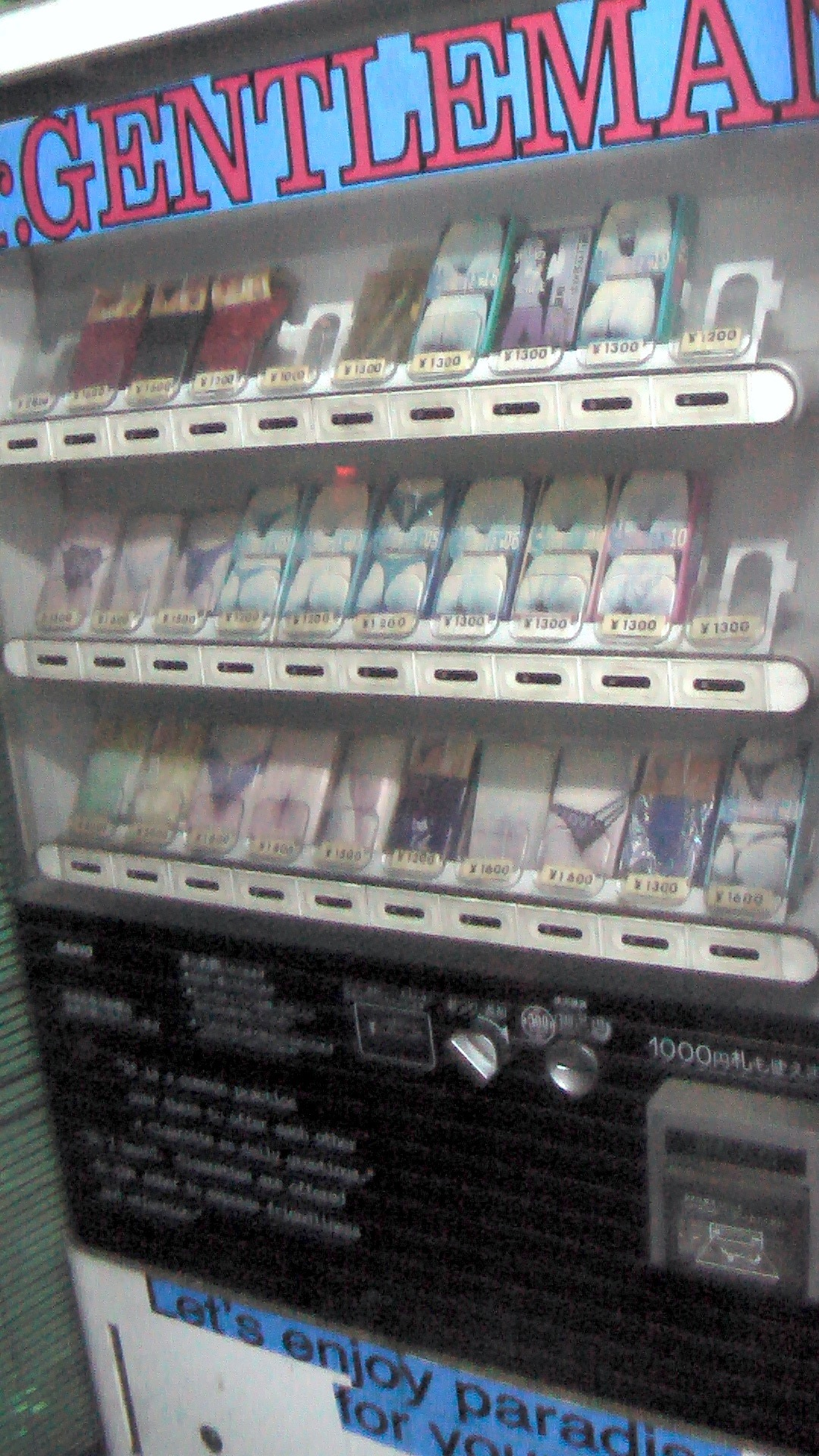
A Japanese vending machine selling used panties for burusera

Panty fetishism is a fetish in which one eroticizes panties (or similar styles of underwear).

In Japan, a common types of panty fetish involves used panties; this industry has a long-established brick-and-mortar presence, known as burusera shops.

== Stockings and pantyhose ==
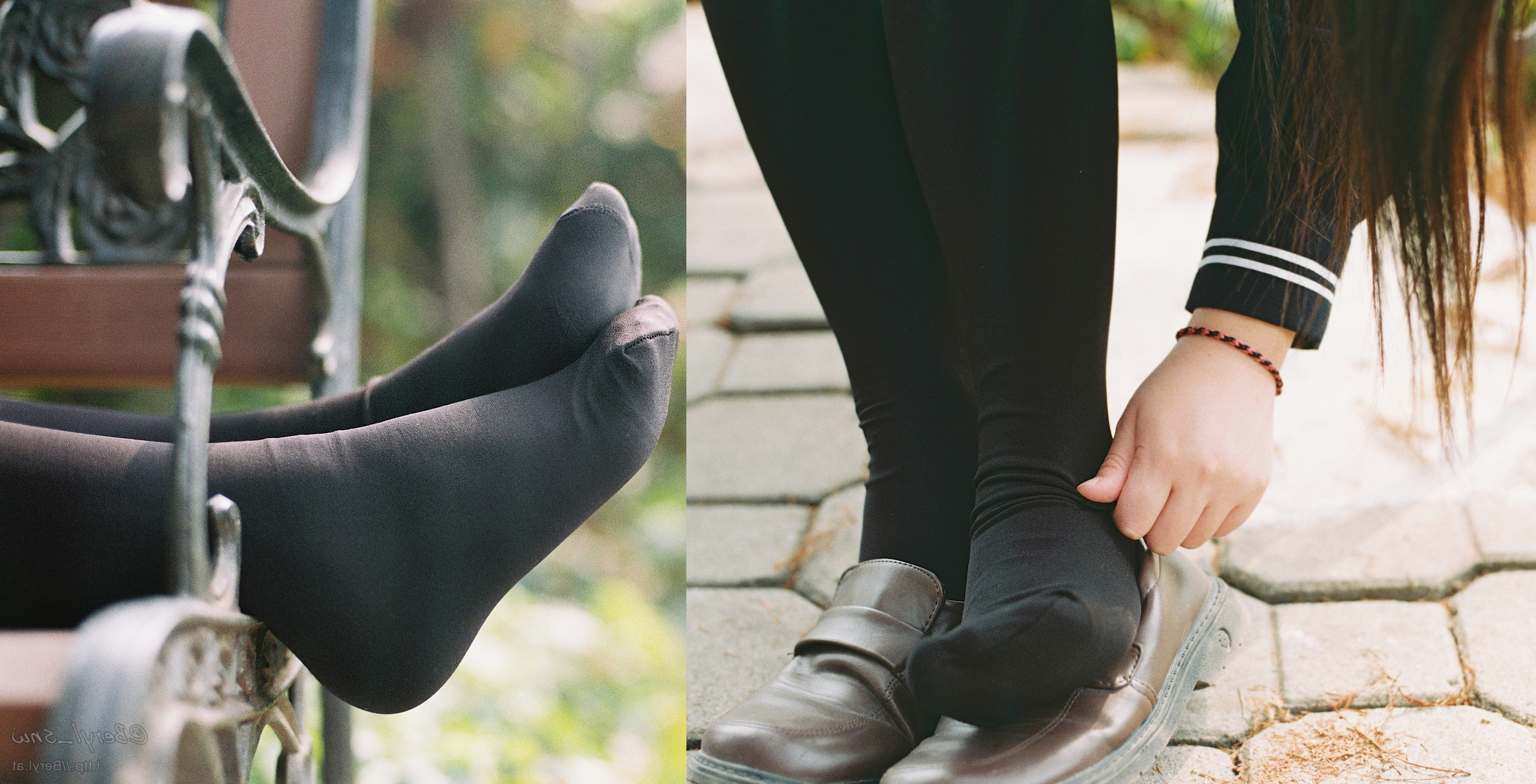
A girl wearing black knee high stockings

Some people experience sexual excitement from the look or feel of women's stockings and pantyhose.

Stocking fetishism may include other feminine clothing which contributes to enhancing the fantasy. Some men find it arousing to collect and wear stockings, panties, and suspender belts. In some cases, this is done for the purpose of momentary sexual stimulation. Others wear such a complete combination under a pair of trousers or beneath a business suit on a regular daily basis.

The growth of internet purchasing has enabled men to browse through many different assorted underwear offerings anonymously. Some manufacturers and retailers specializing in lingerie and associated women's apparel cater to the needs of men who are interested in acquiring and wearing these garments.

Such fetishists may also be divided into many subcategories relative to their attraction to certain types of stocking/pantyhose. Some find fishnet stockings more arousing compared to other forms, for example. Other preferences include fully fashioned (seamed) stockings, seamless stockings, designer stockings, luxury stockings, reinforced heel and toe stockings (RHT), stay-ups, etc.

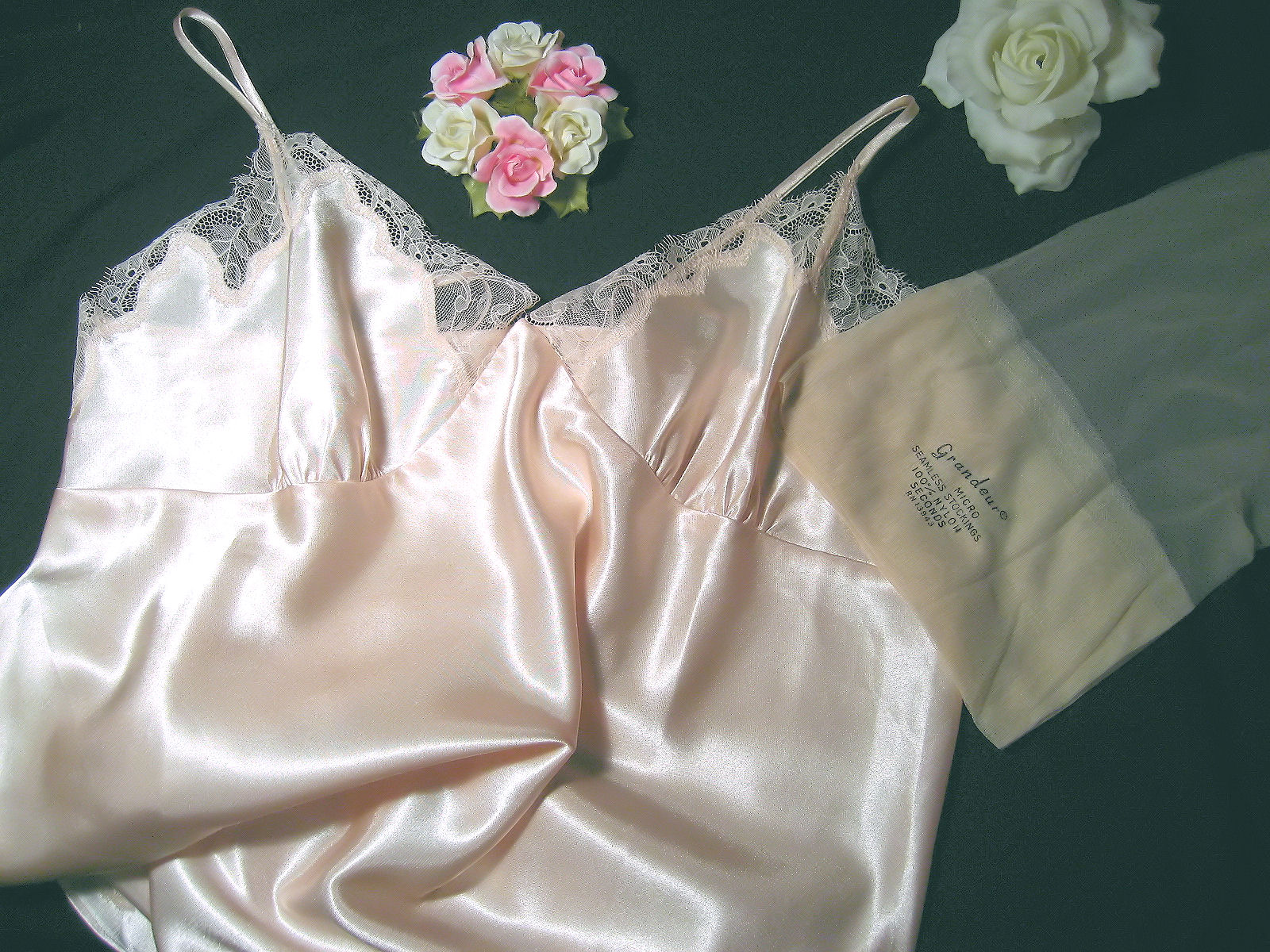
Silky full stockings and slip

== Silk and satin ==
Some people experience sexual excitement from the look or feel of articles made of silk or satin fabric. Such interest is usually directed towards the person wearing silk or satin, but it can also be directed towards the garment itself, or to the feel of the garment when worn.

The principal materials which are considered erotic are charmeuse silk (silk woven so that it has a sheen) and satins (such as acetate satin and rayon satin), but other materials with similar properties, such as polyester and spandex are also admired.

== Jockstraps ==
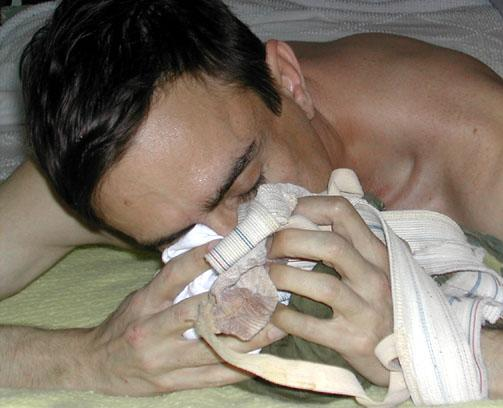
A man sniffing a jockstrap

Jockstrap fetishism is the term applied to the sexual arousal from handling, wearing, watching another put on, or sniffing a jockstrap. To quote on jockstrap sniffing, "jock[strap] sniffing specifically refers to the practice of inhaling odors from unlaundered jockstraps for the purpose of sexual stimulation. Practitioners, (usually male) are known as 'jock sniffers' and acquire unlaundered jockstraps either by swapping such garments with like-minded individuals or by swiping them from locker rooms, lockers or unattended gym bags".

== See also ==
- Clothing fetish
- Cross-dressing
- Elmer Batters
- Rubber and PVC fetishism
- Upskirt
- Underwear as outerwear
- Uniform fetishism

== Bibliography ==
- Kunzle, David (2004). Fashion and fetishism. Sutton. ISBN 0-7509-3808-0.
