= Evening glove =

Formal glove reaching above the elbow

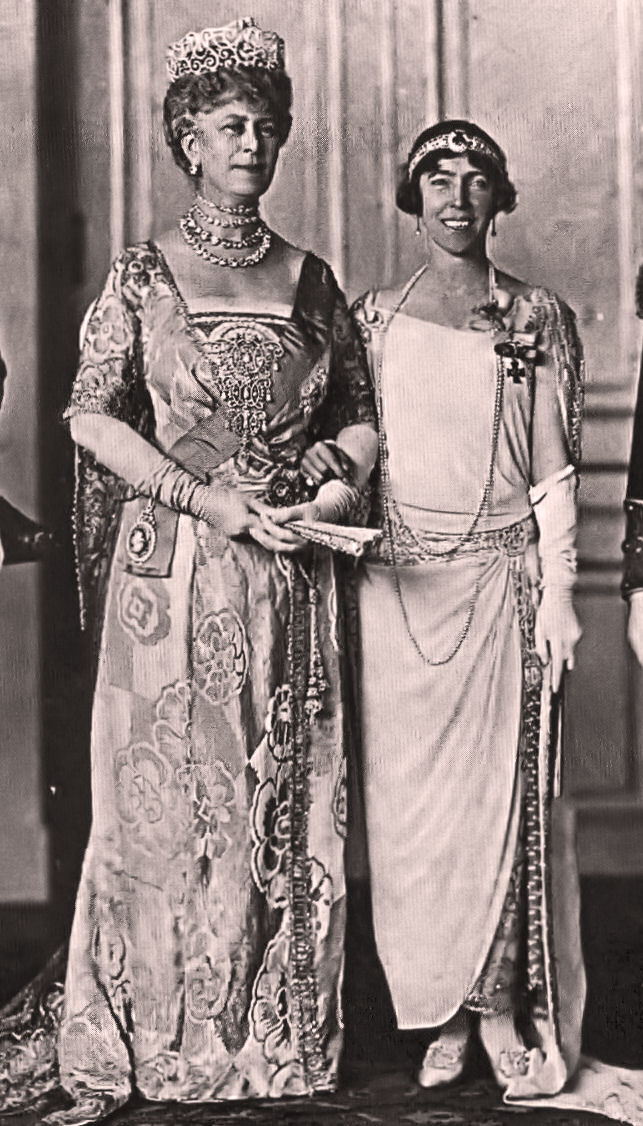
Queen Mary of the United Kingdom and Queen Elisabeth of Belgium wearing evening gloves at Belgian court.

An evening glove or opera glove is a type of glove that reaches beyond the elbow. They are traditionally worn by women on formal occasions.

Women's gloves for formal and semi-formal wear come in three lengths for women: wrist, elbow, and opera or full-length (over the elbow, usually reaching to the biceps but sometimes to the full length of the arm).

The most expensive full-length gloves are custom-made of kidskin. Many other types of leather, most usually soft varieties of cowhide, are used in making full-length gloves; patent leather and suede are especially popular as alternatives to kidskin, and are often more affordable than kidskin. Satin and stretch satin materials are extremely popular, and there are mass-produced varieties as well. More unusual glove materials include leathers made from salmon, python, and stingray.

== History ==
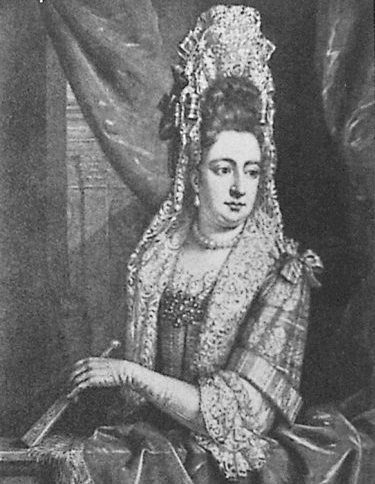
Mary II wearing elbow length gloves c. 1690

=== Western world ===
While the etymology of the term opera glove is unknown, gloves of above-the-elbow length have been worn since at least the late 18th century, and gloves reaching to or just below the elbow have been worn by women in Western countries since the 17th century; in an extant engraving of England's Queen Mary dating from the 1690s she is shown wearing elbow-length gloves. Over-the-elbow gloves were first widely popular during the Regency/Napoleonic period (circa 1800–1825), and waned in popularity during the early and mid-Victorian periods (circa 1830–1870), but enjoyed their greatest vogue in the last two decades of the 19th century and the years of the 20th century prior to the start of World War I. During that period, they were standard for both daytime and evening wear; even some swimming costumes were accessorized with opera gloves. Etiquette considered gloves to be mandatory accessories for both men and women of the upper classes, so it was uncommon to see a well-dressed woman at a public occasion who was not wearing gloves of some sort. According to several fashion historians, over-the-elbow gloves were re-popularized during the late 19th century by actresses Sarah Bernhardt in France (to disguise what she considered her overly thin arms) and Lillian Russell in the United States.

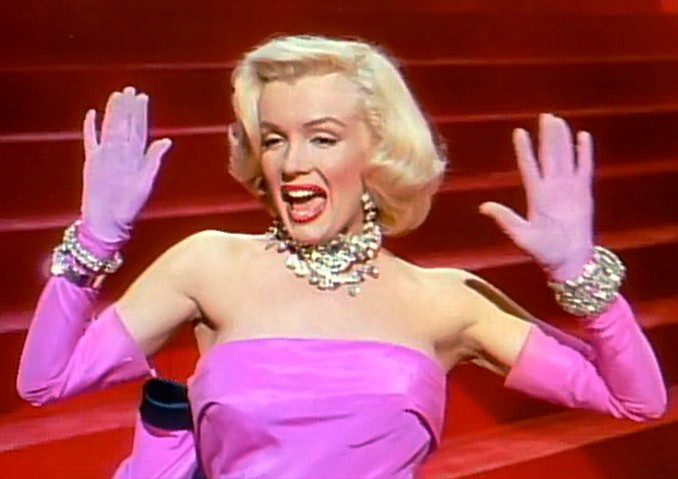
Marilyn Monroe wearing evening gloves in "Gentlemen Prefer Blondes"

The opera glove has enjoyed varying popularity in the decades since World War I, being most prevalent as a fashion accessory in the 1940s through the early 1960s, but continues to this day to be popular with women who want to add a particularly elegant touch to their formal attire. They have enjoyed minor revivals in fashion design on several occasions, being popular in haute couture collections in the late 2000s. Opera gloves of varying materials, particularly satin, lace, and kidskin, continue to be highly popular accessories for bridal, prom, debutante, and quinceañera gowns and at very formal ballroom dances (white opera gloves are still mandatory for female debutantes at the Vienna Opera Ball).

They are sometimes worn by entertainers such as can-can dancers and burlesque performers in particular during the performance of a Gown-and-glove striptease. In popular culture, probably the best-known images incorporating opera gloves are those of Rita Hayworth in Gilda (1946) Marilyn Monroe in Gentlemen Prefer Blondes (1953), Cinderella from Disney's 1950 film Cinderella and Audrey Hepburn in Breakfast at Tiffany's.

=== Japan ===
In Japan, some ladies wear long gloves all day in summer, to protect the ideal irojiro (色白), or fair skin, which represents beauty, grace, and high social status (as well as purity and divinity in local religions), and avoid any form of tanning.

== Gallery ==
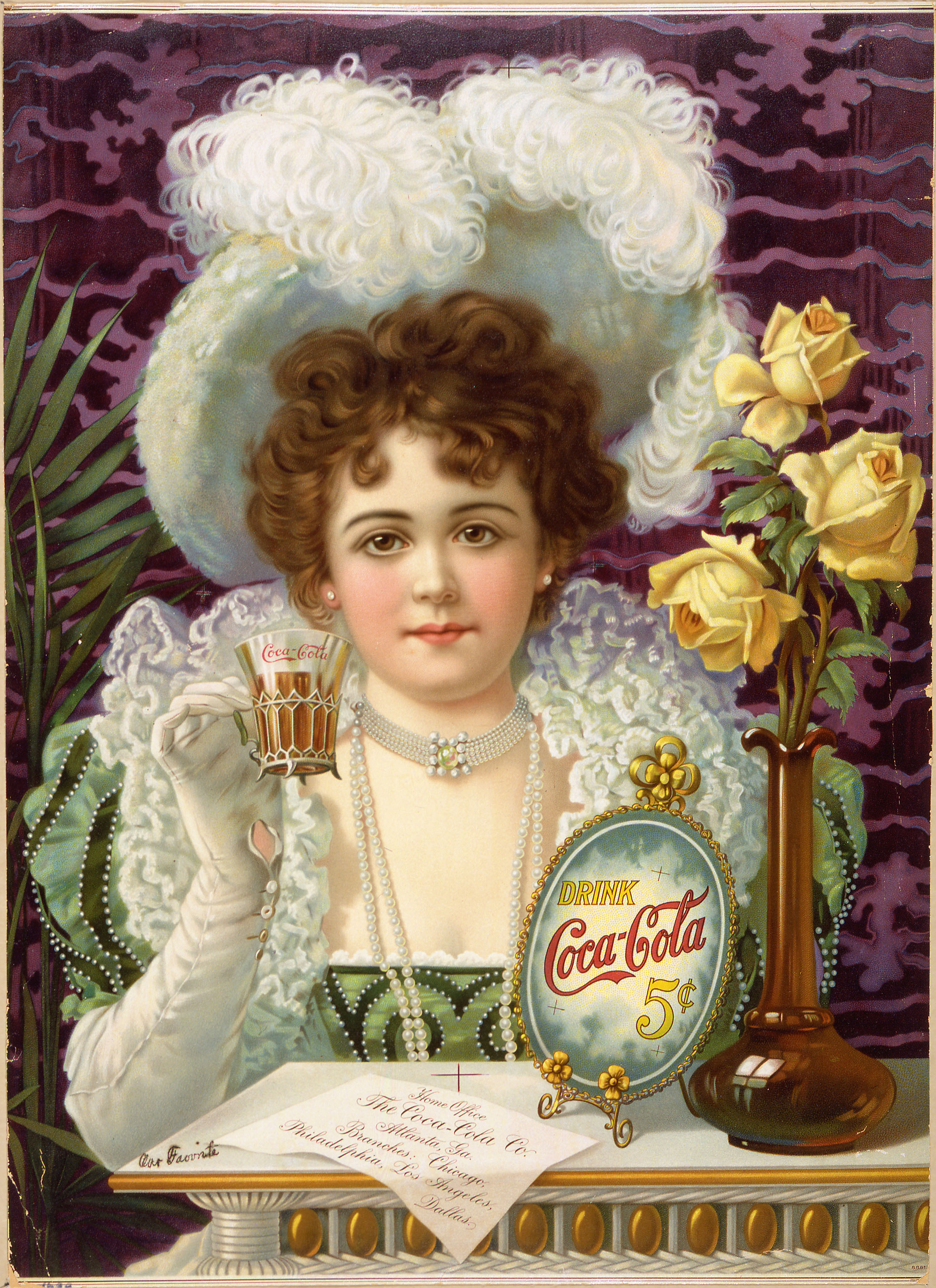
Coca Cola advertisement from c. 1900

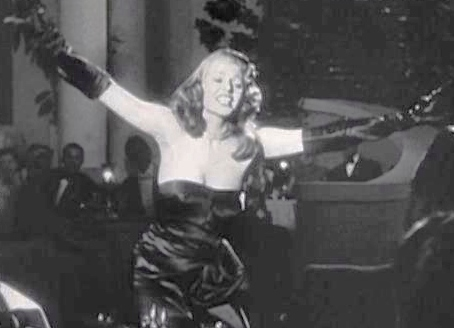
Rita Hayworth from the Gilda trailer in 1946

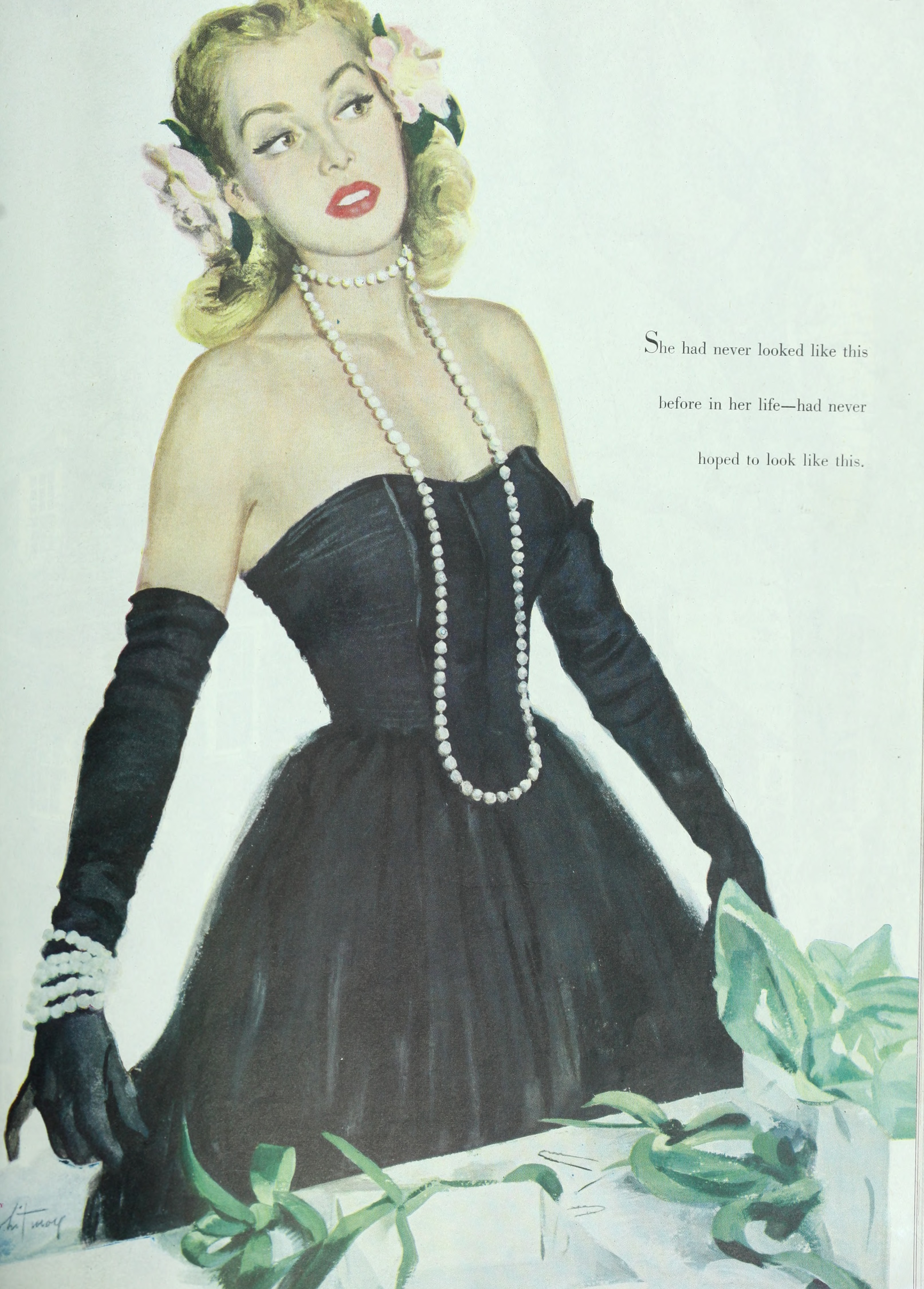
Ladies Home Journal, advertisement from 1948

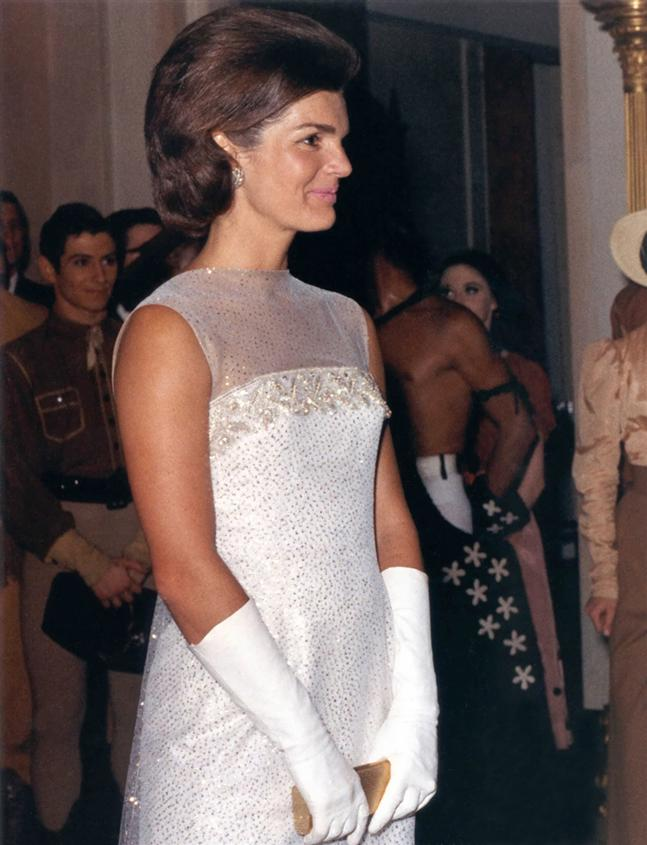
Jacqueline Kennedy wearing evening gloves at a state dinner in 1962.

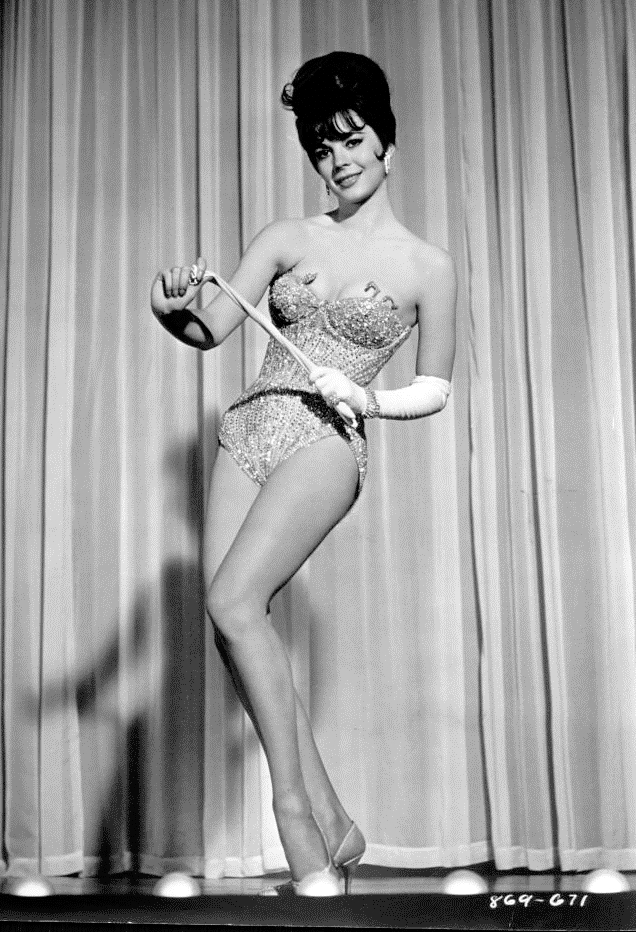
Natalie Wood portraying stripper Gypsy Rose Lee in 1962.

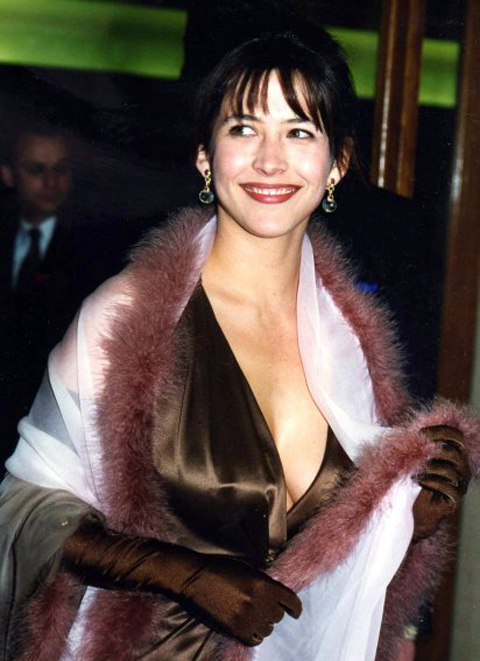
Actress Sophie Marceau wearing evening gloves, 1996.

== See also ==
- Gown-and-glove striptease
- Opera cloak
- Opera glasses
- Opera hat
