= Slouch sock =

Style of sock

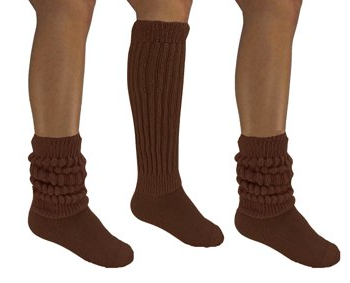
Slouch socks

Slouch socks, slouchy socks, loose socks or fall down socks are a type of sock featuring a heavy, non-elastic upper that may be pushed down into heavy folds around the ankles or pulled up to the knee. In Japan, the loose sock style has been popular with high-school girls. In the U.S., slouch socks have trended in and out of fashion since the 1980s.

== Description ==
Slouch socks come in two primary varieties. "Flat-knit" slouch socks have no elastic and have a "two-by-two" knitting pattern, creating a ribbed appearance by alternating 2 knit stitches and 2 purl stitches. The "flat-knit" term comes from the fact that the ribbing of the socks has a squared-off appearance. "Rib-knit" slouch socks are so-named because of their rounded ribbing. Most slouch socks, regardless of knitting style, tend to use very thin fabric around the foot to facilitate layering with other footwear.

== History ==
=== Japan ===
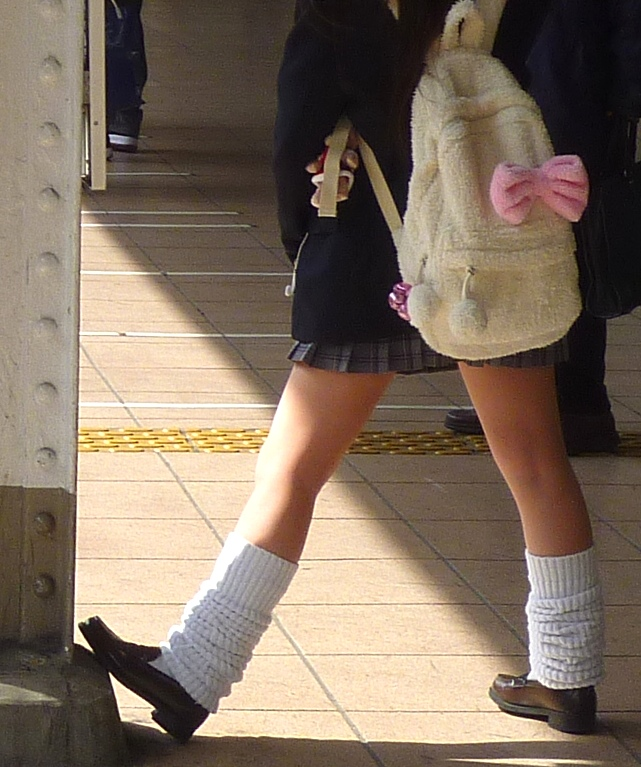
Loose socks in Japan

Loose socks (ルーズソックス, rūzu sokkusu) are a style of baggy sock worn by Japanese school girls as part of kogal culture. This style of socks has also become popular among American teens and college students who are fans of Japanese anime and manga. These socks come in a variety of styles, defined by the knitting pattern of the upper portion of the sock. The two most popular styles are the traditional 2×2 rib knit (pictured) and tube-style loose socks, which are thigh-high length tube socks worn pushed down around the ankles. A skin-safe body adhesive popularly known as "sock glue" can be used to affix the uppermost part of the sock to the calf so that the entire sock will not bunch downward and spoil the look.

Loose socks were adopted as a fashion which flattered plump calves and also expressed rebellious deviation from Japan's strict dress code for school uniforms. They have been used as an inspiration for photography by Akira Gomi. They are also used in Japanese street fashions such as kogal and fairy kei.

=== United States ===
In the U.S., slouch socks have trended in and out of fashion since the 1980s. From around 1984 to 1997, slouch socks were a popular fashion item for kids, youngsters and adults of all sexes.

The two most popular brands were Wigwam and E.G. Smith. Though JC Penney had their own version in white, red, and pastel blue, pastel yellow, pastel green, pastel pink, and peach colors shown worn alone or two colors at a time i.e. white pair with a pink pair.

Many women and girls wore black, lime green, blue, or other colored leggings with white slouch socks or pastel colored slouch socks, athletic sneakers and oversized and long to mid thigh length tee shirts, sweaters or sweatshirts as casual wear or exercise wear. Other colors like pastel yellow, blue or pink and black, red, purple and neon green were also seen. Many girls, teens, college girls, and women wore the slouch socks usually over leggings, cotton pants, or sweatpants, usually with Keds and oversized tee shirts, sweatshirts and sweaters sometimes with a turtleneck under the sweatshirt (popularly), or sweaters. Or they wore the slouch socks with babydoll or rah-rah skirts, above the short slip dresses, or Bermuda shorts with white Wigwam slouch socks or red slouch socks worn over opaque black tights with Keds. Also, the socks were worn with jeans or twill pants, especially "mom jeans" or other high-waisted styles for both sexes rolled or cuffed to show the socks, or worn over skinny jeans. Boat shoes, ankle flat boots and cross training sport sneakers were also worn with slouch socks. Many women and girls of all ages wore slouch socks as part of aerobic exercise wear or over sports leggings in colder weather for running, cross country and other sports. Cheerleaders wore slouch socks along with Keds as part of their uniform from the early to mid 1980s until the late '90s when slouch socks began to be replaced by crew or ankle socks.

Students who had a school uniform also wore the slouch socks with their skirts, shorts and pants and boat shoes or loafers. Usually in white or school color. Worn alone or over the school uniform opaque tights.

Boys and young men wore slouch socks with boat shoes, white Sperry canvas sneakers and cross training and other athletic sneakers with jeans or pants rolled or cuffed to show the socks and with casual or dress shorts, sweatpants or over sports leggings in colder weather for running, cross country, and other sports.
