= Nicole Abe =

Japanese gyaru fashion model

Nicole Abe 安部 ニコル
- Born: December 22, 1993 (age 32); Philippines
- Occupation: Fashion model
- Years active: 2008–present
- Modeling information
- Height: 1.61 m (5 ft 3 in)
- Website: ameblo.jp/nicorun

Nicole Abe (安部 ニコル, Abe Nikoru; born December 22, 1993) is a Japanese gyaru fashion model who has been featured in Ranzuki (2008–2011) and Happie Nuts (2011 onwards) gyaru fashion magazines. Abe was once a contributor to Ranzuki.

== Early life and education ==
Abe was born in the Philippines to a Filipino mother and Japanese father; she later obtained Japanese nationality through her father. Abe and her family had moved to Japan when she was five. She did not understand Japanese when she first arrived in Japan. While learning Japanese, she gradually forgot the fundamentals of English and Tagalog. Abe went to nursery school in Niigata Prefecture, and attended elementary school in Gunma Prefecture for the first two grades. She transferred to an elementary school in Chiba Prefecture before 4th grade.

== Modeling career ==
While studying in grade 3 at junior high school, Abe began her career in the gyaru magazine Ranzuki, debuting in the June 2008 issue. She was the youngest model to debut in Ranzuki. Abe worked with 16 publications in three and a half years, and became the most representative and influential model in Ranzuki. After Abe left Ranzuki in November 2011, she moved to the more popular gyaru magazine Happie Nuts, starting with the December issue. She appeared as a young queen in Happie Nuts.

Abe has been a representative for several gyaru fashion brands, such as Diamond Puff, Lis Liza Doll, a yukata brand Koibana. and a color contact lenses brand Candy Magic.
