= Ranzuki =

Japanese fashion magazine

- March 2011
- Categories: Fashion
- Frequency: Monthly
- Circulation: 230,000
- Publisher: Bunka-sha Publishing & Co
- First issue: June 1998
- Company: Bunka-sha
- Country: Japan
- Based in: Tokyo
- Language: Japanese

Ranzuki is a fashion magazine published monthly in Japan by Bunkasha Publishing & Co.. A gal magazine, Ranzuki mainly targets women in their teens and shows its preference for dark-skin and 109 items.

== History ==
Ranzuki was first published in June 1998 as a sister magazine of AsAyan magazine with the name ランキング大好き (Ranking Daisuki, lit. "I Love Ranking"). The magazine later became independent as of the September 2000 issue. In 2001, ランキング大好き changed its name and rebranded as Ranzuki. Ranzuki later spawned its special edition which became independent as JELLY in 2006.

== Model ==
Ranzuki features its regularly appearing models as "R's" and all of them usually appear on the magazine with their simple nicknames. The notable ones have included Yumi Yamanaka (Yumi-nyan), Aya Suzuki (Suzu), Takami Tsuha (Tah), Namino Hata (Nami-tee), Serika Nakayama (Serry), Yoko Kunieda (Yossan), Nicole Abe (Nikorun), Yui Minemura (Yuikichi or Yu-yu), Rika Mamiya (Rika-chu), Natsumi Saito (Natsuhmi), Arisa Kamada (Ari-chan), Rei Yasui (Rere).

Some of them have moved to the sister magazine JELLY, including Maya Mori, Naomi Arai, Yuki Yamamoto, Mai Miyagi, and Miho Ishigami. Some have moved to Vanilla Girl, a fashion magazine published by Bunka-sha the same publisher.

== External ==
- Official (in Japanese)
