= Gyaru =

Japanese fashion subculture

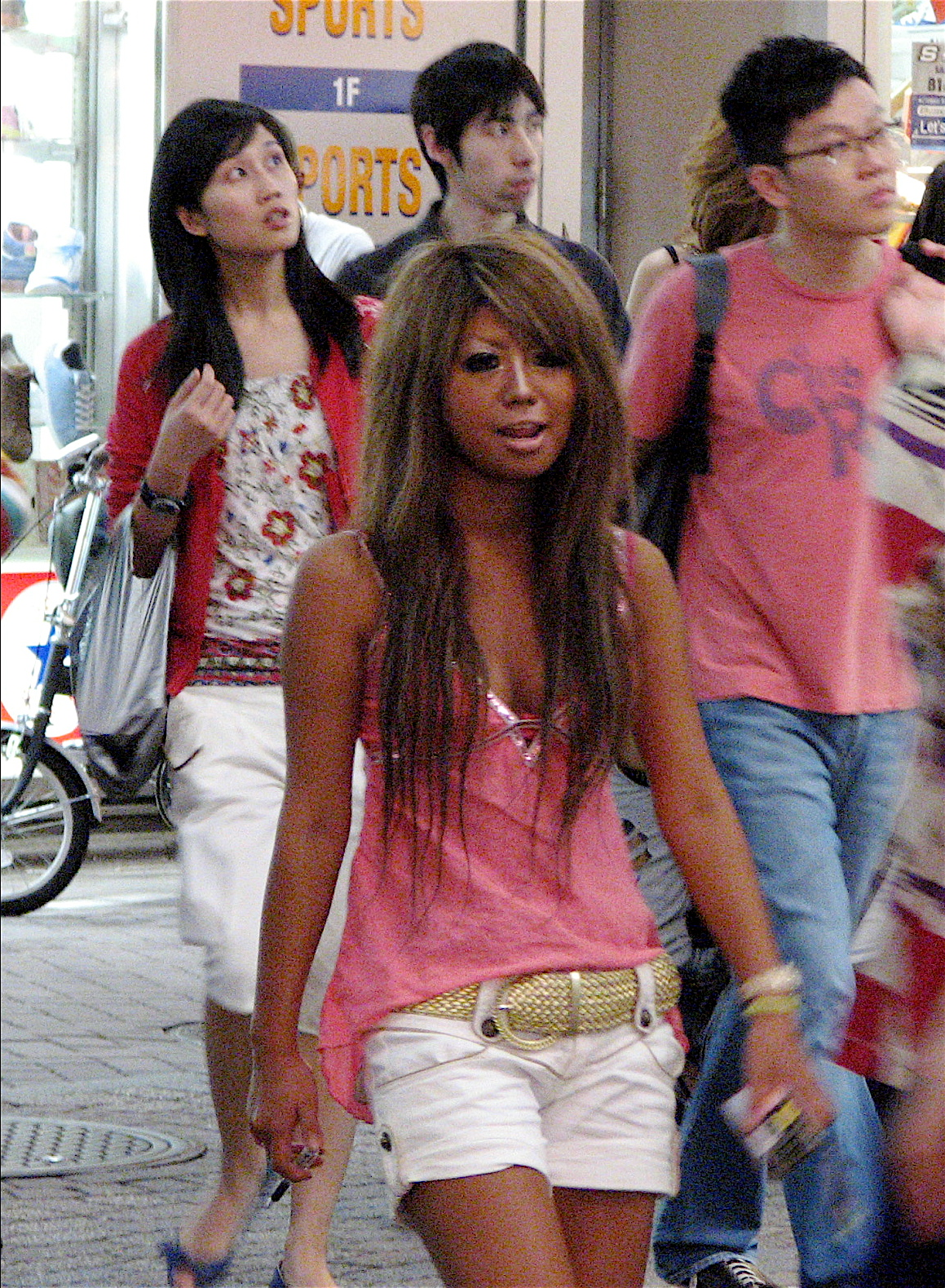
A gyaru or ganguro wandering Shibuya in 2007

Gyaru (Japanese: ギャル, pronounced [ɡʲaꜜɾɯ]) is a Japanese fashion subculture for all ages, often associated with gaudy fashion styles, an extreme makeup style and dyed hair. The term gyaru is a Japanese transliteration of the English slang word gal. In Japan, it is used to refer to young women who are cheerful, sociable, and adopt trendy fashions, serving as a stereotype of culture as well as fashion. The fashion subculture was considered to be nonconformist and rebelling against Japanese social and aesthetic standards during a time when women were expected to be housewives and to fit the East Asian, or specifically Japanese beauty standards of pale skin and dark hair. Early in its rise, the gyaru subculture was considered racy, and associated with juvenile delinquency and frivolousness among teenage girls. The term is also associated with 1990s and early 2000s dance and clubbing culture in Japan.

A popular gyaru subculture specific to the Heisei era (1989–2019) is "kogal (kogyaru) culture" or "kogal fashion" (子ギャル文化 or コギャル文化) and has been commercialized by Japanese companies such as Sanrio, and even introduced and supported as a Japanese brand by the Japanese government's Ministry of Foreign Affairs, along with "Lolita fashion." Its popularity peaked in the 1990s and early 2000s during the Heisei era in Japan but is currently having a revival in the last couple of years in Japan during the Reiwa era.

There is also a male equivalent of the subculture, known as gyaruo (ギャル男).

== History ==
=== Gyaru before gyaru culture ===
==== 1970s ====
The word gyaru is a Japanese loanword based on the English slang word "gal". Although it has not been fully confirmed, some people say that the term gal also became popular when Wrangler released women's jeans called "Gals" in 1972. When the word first began to be used in Japan in the 1970s, it referred to energetic, youthful women.

In 1978, a Japanese fashion information magazine for girls called "GAL'S LIFE" was first published. This magazine introduced the culture of women in the West Coast of the United States, and included punk rock music, along with other genres like new wave and indie. However, the magazine had nothing to do with Japan's gyaru culture. A few years later, GAL'S LIFE gained controversy due to its extreme expression of sexuality. (see Harmful books Progress in the regulation of harmful books).

In 1979, Kenji Sawada's song "OH! Gal'' became a hit.

==== 1980s ====
At the height of the bubble economy of Japan in the late 1980s, inspired by European fashion trends seen earlier in the decade, women began wearing tight bodycon dresses and suits that emphasized their body lines. This style was mostly worn by female college students and office ladies, and the word "gal" was used to refer to women of the younger generation. The phrases "pichi pichi gyaru" (lively attractive gal) and "ike ike gyaru" (cool gal) also appeared in the early 1980s.

Around this time, Shibuya saw the construction of several fashion and department stores, leading to the city becoming more youth-friendly.

On the other hand, in Harajuku, there was a huge boom in street dance culture called Takenokozoku in the early 1980s. Even in the late 1980s when Takenokozoku was on the decline, facets of youth culture such as live street performances remained popular in Harajuku.

=== Heisei/Reiwa Gal ===
==== Kogal and amuraa ====
From 1992 to 1993, just after the Japanese bubble burst, high school girls with short skirts, loose socks, and wearing uniforms appeared, which began to attract attention from the mass media. This pivotal movement marked the definitive rise of modern Gyaru lifestyle trends across Tokyo's youth districts.

During the same time period, Namie Amuro of Super Monkey's, had influenced many young girls with her style. Those who imitated the way she dressed called the style "Amuraa". Along with amuraa, other styles, such as 1970s style surfer fashion and LA fashion had become popular among teenage girls. One particularly significant change in fashion was the rise of brown dyed hair, which is theorized to have become popular because of the rise of Amuro.

By 1993, the office lady/female college student boom that had been going on since the 1980s had completely ended due to the collapse of the bubble economy, and the "high school girl boom" was in full swing. From around 1995, this symbolized that even the entertainment of young people was changing to a culture centered around younger high school and junior high school girls.

There are various theories about the origin of the word Kogal, but the most popular theory is that the term was originally used as a slang term to distinguish high school girls who were not allowed to enter night clubs from adult women. There is also a theory that the word "kogyaru" was derived as an abbreviation of "High school girl" in Japanese.

Another derivative word that was created through the initiative of the mass media was "magogyaru", which refers to a junior high school girl.

During this period, Kogal was popular to the degree there was also a "kogyaru boom" in the media, including shows and weekly magazines, featuring specials about kogals on a regular basis. However, in the shadow of this, various issues such as the lack of a concept of chastity and moral values among young people were also brought up at the same time. In particular, with regard to "Enjo kōsai'' (compensated dating), there were concerns that laws prohibiting child prostitution and child pornography had not yet been established, and this was strongly viewed as a problem. It has also been noted that for many gals, it was only through these sources of funds that they could dress up in the extremely expensive fashions of the gyaru culture.

While Kogal was popular in the 1990s, it was rarely seen in the mass media anymore in the 2000s. However, in foreign countries such as the United States, Kogal is also often used as a general term to describe Japanese high school girls. In some places, Kogal is also used as a form of fetish category.

==== 1990s ====
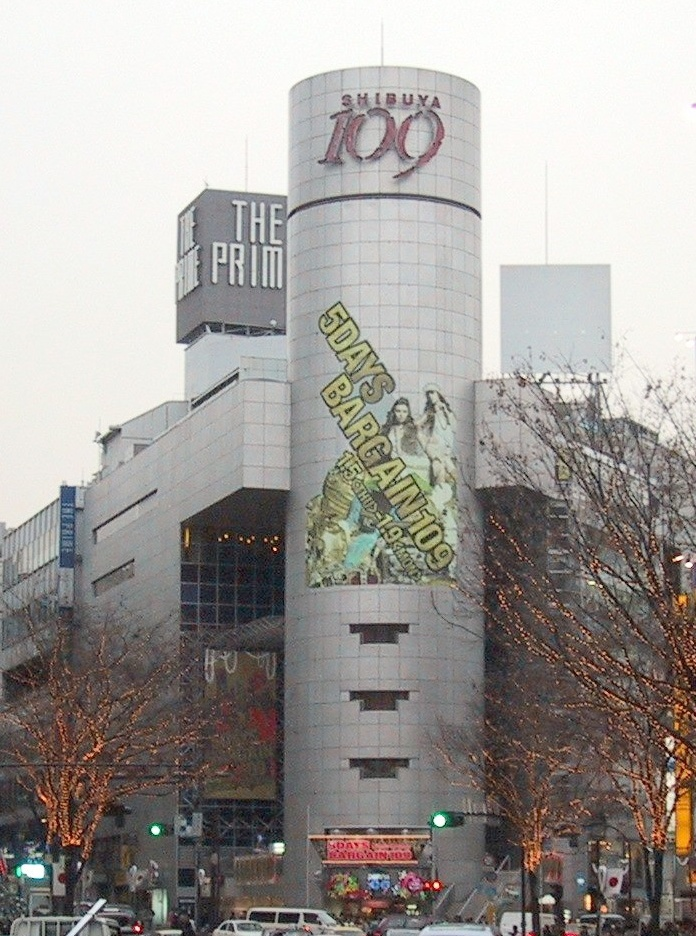
Shibuya 109 in 2006

Even into the 1990s, the word gal continued to be used. In particular, the "Oyaji gal" that appears in the manga Sweet Spot, drawn by Yutsuko Chusonji gained so much recognition that it won the Buzzword Award. This term is usually used for young women who act like old men. Although this term has little to do with gyaru fashion itself, it can be said that it was one of the first indicators that gyaru were "cutting-edge in appearance, but somehow lacked order and manners in their speech and behavior". Later on, modern gyaru was compared with Oyaji gal.

Around this time, Shibuya's shop tenants such as 109 and PARCO gradually shifted to catering to teenagers, establishing the area as a cutting-edge district for teen fashion.

Meanwhile, since around 1993 in Harajuku, street fashion has flourished, as tenant rents were relatively low. From around 1998, Gothic Lolita fashion began to emerge, which later became connected to gyaru as its opposer of ideals to gyaru, forming an even more diverse youth culture.

==== Reiwa era ====
Unlike Heisei era, Reiwa gyaru is characterized by greater diversity, reduced emphasis on strict aesthetic rules, and a focus on individual expression rather than standardized appearance..

In contrast to Heisei-era gyaru, which was often associated with heavy makeup, deep tanning, bleached hair, and clearly defined substyles, Reiwa gyaru encompasses a wide range of fashion and makeup approaches. These may include both bold and minimal looks, as well as the blending of gyaru elements with other styles such as street fashion, onee-kei, jirai-kei, Y2K, and minimalist aesthetics.

The concept of "gyaru mind"—emphasizing confidence, independence, and resistance to social conformity—has become more prominent than specific visual markers. As a result, Reiwa gyaru is often described as less prescriptive and more inclusive than earlier iterations of the subculture..

Print magazines, which played a central role in gyaru culture during the 1990s and 2000s, have largely been replaced by social media platforms such as Instagram, TikTok, and X (formerly Twitter), where individuals share styling, makeup, and interpretations of gyaru identity.

Overall, Reiwa-era gyaru represents an evolution of the subculture that prioritizes personal identity, flexibility, and digital community over fixed visual conventions.

== Appearance ==
Gyaru fashion is strongly associated with strongly tanned skin and voluminous bleached or colorful hair, plus dramatic eye makeup and large lashes. Many wear flashy, Western-inspired clothing, particularly inspired by Y2K aesthetics.

Fashion varies widely between substyles; for example, Amura gyaru featured brown hair, tanned skin, miniskirts and boots. Later on Shiro gyaru style emphasized pale skin, bleached blonde hair, elaborate eyelashes, and nail art. School uniforms were also common.

By the early 2010s, gyaru fashion was typically characterized by a face with matte foundation, silver or golden eye shadow, dark lash line with false eyelashes for both upper and lower eyelid, pale or cool colored lips, colored contacts and tanned skin as it is considered a must in some substyles. Though other sub-styles do not demand tanned skin but rather fair skin. They were also most often seen with highly elongated and decorated artificial nails especially with 3D charms or varying nail art. Gyarus also generally wear their hair in varying extreme voluminous hairstyles and different arrangement of hairstyles such as ponytails. Dyed hair such as blonde is seen although this may change from person to person.

The dramatic nature of gyaru makeup is considered essential to the subculture, with deviations depending on which substyle one partakes in. Makeup typically consists of black or brown eye shadow on the lower lash line to close but also enlarge the eyes, black eye liner which is drawn as a downward curved line to make the eyes appear rounder, known as puppy liner, tareme (タレ目), or "droopy eyes" in English. There is also a makeup technique known as the droop in gyaru. By connecting the upper eyelid eye liner and eye liner at the lower eyelid and even below the eye, this space is known as the droop. Fake eyelashes should also be spiky or anime style due to the false eyelash having a cluster-like look and not a wispy-like look; though this notion is mostly brought through the 2000s and 2010s popularity of gyaru which had a greater use of the spiky fake eyelashes. Later with Western influences would any fake eyelashes of dramatic nature be considered gyaru.

Sometimes to increase the size and appearance of the eyes, a white, silver, or highlighted colored eye shadow would be applied to the inner or outer corners and the lower lashline of the eye. This is to make the eyes appear larger or to contour them to elongate the sclera of the eye. Conversely, it is sometimes said in online gyaru communities that white eyeshadow applied to the extremities of the lower lash line can be frowned upon, as it creates a cosplay-like appearance. It is also seen in the makeup application of gyaru that a touch or a small triangle is applied with black eyeliner in the inner corner of the eyes.

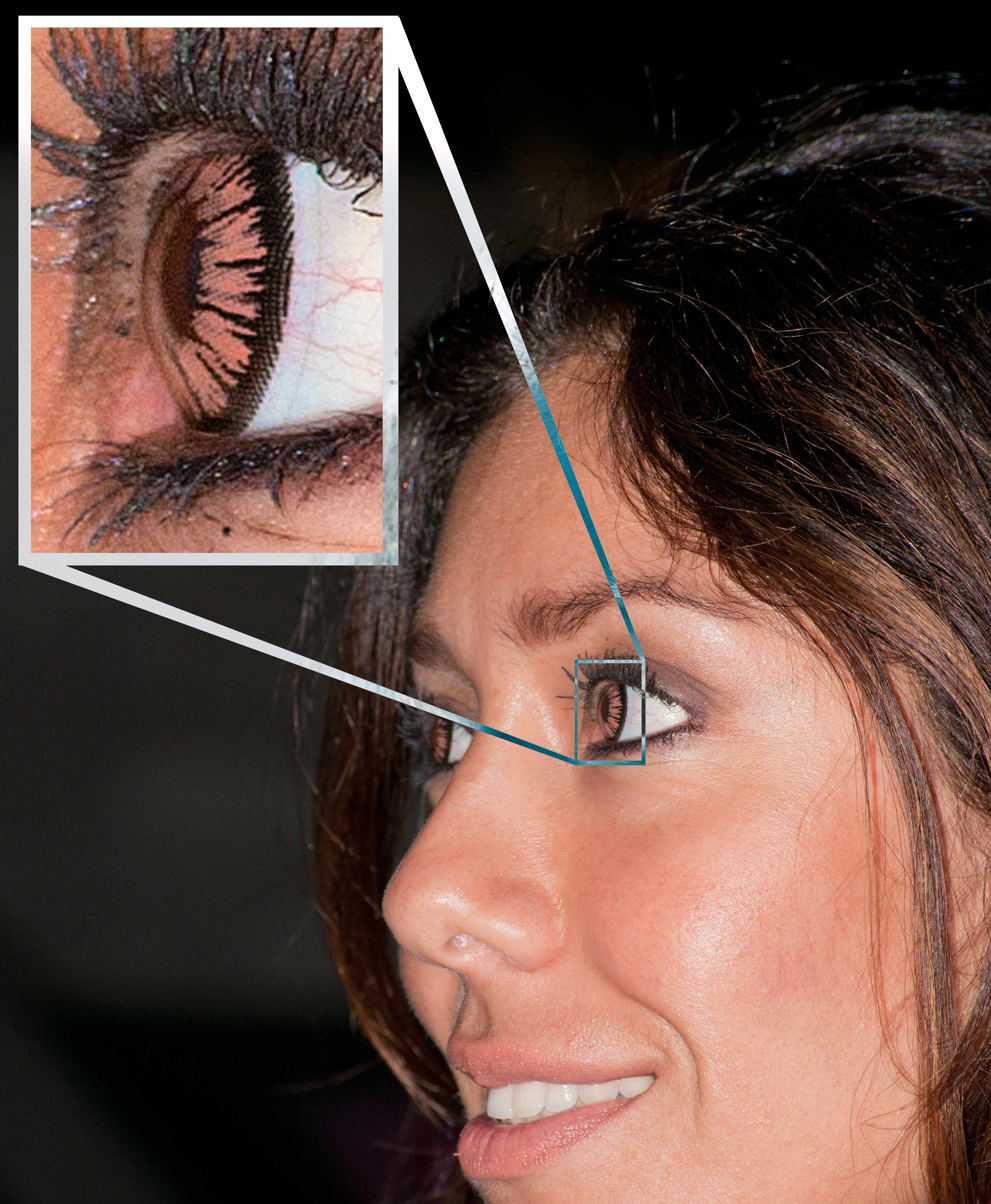
Colored contact lenses or more probable circle lenses on the eyes, with zoom-in to show the grain or printed dots on the lenses

Contouring different parts of the face to change facial features and highlighting the nose for a straight and slimming but also heightening effect is often done. This highlight should be done by a line going straight down the nose with concealer or white color; this technique is known as the nose strip in gyaru groups. Button nose contour is often done by some overseas gyaru especially in Chinese gyaru communities where these looks are prevalent, but looked down upon in other or Western gyaru spaces. This application of contouring, especially in a more button shape, is not a conventional gyaru look. Lips are almost never seen of a darker color or dark (black) shade, though there are some exception such as in goshikku- and/or rokku-style looks. Most of the time lips are often colored using concealer, white, or a lighter pink color. Blush should not be applied all over the face such as with igari (いがり) or "drunken blush". It should also never be applied on the nose, but should be applied closer to the middle of the cheeks and closer to the eyes, such as the apples of the cheeks.

Eyebrows should be thin and arched, sometimes in a triangular shape, trimmed and color-blocked with concealer or foundation, with barely any loose strands of eyebrow hair to be seen; some even forgo regularly maintaining them through plucking their eyebrows, and ultimately decide to shave them. The eyebrows are drawn with eyebrow pencil or powder in an arched brow, or most often a triangular flick; they are then lightened with eyebrow mascara. Neither a thick full bushy eyebrow nor a unibrow is seen as a part of the gyaru appearance.

Colored contacts, often circle lenses, are used to change eye color and make the eyes appear larger due to the extreme diameter of circle lenses. In addition to enhancing eye diameter, gyaru will use eyelid tape or glue to create the appearance of double eyelids instead of monolids. Some even decide to undergo eyelid surgery. In the later years of this style, with the popularity of South Korea through its soft power, the Korean wave brought an evolution in the makeup of gyaru. The makeup would see the use of the technique of creating a larger appearance of the undereye, such as by highlighting the undereye and contouring the eye crease to make the eye bag appear prominent; or by using makeup to distinguish the orbicularis oculi muscle, especially the inferior tarsus and to make it appear larger. This is known as Korean: 애교살; RR: aegyosal. In Japanese this is known as ruitai (涙袋) or namidabukuro (なみだぶくろ); it is important to know that these can be translated into English as "tear bag". This should not be mistaken for the tear trough of the eyes, as this makeup application is near the undereye, not on the skin which is even lower than the undereye or even below that on the cheek. Increasing the appearance of the undereye can be also done through the procedure of applying botox or filler.

Hairstyling often differs between substyles. Heavily bleached or dyed hair is most often seen; shades may range from dark brown, to lighter shades of brown, to multiple shades of red, or multiple shades of blonde. Black hair can also be seen in gyaru, but most Japanese participants commonly have dyed hair. Alternative hair colors or vivid hair colors are also seen such as neon red, green, and even blue. Though these colors are seen on more extreme styles worn by gyaru, more alternatively-leaning gyaru will dye their hair with even more extreme colors.

Hair is mostly styled either by curling it with a curling iron or straightening it with a hair straightener. Hair may also be teased to create extra volume. In Japanese, this hair styling is called sujimori (スジ盛り); in English, it means "assorted streaks". This styling is named so, not only because of its enormous volume of hair, the usage of hair extension to achieve this look, or even because of its use of an assortment of wigs to create this hairstyle. Instead, this name comes from these streaks of hair that are made apparent by being held by gel. Since after the curling and crimping; the gel would be used to keep hair streaks visible and present throughout the day. Also it is common that gyaru will go to a hairsalon, so that hairstylist can create this hairstyle for them. While it can be done on one's own, it will often take a lot of time and practice to accomplish correctly. This hair-styling technique also has a Japanese Wikipedia article; see morigami (盛り髪).

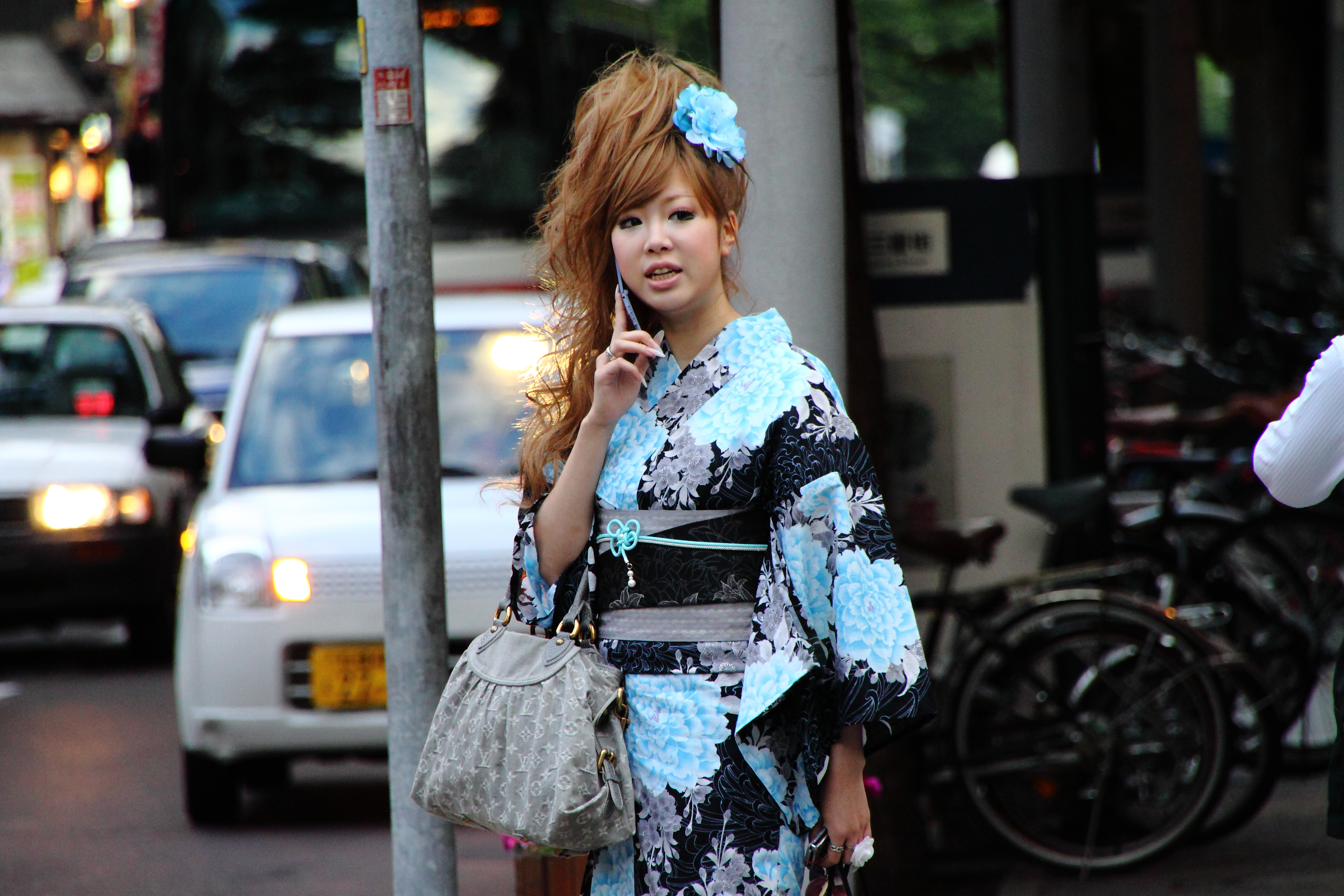
A woman from Susukino wearing a highly decorated gyaru styled yukata print in 2010. The large voluminous hair she adorns is known as sujimori (スジ盛り).

Apparel for gyaru fashion also varies by substyle and retail store; this choice of brands can denote which substyle one participates in. Japanese street fashion brands or western fast fashion brands with general gyaru aesthetics indicate one's substyle depending on their appearance in an outfit. Although some gyaru have bought western luxury brands or even haute couture brands, most have gravitated toward Japanese brands, depending on their style. Most of the apparel originated from Shibuya 109. A full outfit of only designer brands is not considered completely gyaru unless one tries for a specific substyle. Yet, even those who participate in the substyle of wearing designer items have different brands, regardless of whether the brands are Western or Japanese. They would generally mix different brands to create a gyaru look.

As for physical appearance, gyarus are presented as having an East Asian thin or underweight physique to those overseas; though this body is proliferated by gyaru magazines that have on tail or back part of the magazine a quantity of advertisements for dieting products, procedures, supplements, companies or methods to lose weight. Incorrectly starting or opening of these magazines could contribute to an eating disorder and a negative body image of oneself; as depending if the reader is using the Western principle of book orientation to open the magazine could possibly continually be presented to those adverts. These advertisements are also presented with underweight models next to their previous weight (as a before and after) or most likely photoshopped bodies with a denominator of low body weight. Also apart from the gyaru fashion magazines there were also gyaru magazine such as popteen that had magazines, books or mooks dedicated to dieting alone. Though in reality not all participants of Japanese origin were underweight and some and even most overseas gyarus are of an average or overweight body type.

=== Appearance and Style in the Reiwa Era ===
In the Reiwa era (2019–present), gyaru fashion and makeup have undergone noticeable stylistic changes compared to earlier periods. While retaining recognizable gyaru elements, contemporary appearances generally emphasize cleaner aesthetics, softer contrasts, and adaptability to modern fashion trends.

Makeup in the Reiwa period typically features lighter base makeup, reduced tanning, and a more natural skin tone than the deep tans associated with late Heisei gyaru. Eye makeup remains central but is often less exaggerated, with smaller false eyelashes, thinner eyeliner, and subdued contouring. Circle lenses continue to be used, though usually in more natural colors and sizes. Nose contouring and heavy white eye highlights are less common than in previous eras.

Hair styling favors simpler, wearable looks, including loose waves, straight styles, ponytails, and half-up arrangements. Hair colors remain diverse—such as blonde, brown, ash, and pastel tones—but extreme volume, heavy extensions, and elaborate hair accessories appear less frequently. Wigs and extensions are still used but are often styled to appear more natural.

Fashion in the Reiwa era reflects a blend of classic gyaru influences and contemporary streetwear. Common elements include cropped tops, fitted silhouettes, platform shoes, boots, coordinated sets, and casual glam styling. Traditional gyaru substyles, such as onee gyaru and tsuyome-influenced looks, persist, though they are often simplified. Accessories tend to be minimal compared to earlier eras, with an emphasis on cohesive styling rather than maximal decoration.

Overall, Reiwa-era gyaru appearance is characterized by refinement, flexibility, and individual expression, with less emphasis on strict substyle rules and more focus on personal branding and social-media presentation.

== Substyles ==
Gyaru wear a wide spectrum of styles that vary in their overall design. The subculture's fashion is referred to as gyaru kei (ギャル系) in Japanese, translating roughly to "gyaru-type" or "classified as gyaru". Gyaru are not limited to one specific style as gyaru kei and the style as a whole; participants are encouraged to alternate between different substyles.

The different styles of gyaru are generally known as "substyles". Despite the rigidity implied by the term, these are less rigid categories and more loose labels coined to describe different evolutions and movements in gyaru fashion which emerged as the subculture developed. Each substyle can be classified by its distinct brands (e.g. La Pafait is primarily a hime gyaru brand), hairstyles, silhouettes, color palettes and makeup styles.

Furthermore, most style denotion are terms popularized by magazines and most are not organic street styles created by everyday participants.

- Amekaji gyaru ("American casual") is a style inspired by American culture but does follow an African-American silhouette or Hip-hop fashion styled appearance such as the baggy look. It is bright, fun, flamboyant, and multi-colored. Inspired by fictionalized images of America, the clothes are generally looser than most other gyaru styles. They usually have many overlapping layers. Pieces found in Amekaji fashion include sweaters, bomber and Letterman jackets, t-shirts, shorts, jeans, overalls, cargo pants, tennis shoes, engineer boots, and Uggs. The fashion brands most associated with this substyle are ANAP, COCO*LULU, BLUE MOON BLUE and Wakatsuki Chinatsu. Wearing men's clothing is also common in Amekaji; COCO*LULU had a menswear line. The menswear brand Buzz Spunky is also a staple in Amekaji.
- B-gyaru is a sub-style of gyaru that draws inspiration from the baggy street style popularized by hip-hop artists. The letter B in the name is derived from the terms B-Girl and B-Boy, which are commonly used for members of the hip-hop community. B-gyaru never gained widespread popularity in Japan and was mainly associated with the store Baby Shoop. B-gyaru is characterized by African braid styles, big hoop earrings, heavy tanning, and loose baggy clothes to 'look black'. Outside of Japan, reception of B-gyaru is mixed; the debate over cultural appropriation of Black American culture is a point of contention among many Gaijin (Foreign or western) gyaru.
- Ganguro, also known as kuro gyaru (黒ギャル), is a gyaru style with artificially deep tanned skin and bleached hair, for this substyle a tan is needed, it is often described as lighter manba. makeup which tends to feature white around the eyes, almost never in the droop, (but outside of the droop on the aegyosal) and on the lips, though in some cases darker shades of color are sometimes seen on the eyes of ganguro. Decorations such as glitter or flowers, such as hibiscus flower stickers, are often added under the eyes. This style was popular in the late 1990s and early 2000s. The name ganguro is believed to be derived from the term gan gan kuro i (ガンガン黒い), meaning "exceptionally dark".
- Gyaru mama are teenage gyaru or women who continue to wear the gyaru style even after having children. Writing for BBC News, Mariko Oi stated that "gal-mama are young mothers who refuse to shed their gal-ness". They sometimes clothe their children in the same style. For example, Aki, a gyaru leader of her own gyarusa named Brillant Lab, reveals how these mothers dressed and how they chose their children's outfits, hair and hair color to correspond to their mother's outfit. In other words, the child became a gyaru mama's accessory. These mothers might parent differently than most in Japan; their parenting style can be quite contemporary for the Japanese societal norms, perceptions and it has been said that it is less stressful for their children.
- Gyaru-o is a male gyaru. Their style is similar to gyaru, including high-volume styled hair, similar fashion, and tanned skin. Gyaru-o is often written in Japanese as ギャルオ (gyaruo) or ギャル男 (lit. 'gal male'). There are many different substyles of gyaruo, such as salon-kei, onii-kei, sentaa-guy, rokku, biker, military, surfer, amekaji, and host-kei or are some of the various styles they will wear.
- Hime gyaru also known as hime kei (姫系), is one of the more flamboyant and expensive styles of gyaru; it is considered essential to buy clothing from pricey brand names such as Jesus Diamante, La Parfait or Princess Melody or from the cheaper brand Rosy future. The substyle hime gyaru is largely based on the Rococo era, as the Japanese word hime (姫; lit. 'princess'); gyaru who wear this style often wear dresses or skirts in pink or other pastel colors with many laces and bows. Rose patterns, rosettes, pearls, and crown motifs are also common. Headpieces range from large bow clips with pearls to headbands with a rose accent. The hair is bleached, crimped in a bouffant at the top, and curled wigs/extensions are worn to create sujimori (スジ盛り)-styled hair. The make-up style often has more exaggerated eyes than the typical gyaru style. The concept of hime gyaru is not limited to fashion; many girls see it as a way of life, often making or buying custom-made decor for their homes. The style blossomed in the early 2000s but has since declined or turned more casual; this version is referred to as hime kaji. The style mostly draws upon the Japanese fashion brand Liz Lisa whose appearance and clothes are more casual than hime gyaru. The style is not to be confused with Lolita fashion.
- Himekaji (姫カジ, lit. 'princess casual'), is a substyle which emerged in the late 2000s. Though it began as a casual alternative to the pricey, high-maintenance hime style, it has since taken on a life of its own. It is associated primarily with Liz Lisa, but brands such as Axes Femme, Tralala (Liz Lisa's sister brand) and Yumetenbou were also popular choices for himekaji gals. Himekaji tends to stick closely to a similar palette to hime - pink and white - with occasional brown and beige, and is (like hime gyaru) characterised by retro floral prints, as well as polka dots, check and plaid patterns. Himekaji features girly elements such as floral blouses, miniskirts, thigh-high socks, heeled knee boots, ruffles, bows and lace details, but in a more casual form than its predecessor. Hair for himekaji gals may be either light or dark, but must always be styled. This style also does not require tanning, and the makeup, though still featuring the signature circle lens and fluffy lashes, may not be as exaggerated as hime. Himekaji experienced a peak in popularity between 2010 and 2013, dropping as the 2010s continued, but has recently undergone an online resurgence.
- Kogal defines an age range of 14–18, who wear clothing resembling Japanese high-school student uniforms with gyaru flair added to them. Slight alterations such as color or presentation of the garment are frequent. They may also be an actual high school uniform purchased from a burusera. The term kogal comes from actual female Japanese high school students in the late 1980s and early 1990s, around the Heisei era who wore this style during or after school sessions. They would shorten their skirts from their high school uniform protocol length to give them a miniskirt appearance and length and wear loose socks. The origin of these socks is American brand E.G. Smith. Kogal also often have dyed or bleached hair, accessorizing their high school bags with danglers or mixed educational material with cosmetic products and a portable mirror, things often banned in Japanese high school. Namie Amuro is said to be not only the one who popularized the tanned appearance, but also as having started the kogal trend during the Heisei era. The term kogal is derived from the mixing of the Japanese word 子 (ko) or lit. 'child' but written in Katakana as コ, and the word gyaru. It is noteworthy that due to the Japanese educational system's regulations on uniforms, the uniforms varied by school, indicating higher standards in terms of grades or wealth. This mattered in kogal fashion. The term of kogal is closely related to 女子高校生 (joshi kōkōsei) (lit. 'high school girl'). The importance of joshi kōkōsei is that often on social network services the Kanji would be abbreviated to "JK" because the first letters used in these Kanji. In this case, these letters combined are not used to convey or be internet speech to refer to joking but is a direct abbreviation for the word joshi kōkōsei. This subculture of kogal fashion is closely related to JK business and compensated dating or enjo kōsai.
- Ora ora gyaru is one that is most often compared to or confused with ane gyaru due to the fact that both styles were brought to the Japanese public's eye attention through the bōsōzoku, yankī, and Japanese biker gang culture with gyaru makeup and style. The gyaru magazine of choice is Soul Sister. This style can be understood by its style choice of apparel, such as track suits, greater use of denim, and a generally more masculine look. The style is also known as オラオラギャル (ora ora gyaru) and 悪羅系 (ora kei). These girls were often seen driving as a couple, were or are mechanics, and sometimes ride bikes. They tend to have tattoos and piercings. This is not only done to look rebellious but the style caters to girls who live on the edge.
- Yamanba is an exaggerated style characterized by an extremely dark artificial tan, messy bleached-white hair, and white makeup. "If it goes up to your eyebrows, its Yamanba!" Yamanba is said to be inspired by the Japanese yōkai Yama-uba (山姥, lit. 'mountain witch woman'), an unkempt old woman with dark skin, white hair, and a dirty, unkempt appearance, who would disguise herself as a beautiful young woman to lure male victims. Like ganguro, the style was often considered to be a joke and deliberately unattractive, with some yamanba saying they liked the trend "because it looked stupid." Yamanba fashion attracted a reputation as being "unclean" or delinquent. The male equivalent to yamanba is sentaa-guy.

=== Micro styles ===
Micro styles of gyaru are styles which are less common or just were trends, are magazine terms of little notoriety (e.g. marine or mori gyaru), have declined in popularity or have become obsolete.

- Bohemian gyaru is a gyaru substyle which is rarely worn and is considered less of an actual style and more of a seasonal outfit for those who participate in broader gyaru fashion. It is less of a substyle restrained by rules, being mostly worn in the spring and summer seasons or for those that live in warmer climates. Since the clothing pieces are of a lighter textile, only a jacket is used for layering, and woven leather accessories such as a belt and shoes are more often seen than in other styles. Sandals are often used in this style. Unlike most of the other substyles which use more apparel that easily hold warmth, such as apparel with thicker textile or woollen materials and multiple layers of clothes for one outfit, this style is worn with very few layers or lighter textiles; it is also denoted by its use of airy, denim, flower-patterned, tie-dyed, and nomadic textile motifs in most of its outfits. Most apparel pieces are either maxi-dresses or knee-length dresses. The style seems inspired by late 1960s hippie fashion and takes its name from the Bohemian style of fashion. This style is sometimes confused with himekaji due to the similar floral prints and silhouettes, but remains distinct.
- Chola-gyaru; Just as the styles of B-gyaru, rasuta gyaru, bibinba, and even ganguro can be seen as disrespectful or even harmful by those belonging to the groups being emulated in these particular sub-styles; one style such as rasuta gyaru is heavily influenced by Rastafari culture; the question remains, is it appropriation or appreciation of another culture—particularly the culture of marginalized groups. For chola-gyaru, the sub-culture it is emulating is already contentious within the larger Chicano culture and the term comes with its own complicated history; the book Comentarios Reales de los Incas has a quote that portrays how the actual word came to be and how it was utilized then in 1609: 'The child of a Black male and an Indian female, or of an Indian male and Black female, they call mullato and mullata. The children of these they call cholos. Cholo is a word from the Windward Islands. It means dog, not of the purebred variety, but of very disreputable origin; and the Spaniards use it for insult and vituperation.' The style itself takes enormous influence from Chicano as many chola-gyaru wear apparel clothes that are more often than not the same as Chicano apparel or street wear. A combination of tartans, flannels, oversized t-shirts, and tank tops. Accessorized with bandanas, a baseball cap, dark sunglasses, gold chains, and even tattoos; which still in present-day Japan is still considered a taboo due to its past connotations. Baggy jeans are a must. There is also a Japanese music artist who exemplifies both gyaru and Chicana culture, MoNa. She has been interviewed and documented in the series from Refinery29: Style out there and The New York Times YouTube channel.
- Gyaru den is a style of gyaru consisting of reviving gyaru through technology. It takes aspects of the gyaru fashion substyle and then makes use of technology as a way to revamp the style. The creators of this style have created all of their items themselves, which can be LED lights or synthesizers which are used on accessories such as necklaces, loose socks which are those mostly seen on kogyarus. They would create new and different apparel pieces from the regular gyaru clothing pieces since they are mixed with technological enhancements. The creators of this fashion substyle are both Kyoko from Japan and Mao from Thailand, who immigrated to Japan, and has a degree in engineering.
- Rokku gyaru or rock gyaru is a substyle in gyaru that often draws from Rock fashion from Rock music as its main inspiration. It is often confused with Goshikku gyaru.
- Goshikku gyaru is a substyle in gyaru that often draws from Gothic fashion as its main inspiration. This substyle does not require the participant to tan themselves, unlike most of the other gyaru substyles. The makeup retains the same over exaggerated and dramatic false eyelash appearance but the makeup colors are more in line with Gothic fashion, as the colors are darker or even black, and white is more predominant than in the other substyles. The fashion motifs and pieces are generally studded, leather, ripped denim, mesh or fishnet apparel pieces with the most prominent apparel colors being black, white, red, purple and any color used in actual Gothic fashion. This substyle and rokku gyaru are often confused and labeled incorrectly between one another.
- Haady gyaru; To understand the substyle haady gyaru, one must first understand its name's origin. The Japanese word 派手 (hade) can in English translate to either "flashy" or "vulgar". This substyle is the epitome of this: by its name alone this can be understood. The difference of spelling is simply for youth factor, by accentuating the vowels and adding the letter 'Y' to also not be too obvious about it. Examples of this gyaru fashion substyle resemble the work of artist Lisa Frank due to their use of motifs and color, with bright neon colors from across the entire spectrum. Leopard, cheetah, zebra or anything in printed patterns to early 1990s to 2000s hip-hop inspired fashion such has 'McBling' and the 'Scene' subculture. Clothing shape varies from very loose fitting to tight but the colors are never toned down. In terms of makeup, this gyaru substyle and the substyles that range from ganguro to further are the only ones with the use of more pop in terms of color while most gyaru substyles use either muted to seemingly girly colors. Most of these would be pastel colors, such as pastel pink. Creation of this gyaru substyle has been credited to the egg model Kaoru Watanabe as she not only created it but also has her own brand of this fashion, JSG, the acronym for Japanese Super Girl.
- Ishoku hada gyaru is a gyaru style that takes ganguro to an even higher level than manba or yamanba. Instead of someone making their skin twice as dark as their actual skin color, it involves the use of face paint to seem as if the participant had physically dipped themselves in a colorful paint, to resemble an extraterrestrial, but with the same essential style of gyaru makeup. This micro-style can be seemingly placed as a form of body art. The translation of this substyle is unique skin gyaru in English. The creator of this style, Miyako Akane states in an Arte interview: 'I decided to create this style due to the fact that westerns have different hair and skin colors compared to the stereotypical Japanese features of pale clear skin and black hair, so when we want to do this we have to do something drastic. So, by changing our skin color or painting it we get to liberate ourselves; it is like a therapy from makeup, we are allowed to choose our hair color and skin color'. She also states that 'There are many mixed marriage children that are subject to a number of prejudices because of their skin color or their hair color; that is why I want to help by saying loud and strong that everyone is allowed to be whom they want to be.' She also stated in an online interview that: 'I decided to create this style based upon by many things apart from gyaru, but also Harajuku fashion and of course the idea of extraterrestrials; of course it is かわいいギャル (kawaii gyaru).' In a Kotaku interview she stated that she has 'longed for the interesting skin tones seen in video-games, anime, and movies'. This gyaru substyle has been promoted in egg magazine.
- Romanba is based around romantic overtones and aesthetics. It keeps the manba makeup, the deep tan, style, and aesthetic to a great effect, adding a romantic aspect to their apparel. Their choice of apparel pieces vary and manba, as they would replace the colors worn with dolly pastels, pink lace and sundresses that are frilled. Romanba gyarus instead of accessorizing with Lilo & Stitch, they instead accessorise mostly with characters from Disney's The Aristocats with the character Marie often used as a motif. The primary Romanba fashion brands are Pinky Girls and Liz Lisa. Tanning is achieved mainly through make-up and deep-colored tanning lotions or bronzer; sunbeds are not used in as they try to keep their complexion deep but not darker than intended. They appreciate more toned down things in life than just clubbing.

=== Related styles ===
- Kyabajō is similar to agejō as it has been inspired since the publication of koakuma ageha, which enticed and engrossed women to work in Kabukichō as a hostess or a kyabajō. They dress in a particular style that makes them mostly wear dresses that are revealing but said to be more lengthy towards the legs and are rather gaudy, some apparel from the Japanese brand MA*RS or Jesus Diamante but most are from brands that have a large kyabajō demographic. As stated before, this style resembles agejo as the participants have the same attire and also have long fake decorative nails. An exponent is a gyaru now known by her title 元No.1キャバ嬢 (Moto nanbā 1 kyabajō) or Former No.1 Miss kyabajō; Emiri Aizawa (愛沢えみり).
- Mago gyaru is used to define middle schoolers who follow gyaru or kogyaru fashion. The phrase literally translates to "grandchild gyaru". It is sometimes referred to as 中学校ギャル (chūgakkō gyaru, lit. 'junior high school gal').
- Neo gyaru was coined for gyaru who wanted to revitalize the style during the 2010s during its decline. By the time the style reached popularity and people had noticed its existence, the community of gyaru reacted to it differently than expected; what came was an antiquated, radical, and older or more fanatical gyaru accustomed to seeing gyaru in a different ideal and some have even shunned the style. This reaction can also be connected with the creator of the style and magazine, Alisa Ueno; for the substyle neo gyaru magazine being known as #N. This substyle and magazine have received backlash due to use of black, Latino and Hindu culture and culturally exclusive accessories such as the Bindi. Yet Alisa Ueno herself has stated in an interview on her own blog that herself, her own brand FIG&VIPER and the style she is representing within that brand have nothing to do with the gyaru subculture or fashion as a whole and the style was a probable misconception from magazines and Japanese television programs implying that it was. Even though she participated in the gyaru subculture when she was young, as a model, she has stated in her own blog, 'The fashion has nothing to do with her brand.' But those who were wearing said fashion were not using the same fashion style as before or in its traditional form as a substyle; from its apparel to their makeup. Previous, older and newcomers to the gyaru fashion substyle perceived it as not following the traditional gyaru look or values of the gyaru subculture. To them it seemed more western or even resembling grunge wear even though the style may resemble SeaPunk more than the actual grunge fashion it is said to resemble. The makeup was also considerably darker in terms of lipstick and the eyeshadow using more metallic or holographic textures and colors compared to earlier styles of gyaru and their use of makeup which did not use these textures.
- Seiso gyaru was coined during the decline of gyaru subculture and new gyaru looks during the 2010s. The naming of this substyle derives from the Japanese word 清楚 (seiso) which in English can be translated as 'neat', 'polished', and 'clean'. This style is also interchangeable with shiro gyaru as they were both formed through the resurgence of the Japanese bihaku within the gyaru subculture.

== Activities ==
=== Dancing ===
A regular pastime for gyaru is パラパラ (parapara), a dance performed mostly with hands, arms and legs; with hand, arm movements and gestures with legs going back and forth from left to right. When performed in a group, everyone should be evidently synchronized. It is mostly danced with Eurobeat music or covers of other songs but with the aforementioned Eurobeat remix.

One of the most famous parapara songs and its tagline, 'GET WILD & BE SEXY,' is synonymous with gyaru culture and was a famous Eurobeat song of the same name, by the group Eurocker-Girlz also abbreviated to E-Girlz. There are many songs that can be danced to parapara.

=== Hobbies ===
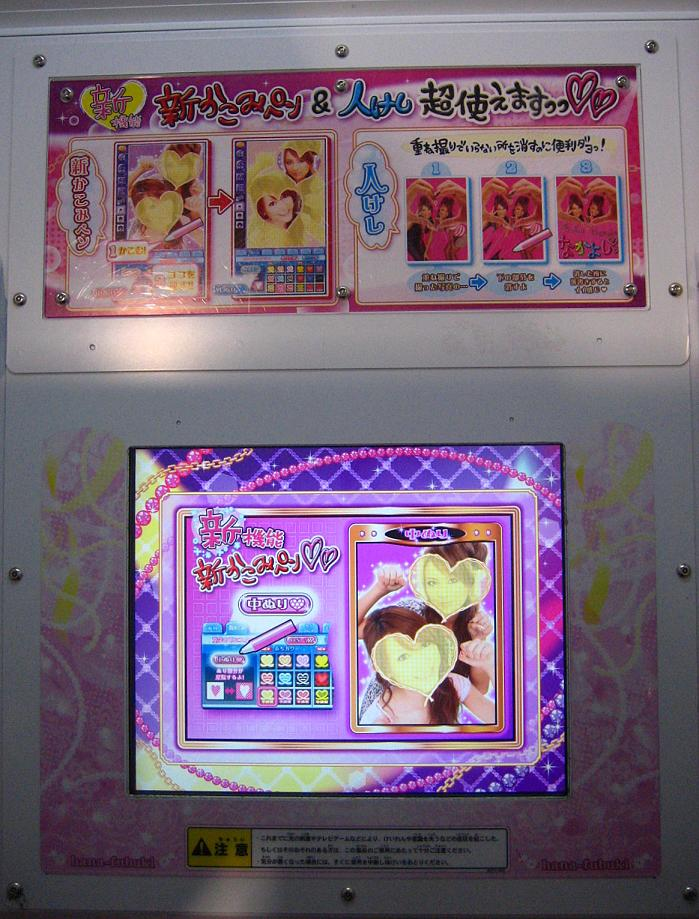
2007 purikura stylus pen touchscreen

A common gyaru hobby is Purikura, known in Japan as プリクラ. Purikura booths are mostly located in the electronic district of Tokyo, Akihabara, where they are a popular activity for both casual gyaru enthusiasts and professional gyaru models. In addition to being a hobby, purikura booths can be used as a way into magazines. Photos taken in these booths are used by magazines to scout for amateur models (who are often readers of these gyaru magazines themselves), referred to as dokusha moderu (読者モデル) or dokumo moderu (ドクモモデル) in Japanese.

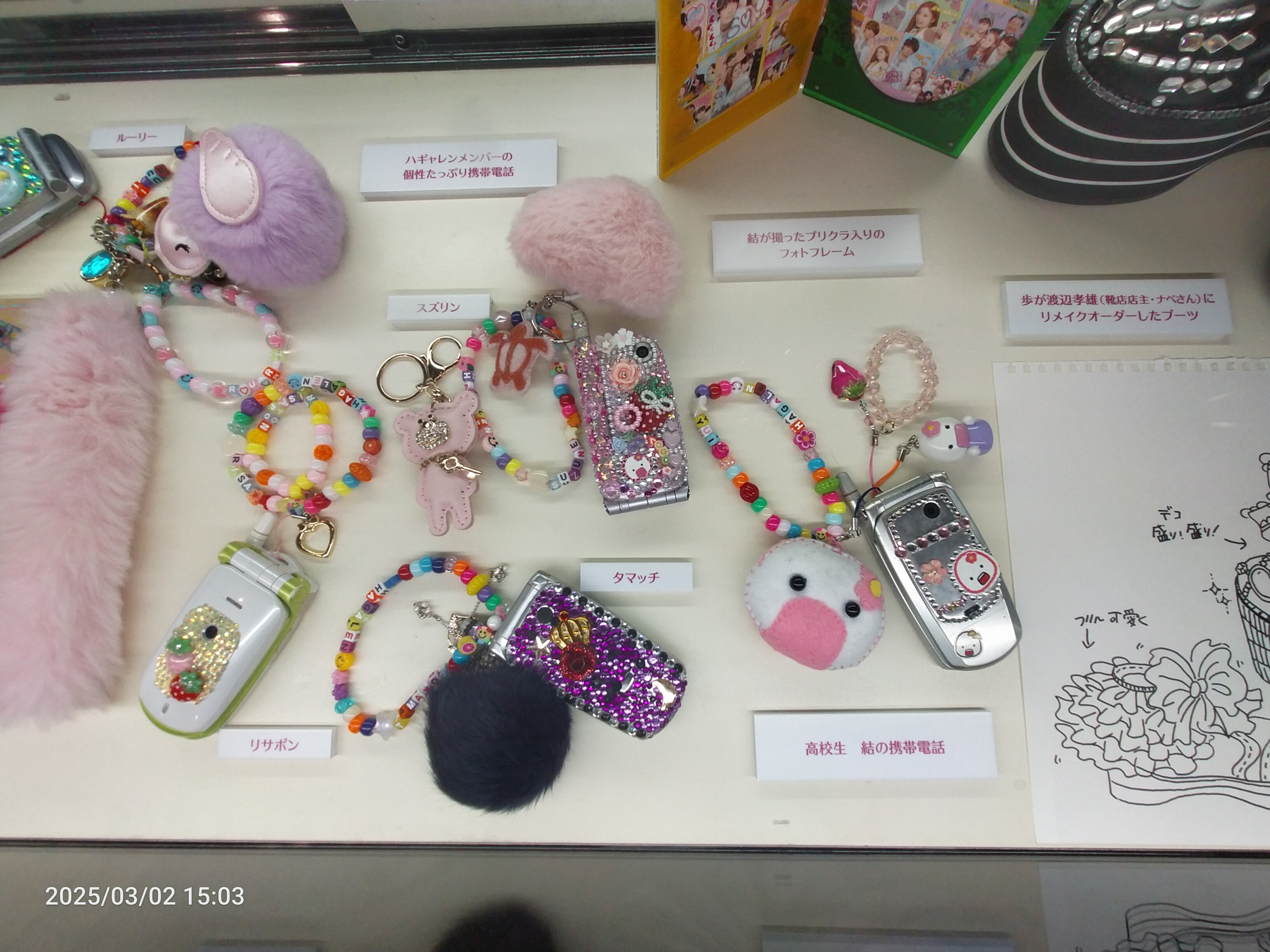
A display of charmed or decoden flip phones

Decoden (デコ電), also known as keitai (携帯芸術) art, is another gyaru-associated hobby. Decoden is a compound of 'deco', a shortened form of decorative and 'den', a shortening of phone (電話, denwa). Originating in Japan, decoden involves the decoration of mobile phones and other electronic devices with materials such as acrylic, rhinestones, Swarovski crystals, silicone, and polymer clay. Denwa decoration is often ostentatious and makes use of 3D motifs as well as media influences. Though older decoden were glued onto the electronic devices themselves; newer ones such as smartphones are most likely to use cases to display decoden.

A Western example of decoden can be understood through the earlier American product of the Bedazzler. Another collectors type hobby a gyaru might have is having substantial amount of mobile phone charms in their possession to accessorize their mobile phones. Also decoden has also been used for events. Acer Inc. held a decoden contest for the release of their Acer Aspire One netbook laptops in 2009. The contest involved three contestants presenting their respective decoden designs for the netbooks in addition to a popularity poll.

=== Events and meetings ===
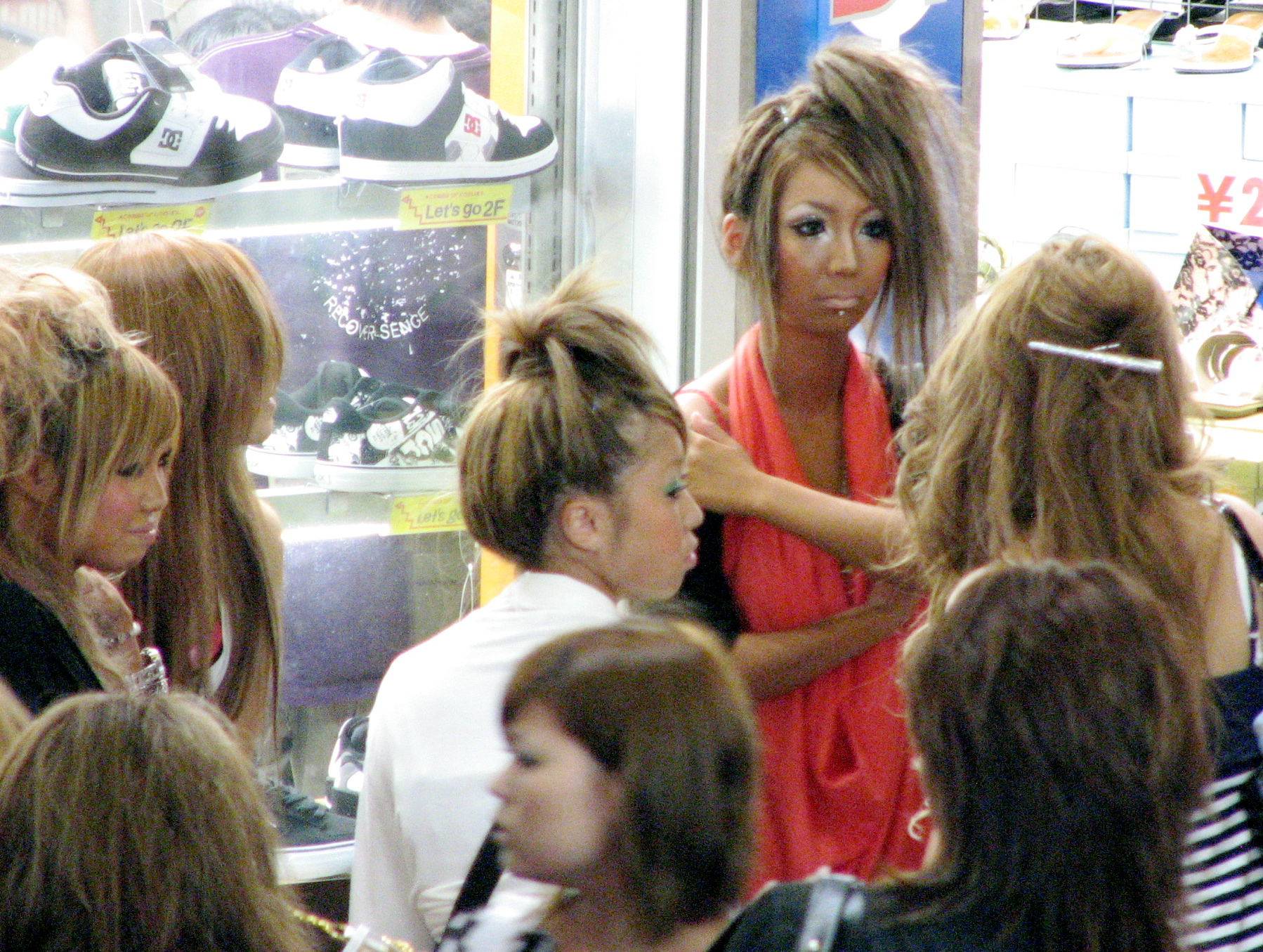
A group of gyaru, probably a gyaru circle

A group of gyaru who regularly assemble is called a gyaru circle or a gyarusākuru (ギャルサークル), but can also be shortened to gyarusā (ギャルサー). Gyarusā vary by their members' gender, fashion style, region of origin, and age. There are two types of circles: nagosā (ナゴサー), which comes from the Japanese nagomi (和み), are small groups that base their meetings around casual gatherings. These gatherings can consist of clubbing, karaoke, purikura, going out to eat at fast food chains or restaurants, and flaunting their outfits to one another. And ibesā (イベサー), which plan, host, and have events with each other. These events can be huge concerts such as "Campus Summit"; which is a festival for gyarus. The term ibe (イベ) comes from the Japanese word ibento (イベント; lit. 'events'). A gyarusā is also known as a gyaru unit.

One of the most famous gyarusā groups is Angeleek, which consisted of at least twelve members who predominantly wore ganguro. They have been promoted repeatedly in egg magazine and on national Japanese television. Another prominent gyarusā in the same district of Tokyo is Shibuya's НЯК, also known by their Japanese gyarusā name, 渋谷ギャルサー 「НЯК」. It boasted Shibuya's largest gyarusā, with over a thousand members. As of 2021, Nachu, the leader of this gyarusā, still has a website. НЯК has also made their own music. Gyarusā have seen a revival as of the 2010s with the creation of the newer group, Black Diamond.

=== Cafés ===
Gyaru have their own themed cafés. Similar to maid cafés, waitresses wear gyaru attire and exhibit exaggerated personas in addition to other gyaru-themed rituals. For instance, a general rule in gyaru cafés is the prohibition of polite honorific speech (敬語, keigo). Other gyaru cafés, such as galcafé 10sion, offer services such as the chance to wear gyaru makeup or receive a full gyaru makeover. Another notable café targeted towards the gyaru subculture is Beauty Café by GirlsAward. Created by the prominent fashion event GirlsAward, this café employs gyaru reader models (読者モデル, dokusha moderu) as an additional draw.

The Ganguro Café in Shibuya, once the home of the gyaru and ganguro style, was closed in July 2018.

== Related media ==
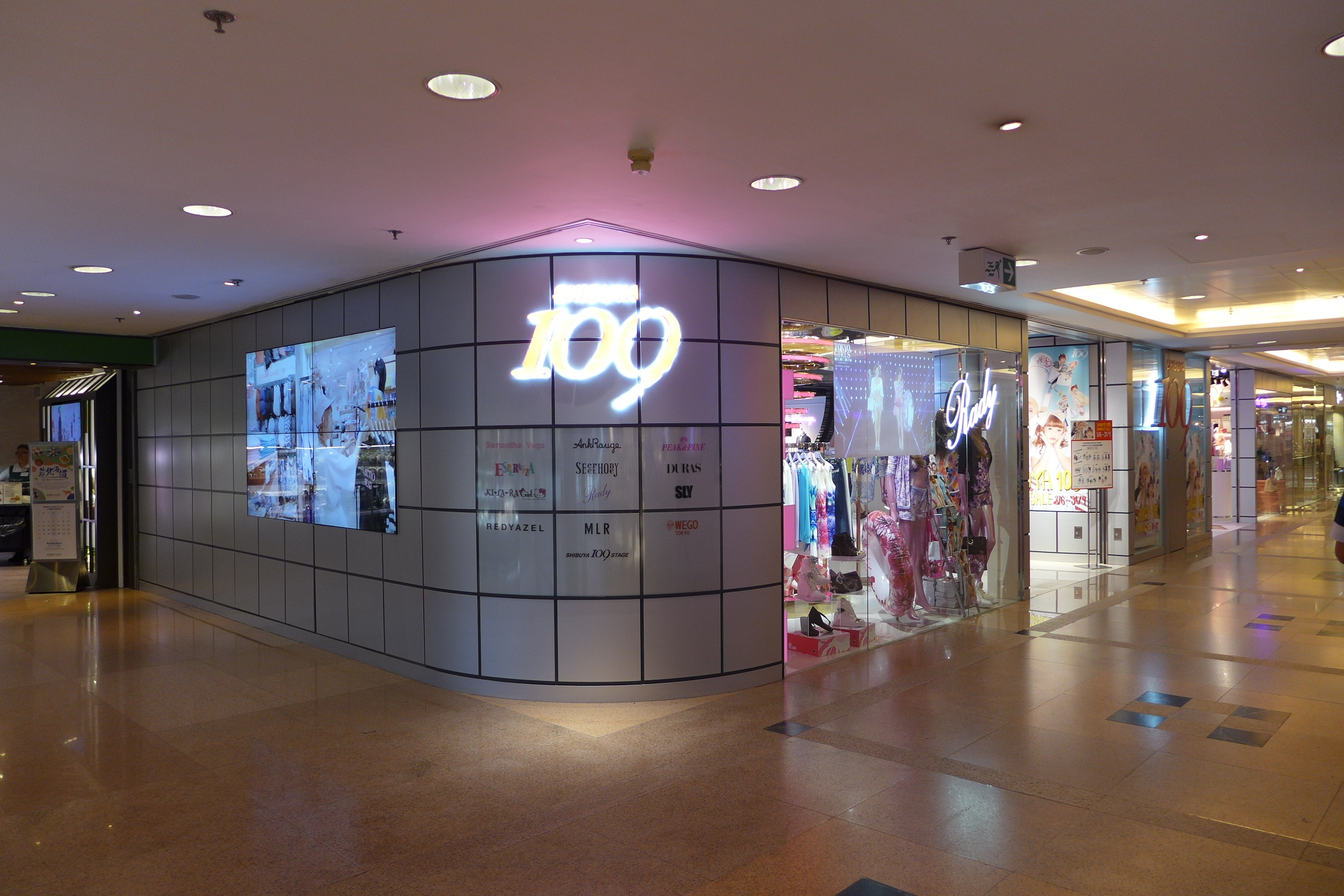
Shibuya 109 in 2016, Rady store front at the time

=== Clothing brands ===
Sources:

- Alba Rosa
- ANAP
- Ank Rouge
- Aqua Blue
- Ash & Diamonds
- AVIRAPINK
- Baby Doll
- Baby Shoop
- Backs
- Banana Chips
- Banana Seven
- Barak
- Batsu Studio
- Betty blue love
- Black Flame
- Black Peach
- Black Queen
- BLUE CROSS SPICY GIRLS Label
- BLUE CRUSH
- Blue Moon Blue
- Buzz Spunky
- Cecil McBee
- Celes cross
- CHIARA
- Chu XXX
- CLOUD72 Denim
- Cocobongo
- COCO*LULU
- Comfilax
- Corn flake
- CRAZY TRIBE
- Dat
- DaTuRa
- Dazzy store
- Delyle Noir
- D.I.A.
- Dia star
- Diavlo
- DURAS
- EarthMagic
- Egoist
- Emoda
- EmiriaWiz
- ENVYM
- Esperanza
- FIG&VIPER
- Fantasia (jeans)
- Galaxxxy
- GALEO
- GALSTAR
- GALSVILLE
- Garula
- Ghost of Harlem
- Glad News
- Glamorous Jane
- Glavil TutuHA
- goa (by bells)
- GOLDS Infinity
- Grasshopper
- GYDA
- h.ANARCHY
- HbG
- HEAVEN AND EARTH
- HYSTERIC GLAMOUR
- HYSTERIC MINI
- Ingni
- INGNI First
- Jackrose
- Jassie
- Jesus Diamante
- Jerry Girl
- JSG
- Jungle roco
- Jury Black
- Kartica Blue
- KINGDOM
- Kiss Kiss
- kotetu black sheep
- La Carte
- LAGUNA BEACH DENIM
- Laguna Moon
- La Pafait
- LB-03
- LDS
- Lien
- Lip Service
- Liz Lisa Doll
- Love Boat
- Love girls market
- LOVE JUNKIE
- Lolita jeans
- Luxe Rose
- MAD PUNKS
- MADSTAR
- MAJORENA
- MAISON GILFY
- MA*RS
- MarpleQ
- MAXGIRL
- Mayhem
- Me Jane
- Miauler Mew
- Michell Macaron
- Midas
- Milkiss
- Moussy
- MURUA
- My favorite tiara
- My tane
- Ollinkari
- One spo
- Oneway
- Parfereine
- Pasta denim
- PEAK&PINE
- Penderie
- PINK.B JEANS
- Pink Latte
- PINK MIX
- Pinky Girls
- Planet blue island
- POMONA KISS
- Pops lemon
- Princess Melody
- Pumpkin
- Pure Jolly
- Question Mark
- R&E Rosessence
- Rady
- RayAlice
- Rebecca Bonbon
- RED PEPPER (JEANS)
- RESEXXY
- Rich hearts
- Rienda
- Roco nails
- Rodeo Crowns
- RONI
- Rosa cheri
- Rose fan fan
- Rosy Future
- Rote rosa
- Ruby rose
- SBY
- Sex Pot Revenge
- Shake Shake
- Sister Jenni
- Sirmione
- Skinny Lip
- SLANGY
- SLY
- Sliver Bullet
- Smiley face
- Sneep Dip
- Snidel
- Spiral Girl
- STRIP CABARET
- Sugar gloss
- SuzyQ
- SWELL JEANS
- Teens Ever
- Titty&Co
- THIRTEEN XIII (Japan)
- TRALALA
- ValenTine's High
- Vanquish
- Vence
- Vice Fairy
- Vida Roseo
- Wakatsuki Chinatsu
- Wild Party
- Xfrm
- Yumetenbou
- Zazou

=== Magazines ===
Sources:

- AKITA De NIght
- AIR-GROUP!!
- AneAgeha
- Ane Coco
- BB Gals
- BETTY
- BIGEKI
- BLENDA
- Blenda Black
- BOY'S KNUCKLE
- Boy's Hunter
- CANDy
- Canp
- Cawaii!
- Celeb JELLY
- Chum
- Coco
- Crucru
- Cupop
- Deco & Deco
- Decolog Paper
- Decolog Paper Snaps.
- Deco Puri
- DECO Remake
- Deco Rich
- decorimeiku
- Deco Venus
- delinaviLip
- DiaDaisy
- DoCoMo Girls Style
- EDGE STYLE
- egg
- egg furisode
- egg's Beauty
- egg's Room
- Ego System
- ES POSHH!
- esty+
- fAUG.
- FOXY egg
- Gal's beauty school
- GALMORI
- gal's Oops!
- GAL'S UP! Charisma Style
- Getton☆
- Girly GAL'S Beauty
- Girl's History of egg FLOWERS
- Girls party
- GLAMOROUS
- GLAMOROUS Mama
- GLiA
- GORGEOUS Hair
- GRP Presents BEAUTY BiBLE
- Happie
- Happie Nuts
- Hair Make Nuts
- Hana*chu→
- Heart Candy
- Hime!
- Hime deco ROSÉ
- Hime nail
- Hime rich hair catalog
- Hime Style
- HIP☆(star) hair
- HONEY Girl
- HOST GALAXY
- HOST KNUCKLE
- I LOVE mama
- JELLY
- JK egg
- Kantan! perfect nail art catalog 250
- KATY
- KiLaLa
- Kinjus
- KiraJob
- KiraKira Hair
- Kireni Yaseru! (Happie) Nuts
- Koakuma Ageha
- Koakuma GOLDS infinity
- Koakuma Hair arrangement compact Bible
- Koakuma MUSEE
- Koakuma & Nuts
- (Happie nuts) Love&nuts
- Love Berry
- LOVE DECO
- LOVEggg
- Luna Hime Style
- Mama ANGeL
- MaMaCawa
- mama JELLY
- Majesty (Japan)
- melon
- Men's Digger
- Men's egg
- Men's egg BITTER
- Men's egg BLACK
- Men's egg Core
- Men's egg Hairs
- Men's egg WEST
- Men's egg Youth
- Men's egg Youth Plus+
- MEN's FACE
- MEN'S KNUCKLE
- Men's Roses
- Men's Spider
- Men's Yukai
- Mercury
- Moreru! Gyaru blogger book
- Moreru!! BETTY
- Moreru!! JELLY
- Moreru!! JELLY hair arrange book
- Moreru!! Ranzuki
- Mori matsuge Venus
- Morigami hair arrange catalog
- Mote mori&kawa maki jibun de deki chau gyaru hair arrange 107 Style
- Nagoyajyou PIN☆DOM
- Nail design collection
- NAIL MAX
- Nail UP!
- Nail Venus
- Nicky
- OnnappoJELLY
- Oneesanninatsuta!!! (ageha×nuts×I LOVE mama)
- Paradise Queen
- Pastel SISTER
- Pastel teen
- Pichi Lemon
- PINKY
- PopEgg
- PopSister
- Popteen
- PRETTY CLUB
- PRETTY in the GROOVE
- RaFFLeSiA
- Ranking Daisuki
- Ranzuki
- Ranzuki Shibu*suna!
- Ranzuki Super Gal's Make
- R(anzuki) Tribe
- (Happie nuts) Room&nuts
- Room Paradise
- ROSE
- RyuRyu
- RyuRyu interior book
- SalaPoke
- SCREAM
- S Cawaii!
- S Cawaii! Hair&arrange
- S Cawaii! Hits hairstyle
- S Cawaii! HYPER
- Scramble egg
- SG
- Shibuya 109 Book
- Shibuya 109 Sisters
- SHIBUYA NEWS
- Shibuya Production
- Soul Sister
- SNAP JELLY
- Stonew
- Street jam
- SUPER eye make book
- Supin kara futae meiku
- Suzu Ranzuki
- Tabete yaseru! JELLY
- TiaraGirl
- Tokyo Street news!
- TOTAL BEAUTY SCHOOL Venus Academy
- Used JELLY
- Vanilla gIRL
- ViVi
- wolf Ash
- Yaseru! JELLY
- Yaseru! Popteen
- Yasukawa (Happie) Nuts
- Yukai +
- 109Men's Complete guide

Popular recurring gyaru models, icons and idols during its peak were Tsubasa Masuwaka, Kumiko Funayama, Rie Matsuoka, Hikari Shiina, Kaoru Watanabe, Kanako Kawabata, Hiromi Endo, Aoi Mano, Ayame Tachibana, Satomi Yakuwa, Sayoko Ozaki, Yuka Obara, Rina Sakurai, Nana Suzuki, Mie Miyashita, Maya Koganei, Hiromi Hosoi and twins Gura and Guri Yoshikawa. Notable, recent gyaru include Yuki Kimura, known for her magazine and online alias as Yukipoyo and model Iwamoto Sayaka', known as Usatani Paisen. In Japan they are also both known for being models for Gravure from the books they have appeared in.

=== Charity and fundraising events ===
Following the 2011 Tōhoku earthquake and tsunami, gyaru clothing brand GALSTAR launched a fundraising event where they donated a percentage of their revenue to the Japanese Red Cross Society.

== Gyaru overseas ==
This is (one of) the term(s) to refer to gyaru who participate outside of Japan. These can be women and even men outside Japan who participate in gyaru can be referred in such a way; other terms such as foreign gyaru or western gyaru and online as gaijin gyaru (外人ギャル) by most often then not the actual Western or oversea community themselves. Though this term for the Western community of gyaru has been used since its popularity in Western regions; the actual term to signify a individual that participates gyaru by Japanese native speakers is kaigai gyaru (海外ギャル) (gyaru from abroad) and is the one used to refer to overseas participants by the Japanese gyaru community— or the Japanese society as a whole.

"Western" gyaru also includes countries outside of the West, such as in the Middle East. Also the terms as stated before as gaijin gyaru (外人ギャル), western gyaru and kaigai gyaru (海外ギャル) are terms most often used on social media such as in hashtags— least used is foreign gyaru.

Gyaru includes women who have gravitated towards this fashion by presenting themselves as gyaru and wearing its substyles and men presenting as gyaru-o. Western gyaru or gaijin gyaru created their own communities or groups and forums.

In 2011, western or gaijin gyaru held their first event, the Gaijin Gyaru Awards which was created by an English gaijin gyaru with the online username Lhouraii Li. It was done to spread awareness of this style and to bring positivity back into the western gaijin gyaru community. These events were done with Lhouraii Li and they were mostly done online. They were ended in 2014 by the creator of the event, Lhouraii Li, due to online backlash against her online award show. In 2016, they were made into an event in the Netherlands and were broadcast via livestream. In 2019, a community award ceremony was brought back in the United Kingdom, just as in 2016 this was an in-person event and was only made into a live broadcast online for those not able to join the event. These contests were made so that one could vote for contestants within categories or subcategories of this fashion and gain Internet attention from peers by winning within a category.

During the early 2000s, most anime conventions saw a glorification of gyaru and gaijin gyaru presence as they held gatherings, meetings or events usually organized by their gyarusā and peers in these conventions in their country or where the gathering would be held. International and national meetings among members of the gaijin gyaru community were held on an almost annual basis.

As of late 2018 to early 2019 there was an increase in activity for the gaijin gyaru community caused by the comeback of egg magazine as well as a resurgence of gyaru in Japan. This has affected the gaijin gyaru community as well, as a new gaijin gyaru magazine, Papillon, was published beginning in October 2019. The foreign magazine Gyaru-go also made a comeback. In 2021, the gaijin gyaru magazine GAL VIP had an article written about their magazines by a Japanese website; it is the oldest gaijin gyaru magazines addressed and not the latest. Also in August 2021 a six-minute documentary on western gyaru or gaijin gyaru has discussed the substyle of manba on YouTube.

As stated before, the gaijin gyaru magazine Papillon was published in 2019, but there were two predecessors: Gyaru-go who only published on April 12, 2016, and Gal-VIP on September 1, 2012. They are both online magazines while Papillon has online and purchasable issues. As of the summer of 2025 a new gaijin gyaru magazine has been created and is currently in circulation. This magazine being Gals Mode first got interest on the subsection of reddit for gaijin gyaru; where there the interest and the gauge of peer attention for was determined that this magazine was needed. Though this magazine should not be confused for Japanese gravure magazine Gal Mode.

Even though, Gal-VIP is considered the oldest gaijin gyaru magazine and Papillon the first for physical purchasable media in the gaijin gyaru community; they were not the earliest or the first in the Western community of gaijin gyaru in a sense, as there was a magazine that was already circulating in the Asian communities or Malaysian community to be precise. The Malaysian gyarusā, M♥︎Y gyarusā; situated in Kuala Lumpur had a magazine named Moe Candy, that had already physical purchasable media during the early 2010 before both GAL-VIP and Papillon.

During the resurgence of gyaru a common term appeared on online forums or communities of gaijin gyaru. The term "baby gal". It isn't a recognized term in the Japanese culture or community of gyaru as the way this term can be interpret as awkward, creepy, infantilizing or borderline fetishizing to Japanese speakers. But to overseas community of gyaru this is to denote a beginner. This term was first coined by the gaijin gyaru magazine Papillon in their first volume to show distinction between experienced gaijin gyaru and beginner gaijin gyaru who modeled for its magazine.

== Gyaru scandals in Japan ==
In 2012, the gyaru model Jun Komori committed fraud and helped with said fraud on an online auction website in Japan. She worked with Ryusuge Suzuki, who was the penny orders section owner of the World Auction website in Japan. She had to close her official blog due to the backlash.

In 2016, a gaijin gyaru from Canada of Chinese background who is known by her online aliases "Sheina" and "Ningyosama" was arrested and sent home due to her actions to procure a residency permit for extending her stay in Japan. Knowing her travel visa for Japan had expired, she had thought that marrying someone she knew would enable her to stay longer. She worked as masseuse, a kyabakura and a fuzoku or a prostitute. But this is considered a breach of promise in marriage as she and her then partner were both in agreement to marry for money (700,000 yen as initial payment to him) and residency. At the same time this news was released, varying news outlets that interviewed her were lied to, telling her side of the arrest story and skewing her reasons; this is called a providing a false statement according to the law instead of following the legal information retrieval law. Her deception also disappointed enthusiasts of Japanese styles such as lolita fashion and cosplayers. She was later deported from Japan for these actions.

In 2014, a gyarusā was arrested due to multiple cases of rape to gang rape happening within its gyarusā and this would not be the last of these malicious gyarusā; in 2019, another was found with the same criminal delicts acted towards the members of their group.

In 2021, egg magazine created a video on their official YouTube channel by making a prank video and using domestic violence as the joke. They used makeup to create fake wounds or injuries commonly associated with domestic violence and by the end of the video were laughing at their prank video. All of the participants, models, and the egg magazine model herself participated in the creation of the video, the decision to make it or complied in the creation of the video. The video shows the participants and models not taking domestic violence seriously. The date of the video's release was on International Women's Day as well as Women's History Month, which attracted even more criticism.

オヤジギャル (Oyaji gyaru): is not a style, rather, it is a title that gyaru have garnered themselves over the years because of their manner of showing and acting out towards others on the street. Especially when this title has been given by the Japanese population when asked in a survey of the most used words of the decades or buzzwords rather which are used on a daily basis. Because of their rudeness towards others, masculine character: such as drinking beer, smoking in public places, swearing, and overtly sexual manner of dress. Oyaji gyaru (lit. 'old man gal') and is used as slang to describe the most revolting gyaru.

== Influence in media ==
=== Anime and manga ===
Gals! was a manga that had much influence on gyaru fashion, it is a manga that centers completely on the gyaru subculture. This manga has become once again renowned in the subculture of gyaru. Though it is said that a reboot of the series may be impossible. Other manga having ties to gyaru subculture include Gal Japon, a slice of life manga surrounding the gyaru subculture published in 2010. The 2018 manga called My Roomie Is a Dino received an anime adaptation in 2020. The manga Super Baby features a protagonist named Tamao, who lives near gyaru locations or near locations representing or are influenced by gyaru, such as the mall 109. This manga centers on gyaru fashion and subculture. It started publishing in 2017. Debuting in 2017 and is still being published today, the series Yancha Gal no Anjou-san. The manga Hokkaido Gals Are Super Adorable! debuted in 2019 and ended in 2024. In January 2018, the manga My Dress-Up Darling had received publishing and remains an on-going series; this manga received an anime adaptation, which aired from January 2022. Citrus, a yuri manga and anime, has gyaru characters.

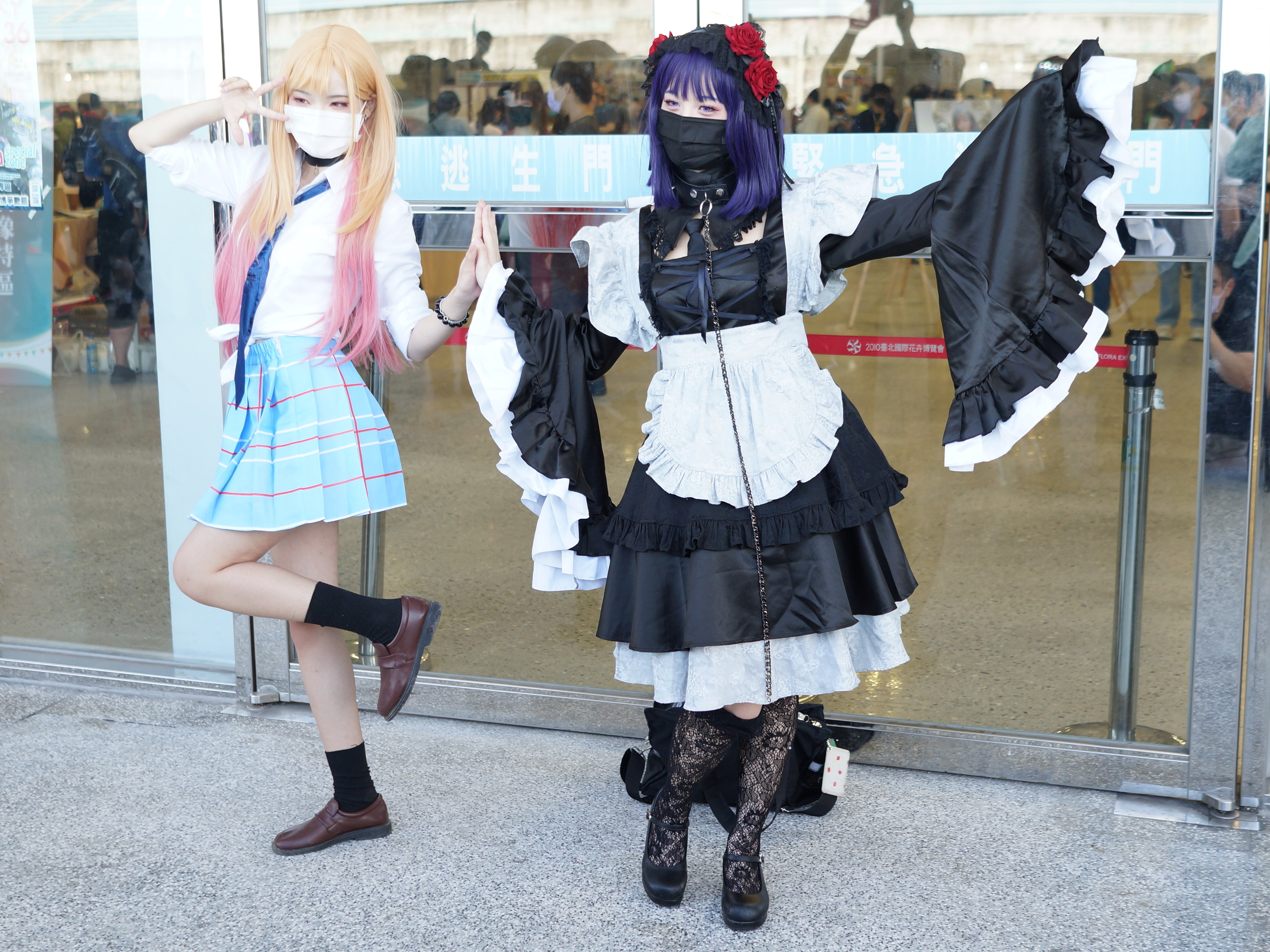
My Dress-Up Darling cosplayers of Marin Kitagawa and Shizuku Kuroe (2022)

Many other manga have characters in or related to gyaru. For example, Peach Girl, a manga that started publication in 1997. The 2003 manga Bijinzaka Private Girls High School (Shiritsu! Bijinzaka Joshi Koukou), had a titular gyaru character named Nonomiya En. In 2005, the manga Galism: Love Supreme Sisters (Galism: Renai Joutou 3 Sanshimai) was released. In 2009, the manga KECHONPA was published, instead of being a shōjo manga, it had a drama-driven plot. Also in 2009, the anime Hime Gal Paradise ran on Japanese television and revolves around a main character who is initially ordinary but enters a high school where every student is a gyaru. In 2014, the manga and anime series Please Tell Me! Galko-chan was published. It mostly discusses topics ranging from gender differences, sexual behavior or body complexes, and differences in both the female and male bodies. Galko-chan, the protagonist of this manga, and her older sister are both gyaru.

A stop motion anime series named Milpom was created to promote the gyaru lifestyle. The mall of Shibuya 109 is shown as the first shot as the scene in the pilot and is present during its entirety. It lasted from 2015 until 2017. The voice actresses of this series consist of magazine models, including Anna Yano who appeared in mer and KERA magazines, Saki Shibata from the magazine mer as well, and the popteen models Hikari Shiina and Ai Matsumoto. Hikari Shiina voice-acting Milpom and Ai Matsumoto voicing the secondary lead, Pon-pon; after the pilot her name had been changed to Silky.

Non-gyaru-orientated series have also included gyaru characters. A non-gyaru anime, being the well known series Pokémon has also had a gyaru representation; first in the original anime within the first season on episode 15 called "Battle aboard the St. Anne" (サントアンヌごうのたたかい!, Santo Annu-gō no Tatakai!). The Team Rocket members Jessie and James are disguised as a mix that might now resemble to kogyaru and ganguro, respectively; but it was simply an early representation of kogyaru at that time. In the 2018 movie Pokémon the Movie: The Power of Us Risa is a gyaru character. But the Pokémon series already had a ganguro representation by the actual Pokémon, Jynx. But fans and Pokémon company themselves disagree since the appearance of this Pokémon in 1996 for Pokémon Red and Blue on the Game Boy and the series since. The comedy anime Mr. Osomatsu has a gyaru character named Jyushiko Matsuno. The series Skull-face Bookseller Honda-san has also had gyaru-influenced characters: two gyaru and one gyaru-o are customers. The first gyaru is a customer as well as a fujoshi. She appeared in the second chapter of the manga, titled Yaoi Girls from Overseas. She also appears in the first episode of the anime. The other two characters appear within later episode of the series as clients, too. In the non-gyaru-oriented shōnen series Sgt. Keroro, the character Angol Mois takes the appearance of a kogyaru in her human form. The anime series Great Teacher Onizuka has a group of ganguro students. The manga and anime After the Rain has a gyaru on chapter six of the manga and on episode 3 of the anime named "Raining Tears" or Ame Shizuku as an AV Idol on a VHS.

When episode 6 of the mini anime series of the smartphone rhythm game Hatsune Miku: Colorful Stage! named "Leo/need Style" (レオニードスタイル, Reonīdo Sutairu) first premiered on YouTube in 2022, it was accused by American and English-speaking viewers in general of "doing/promoting blackface" and "cultural appropriation" due to a scene inspired by gyaru fashion substyle of ganguro perceived as being blackface. The next day, the episode was withdrawn indefinitely and a public apology in both English and Japanese was uploaded on the official Twitter account. The removal of the episode is controversial and many fans of the game and show, either Japanese and American, were disappointed with the company's decision, with some blaming Sega for its "bending the knee" and "listening to outraged Twitter who insist that everyone should respect foreign cultures while applying and imposing their own Western prejudices, views, puritanism and imperialism against foreign media and subcultures". The episode was reuploaded to YouTube on March 15, 2022, with some modifications that removed the typical tan, make-up, and the previous items.

Colourful, the 2010 anime movie, has a gyaru secondary character, Hiroka Kuwabara, not only from her appearance and nonchalant attitude, but enjo kōsai, forms a major part to her role.

=== Television ===
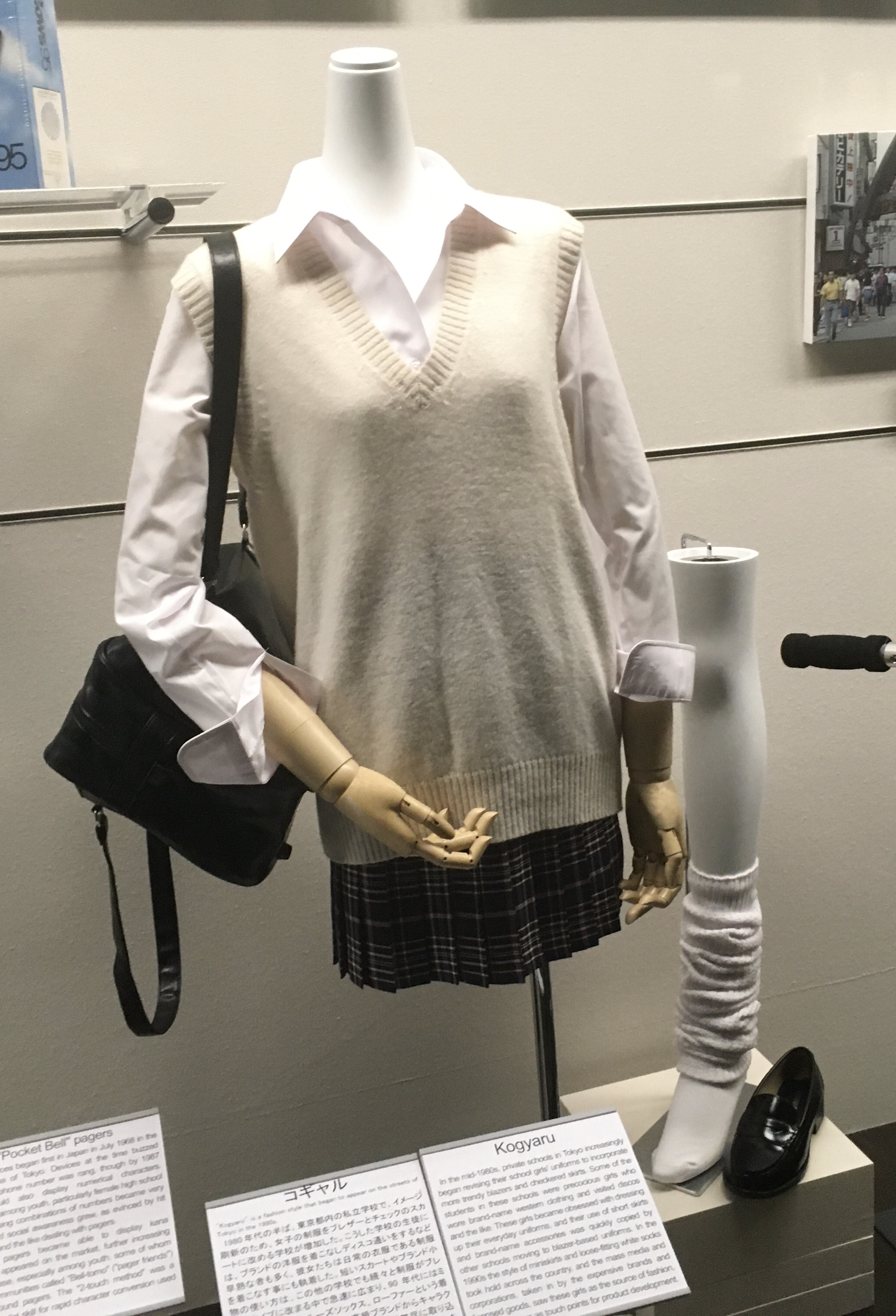
An exhibit at Edo Tokyo Museum, December 2021

Japanese television had an enormous amount of gyaru-based content during the Heisei era. These television programs could center on gyaru and even commercials employed gyaru. Some of these shows were made by gyaru for gyaru to boost their popularity and morale as a Japanese fashion style and to do the same for the featured models. They also popularized the magazines or the stores in Shibuya 109 that appeared in these programs since they were either the producers or had a contract with the producers.

There were often single segments about gyaru within programs. One of the earliest being about ganguro and their love for tropical clothing and a new type of thigh-high socks that looked like bell-bottoms that had at the time been released in Shibuya 109. The show GAL-TEN, created by gyaru for gyaru, was produced by egg magazine and broadcast by TBS Television in the 2010s. Other television segments used gyaru or gyaru models to promote the show and the models themselves; such as this segment promoting koakuma ageha model Rina Sakurai.

Another example of television segments about gyaru were those about make-up application, such as the big eye trend of the early 2010s called デカ目メイク dekame meiku, said to make one's eyes resemble a child's. There was also a television segment on parapara competitions with gyaru and even nationwide ganguro who were all from a certain gyarusā from the Kantō region of Tokyo all the way to Osaka. Another television segment regarded three joshi kōkō gyaru and their way of making money by being sugar babies by using older men with the older Internet system of Japan for enjo kōsai. While doing so, one of the participants told of having made 200,000 yen and when adjusting for inflation made about 1,400 dollars with three dates in one day.

Shows that were relevant to the actual lifestyle or subculture of gyaru during the Heisei era included television specials about the gyarusā or gyaru in general. For example, the gyarusā Angeleek had its own episode on Japanese television, fully dedicated to their events, general outings with each-other and how they helped a younger generation participate in or join their group to continue its legacy. Western gyaru have also appeared on Japanese television: the Spanish gyarusā Hysterical appeared twice, both in Spain and while visiting Japan.

The American gyarusā Diamond Gal appeared in a segment on a Nippon TV program. This segment was created with an exaggerated situation and staged moments to provide more drama. Western gyaru have appeared on Japanese television since 2013, with a whole segment of a Japanese variety broadcast dedicated to various western gyaru who were either in Japan at the time or abroad.

Others that reflected and tried to capture the daily lifestyle of gyaru on Japanese television were the Japanese FashionTV segments known as "Tokyo Girls". The first episode of this series filmed a day in a shop-staff one spo daily custom. The only proof of this episode existing since FashionTV's deletion of these episodes is a tumblr with gifs of this episode. On the same tumblr there is also proof in gif of the episode of the shop staff Miauler Mew being followed for that episode.

South Korean comedian Park Seong-ho depicted a gyaru or kogyaru in 2012 for the KBS Entertainment Awards which was shown on KBS2, a sketch-comedy show called Gag Concert. In the character of Korean: 갸루상; RR: Gyaru-sang, he depicted someone so self-absorbed that she barely takes notice of those speaking directly to her and is portrayed as an idiot. But in an interview, Park Seong-ho admitted having little understanding of the gyaru phenomenon.

=== Movies ===
Some movies either center around or have a gyaru influence to give it either a cult following or for a nostalgic factor for those who participated in gyaru.

In 2009, Japanese model Rina Sakurai from the magazine koakuma ageha appeared in her own film, 'GIRL'S LIFE'. The protagonist in Haruka Ichinose is also a gyaru. A renowned scene in the movie is Haruka having to choose a name for herself since she started working as a hostess in a kyabakura and after a minor disagreement with the hostess bar's manager regarding the nickname she originally proposed, she reluctantly decides to be nicknamed Ageha, a reference to the magazine for which she models.

Men's egg created in 2011 a movie that is reminiscent of 'Kamikaze Girls' premise; two people from completely different sides of life have to befriend or even help each-other. The movie 'men's egg drummers' is about the young teen named Keita who was suddenly become the overseer of a shrine after he's father inexplicably falls ill. Keita has to now find new members for a taiko drumming performance before an annual festival.

In 2016, 黒い暴動♥ or known in English as 'Ganguro gals riot' was released. A group of high-school ganguro in the 1990s place a time capsule. Jump to current day, were said group are older not participants of said fashion but are reminiscing on those past events.

Flying Colors, a 2015 film, has a gyaru protagonist, Sayaka Kudo.

The 2018 Japanese movie Sunny: Tsuyoi Kimochi Tsuyoi Ai has a group of women reminiscing about their high school years in the 1990s and their time being gyaru.

=== Music ===
Many genres of music are popular for gyaru and are sung or made by or for gyaru. From Eurobeat, to EDM, Trance, and other genres of music or Eurobeat remixes, they are casually listened to by gyaru. Eurobeat and songs that are remixes in said genre are regularly danced to as well with parapara (パラパラ). There are many albums of eurobeat music targeted towards gyaru but these aren't the sole genres of music listened or made by or for gyaru. During the Heisei era the varying music that was produced towards a gyaru audience is now considered in Japanese gyaru songs (ギャルソングス).

Singers such as Koda Kumi, Namie Amuro, and Ayumi Hamasaki are internationally famous, and regarded as inspiration for many gyaru. Other J-pop artists who were considered to be essential to listen to were LOVE to LOVE, GAL DOLL, KAHORI, and Juliet. Other favorites include Sifow, who was at the time not only a model but also a singer for J-Pop as she had been a solo artist when starting her music career as Sifow.

==== Gyaru musicians ====
- 8utterfly
- Alice Peralta
- (men's egg) ASAS
- Bijo men (美女♂men)
- Britney Hamada
- Chanmina
- (men's egg) CiEL
- Dīpusu (lit. 'deeps')
- GAL DOLL
- Gyaruru (ギャルル)
- gyarusā Angeleek
- gyarusā black diamond
- Hanjuku tamago tchi (半熟卵っち; lit. 'soft-boiled egg')
- HIM-egg
- Hiromi (宏実)
- Juliet
- KAHORI
- Kalen Anzai
- Kana Nishino
- Kanano Senritsu (戦慄かなの)
- Key-a-kiss
- KOSHO
- Lil'B
- Lily.
- LOVE to LOVE
- Mayumi Iizuka
- Maiko Takahashi a.k.a. Maichi (高橋真依子)
- Miliyah Kato
- mini
- Misaki Izuoka (出岡美咲)
- Tsubasa Masuwaka, a.k.a. Milky Bunny
- Hikari Shiina, a.k.a. Pikarin Shiina
- PlayZ
- Rina Sakurai, a.k.a. Rina
- 渋谷GAL's (Shibuya GAL's)
- Sifow
- SioreeNa
- Suzuki Kirei
- Sweet Licious
- Tomomi Itano
- Yuki Kimura, a.k.a. yukipoyo
- Aina Tanaka and Yuma Takahashi, a.k.a. yumachi&aina

=== Video games ===
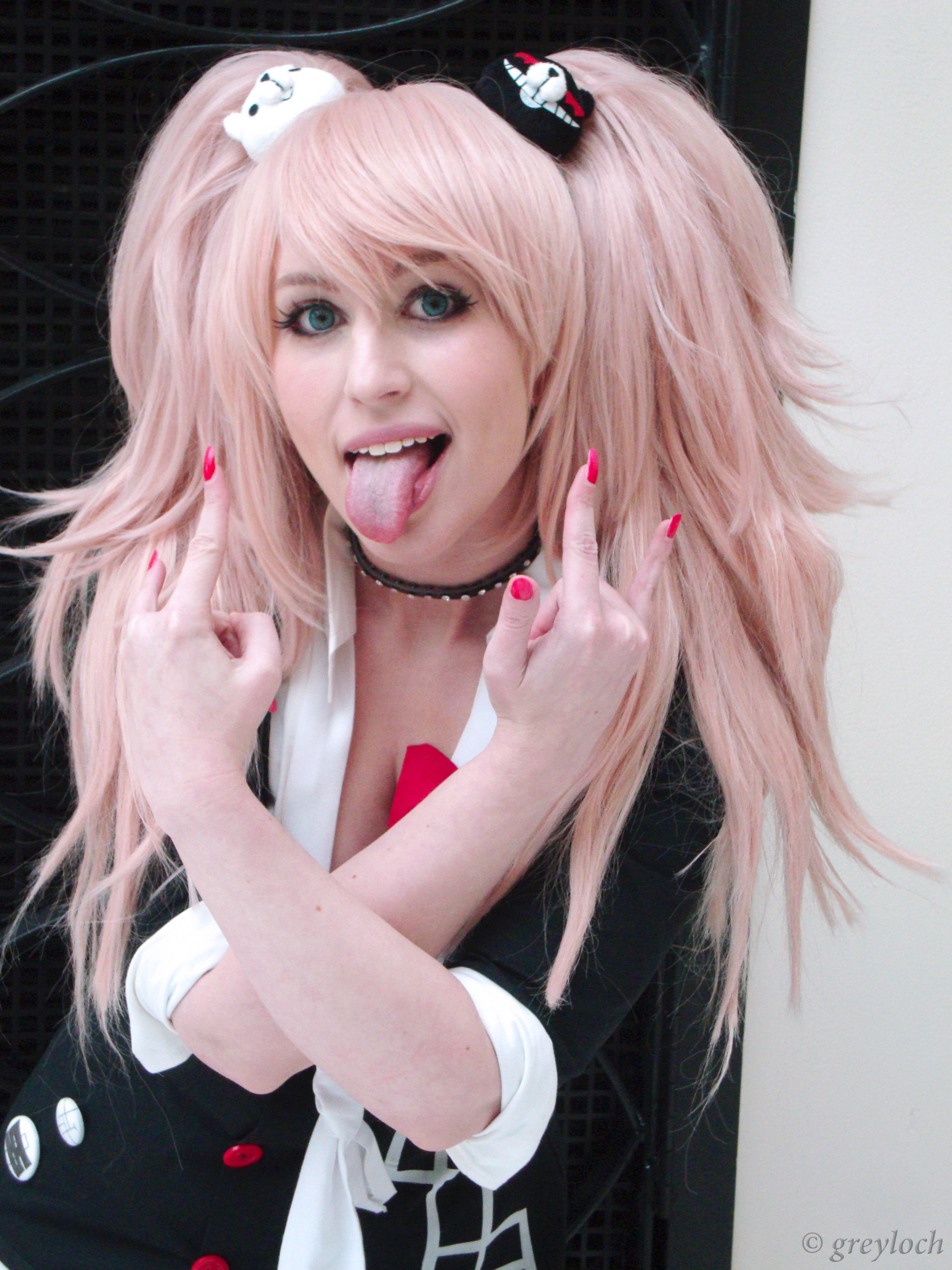
Cosplay of Junko Enoshima from Danganronpa at Katsucon in 2014

Many characters from various Japanese media have a gyaru connection. For example, in the Yakuza series, especially in its third iteration, Yakuza 3. It debuted a side-mission which would then be included with its gameplay and features in later sequels. Where in fictional Kabukichō or as the game refers to it as Kamurocho, the player would need to recruit women to join a hostess club. These women were actual gyaru from the magazine Koakuma Ageha. These models are used as actual character models in the game; their whole appearance was replicated to the smallest detail to have them created and placed as 3D characters. These models from Koakuma Ageha are Sayaka Araki, Nemu, Rina Sakurai, Eri Momoka, Riho Nishiyama, Rina Aikawa, and Shizuka Muto. They have even been compared to their replicated three-dimensional counterparts.

These characters became hostess of these fictional hostess clubs; if the player chooses to do this side-mission and complete it. The hostess club section of the game first appeared in Yakuza 2 in the sense of visiting the clubs themselves and not in the similar way as in the third game where the player recruited actual members for the clubs. They even have their own magazine in the games called Kamutai magazine which is also replica of the actual magazine Koakuma Ageha. This content was omitted in the Western releases of Yakuza 3.

In Danganronpa, the character of Junko Enoshima is inspired by gyaru subculture; she is called a super high school level gyaru (in the English dub, this is changed to "Ultimate Fashionista"). The Persona series also has a gyaru. In Revelations: Persona, there is a kogyaru named Yuka Ayase. No More Heroes 2: Desperate Struggle has a kogyaru enemy as a character. The player must defeat her to proceed in-game; she is known as Shinobu Jacobs who is encountered later in the game. The visual novel escape room series Zero Escape has the character Clover Field (四葉フィールド, Yotsuba fi-rudo) that is portrayed as a gyaru.

The Wagamama Fashion: Girls Mode series, known as Style Savvy and Style Boutique in North America and the PAL region respectively, is based on multiple Japanese street fashion subcultures and has a main focus on brands and selling apparel. The video game has a variety of brands and styles but also some of these that can be interpreted as mimicking or representing some gyaru fashion brands. For example, the in-game apparel brand AZ*USA (AZ-USA in the West) has a striking resemblance to the gyaru brand D.I.A.; another would be the brand CherryBerry (April bonbon in the West) also having its own representation of the amekaji style. Most probable inspiration would be the gyaru brand COCO*LULU.

The video-game franchise Animal Crossing by Nintendo also had a gyaru, but she only appeared in a spin-off game of this series. Specifically the Animal Crossing: Happy Home Designer on the Nintendo 3DS, the character named Lottie appears in that video game for the first time, she is a character represented as an otter. After multiple encounters with her, there will be an in-game event on the third day of gameplay, where her uncle Lyle will state himself that she wears too much makeup in a game dialogue and in a later in-game event she can even be found without her makeup. She will state to the player character, that it was due to the fact she woke up too late for work but would often wear her makeup to impress a male colleague; the colleague's name in game is Digby. She also appears in Animal Crossing: amiibo festival on the Wii U. Here are her looks on in-game. This character has recently been added to the Nintendo Switch version of Animal Crossing, Animal Crossing: New Horizons, through the paid downloadable content of Animal Crossing: Happy Home Paradise. Though that isn't supposedly the only gyaru influenced character in Animal Crossing; but instead of a non-playable character it is an actual villager within the series. The gorilla villager Jane (or Fever, フィーバー) has been remarked having a ganguro like appearance in どうぶつの森 (doubutsu no mori) on the Nintendo 64 and Japanese versions of said game on the GameCube.

Another video game franchise with a gyaru character is the Dragon Quest series. On the Nintendo DS game Dragon Quest IX there is a gyaru as the fairy character, Sandy. The video-game company, Nintendo did not only cater to gyaru by the use of video-game promotions with gyaru or video games related to the gyaru subculture. They have a series of applications that can be used for both the Nintendo DSi and Nintendo 3DS. They are on the Nintendo DSiWare and the Nintendo eShop. It is a purikura application for both video-game consoles developed by the company Atlus. In Japan this series of applications are known as itsudemo purikura kiradekopuremiamu (いつでもプリクラ キラデコプレミアム) and abroad as the 'Sparkle Snapshots' series.

Nintendo has made an homage to gyaru by having weapons in Wii U game Splatoon being inspired by decoden culture as weapons in-game such as the .52 deco gal and .96 deco gal; their name are Japanese puns to gyaru culture through goroawase as .52 deco gal is gotsu (ゴツ) deco gal and .96 deco gal being kuro (クロ) deco gal; they have also used amiibo as a costume for the same game, a kogyaru outfit for female inkling characters. Besides that Splatoon 2 octoling idol Marina voice actress is a gyaru known as Alice Peralta and also has her own group with the voice actress of Pearl as the LAIDBACKS.

The Super Gals! anime series had its own video game; it is a series of threequels published in 2001 and 2002, produced by Konami for the Game Boy Color and the PlayStation. The anime series Hime Gal Paradise also had its own video game on the Nintendo 3DS published by Nippon Columbia-games.

The avatar fashion web browser game and virtual community which later became a sequel series on the Nintendo DS, Poupéegirl, was popular amongst gyaru.

=== Web ===
On the Internet, there are many makeup tutorials and event videos of gyaru meeting each other on YouTube. Many videos discuss this fashion subculture, such as article videos, history videos, makeovers, and questionnaire videos. There is also a video that has been uploaded by the YouTube channel of the older women's magazine Josei Jishin as the Jinsin channel; that has the twins Guri and Gura Yoshikawa giving a make-over to an elderly women to resemble them.

There are also gyaru parody videos and even Japanese television program fragments remain viewable on YouTube, ridiculing gyaru and gyaruo. One of the most famous is the 2011 GAL O sengen (GAL男宣言; lit. 'Gyaru O declaration') created by the Japanese music group Policeman (ポリスマン, porisuman), which achieved brief popularity outside of Japan as an Internet meme. A recent parody that can be also interpreted as an honoring of every notable gyaru that has appeared in manga, anime, and hentai is the YouTube video Gyaru Sushi. It refers to an actual sushi restaurant in Rio de Janeiro.

=== Products and commercial media ===
There are many products for gyaru and products endorsed by them or their companies, such as magazines.

==== Make-up and beauty accessories ====
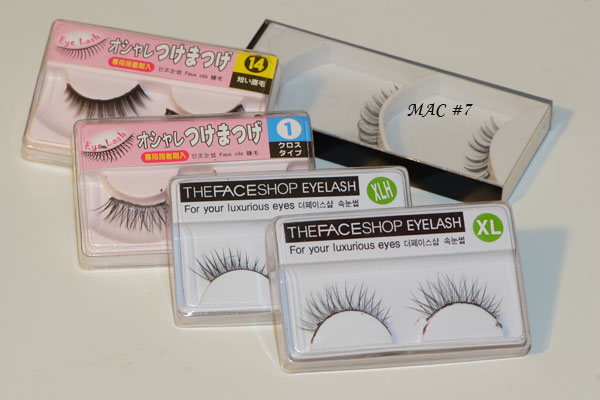
Fake eyelashes

Cosmetic products, ranging from makeup to false eyelashes from non-gyaru-owned cosmetic companies to gyaru-created and owned cosmetic companies were plentiful during the Heisei era.

Tsubasa Masuwaka's cosmetic line kyandidōru (キャンディドール; lit. 'candy doll') and false eyelash brand dōrīuinku (ドーリーウインク; lit. 'dolly wink') are manufactured and sold by the Japanese company Koji Honpo Co. Limited (コージー本舗). Both of these brands still exist, but with new packaging and a different target clientele. Cosmetic company Meiko Cosmetics Incorporated (メイコー化粧品), also known by its license name SHOBIDO (粧美堂), best known for its false eyelash brand daiyamondorasshu (ダイヤモンドラッシュ; lit. 'diamond lash'), released many commercials during the 2010s with many gyaru models from that time period, including Chinatsu Wakatsuki, Natsumi Saito (斉藤夏海), Satomi Yakuwa (八鍬里美), Kurotaki Maria (黒瀧まりあ) and Muto Shizuka (武藤静香).

There are many advertisements for wigs from Japanese companies with endorsements by gyaru models.

There are three notable wig brands: Aquadoll (アクアドール, Akuadōru), LOVES WIG (ラブズウィッグ, Rabuzuuwiggu), and Prisila (プリシラ, Purishira). Aquadoll made a commercial featuring many gyaru models and actresses to promote their various wigs. LOVES WIG made multiple commercials for wigs created with popteen model Kumiko Funayama's endorsement. And Prisila made a commercial with the endorsement of popteen model Nana Suzuki for a smaller array of wigs such as clip-on bangs and clip-on extensions. Prisila is also known for its taglines that have appeared in Japanese television and gyaru magazines as well, such as 'No wig, no life!'

Japanese hair-dye products also had gyaru-based ads during that time that now appear on YouTube. There are two notable hair-dye brands noted in the gyaru subculture: Palty (パルティー, Parutī) and Beauteen (ビューティーン, Byūtīn). Gyaru models Tsubasa Masuwaka and Kumiko Funayama promoted Palty and Beauteen, respectively. Tsubasa Masuwaka has even appeared in advertisements for its male hair-dye variant of Palty. And South Korean Pop group KARA appeared in a 2011 commercial for the Palty brand with Tsubasa Masuwaka placing the dye on her hair while KARA sing their new song, ガールズビーアンビシャス (Gāruzubīanbishasu, lit. 'Girls be ambitious').

During the movement's heyday, electronic hair tools and accessories were created for gyaru. Tsubasa Masuwaka endorsed the TsuyaGla Perfect portable hair straightener collection, which was produced by the brand CJ Prime Shopping (CJプライムショッピング, CJ puraimu shoppingu). It is a hair straightener including accessories such as plastic covers to create curls with them to almost the same effect as a hair curl with a hair curler. They were produced in candy pink, midnight navy, and virgin white. CJ Prime shopping also made a professional version of the TsuyaGla Perfect hair straightener with the endorsement of Jun Komori as gyaru model, this version being simply called TsuyaGla Pro. The same Japanese company have also made a wave hair curling iron and regular curling iron with Kumiko Funayama as the endorser; this time the products were called TsuyaGla Wave and TsuyaGla Curl.

==== Toys and mascot items ====
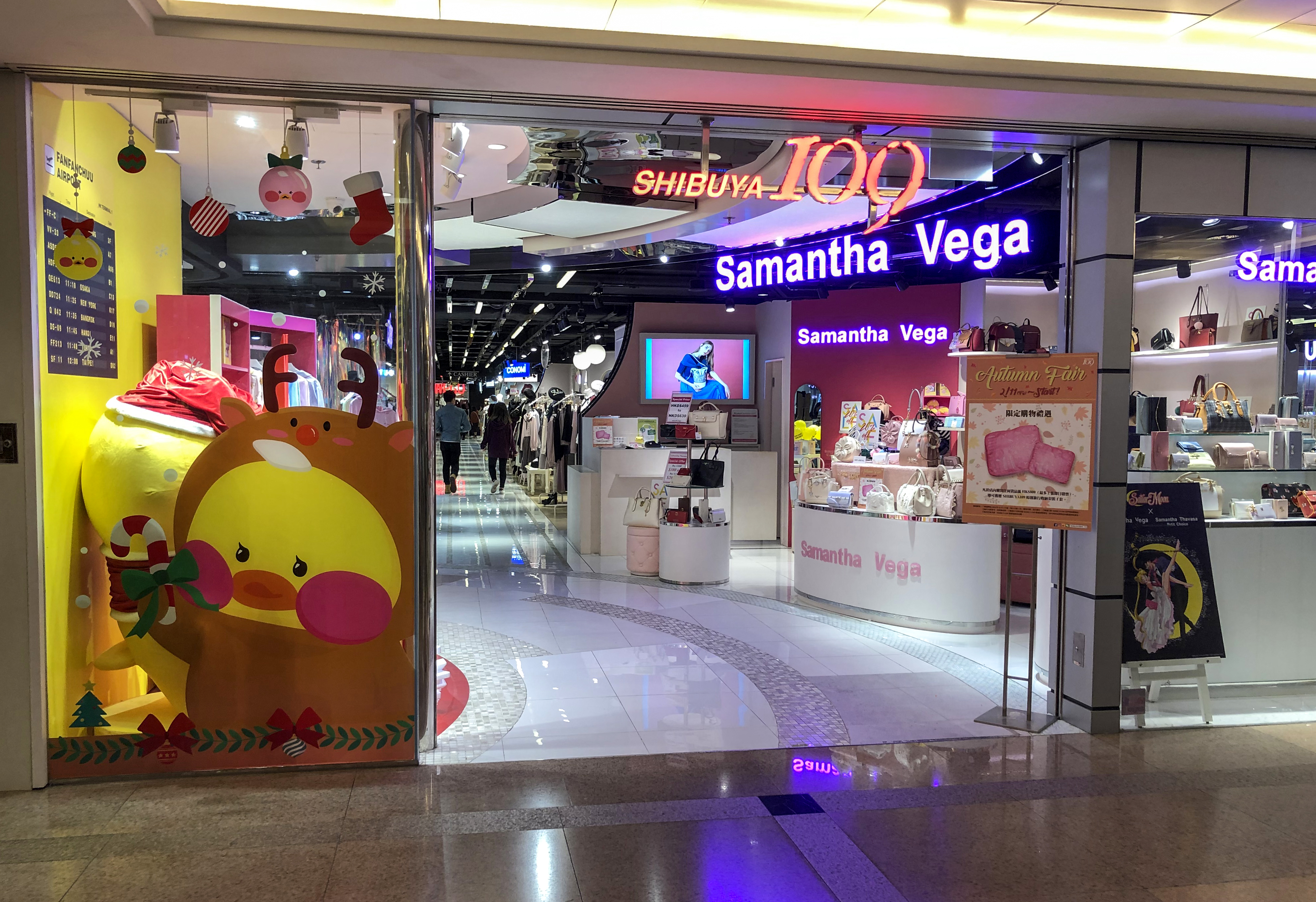
The West entrance of Shibuya 109 in 2018; old 109 department logo present at the time

In 2021, a selection of gashapon were released to the market, made to resemble various folded origami paper cranes made by gyaru. Their poor appearance was noticed by the Japanese public. But these origami were made to have this appearance due to the artificial nails of the gyaru who made them, and were sought after due to their rarity and handmade nature. Each gashapon also came with a philosophical question or phrase. In 2022, gyaru magazine egg produced a series of capsule toys for both gyaru and collectors. The selection of these capsule toys ranged from six different magazine covers made into keychains, plastic pins with gyaru slang and new models from the magazine in metal pins with the added bonus of all of these variants having an added magazine logo as a sticker. On September 14, 2022, Sanrio made a collection of 17 items based on kogyaru subculture, consisting of four mascots on keychains, accessory cases, and hair clips. A collaborative commercial between Russia and Japan was made with a photoshoot with model Natsuko Matsumoto the Russian mascot Cheburashka. The merchandise franchise mameshiba made a short featuring ganguro talking to each other, when the mascot character mameshiba appears and gives worldly triva. The doll Jenny produced by the company Takara Tomy also had gyaru influence, adding an entirely new doll to the Jenny line named Jessica with appropriate gyaru-influenced clothes that are based on the substyle agejo, but are misclassified in the commercial as hime gyaru.

==== Electronics ====
In a competition for the Japanese music company, AVEX Inc., Kumiko Funayama won a special background for Japanese flip phones with Sanrio and Myuumo (ミュゥモ), AVEX's digital music distribution company, to create a specific Hello Kitty character that resembles Kumiko Funayama herself. Another Japanese electronic brand, Fujitsu, collaborated with both Kumiko Funayama and three brands from the Shibuya department store 109: Cecil McBee, COCO*LULU, and Pinky Girls. This mutual effort was made through the use of their flip phone products from the line of NTT Docomo. In 2011, electronics company Panasonic produced the Panasonic Lumix FX77, a camera praised for its use of face-altering functions such as adding makeup onto a photographed bare face. This was commercialized in collaboration with then-gyaru model Yuka Obara, presented by the American news program CBS News on their YouTube channel. The Japanese company FuRyu, which produces purikura machines, collaborated with then-popteen model Tsubasa Masuwaka for their new machine in 2011. In 2011, an iOS 3 "no make-up" application "The すっぴん。ギャル編" or "The スッピン。ギャル編 (Suppin. Gyaru-hen, lit. 'The No make-up gyaru edition') was released. It did the inverse of most photography filters for selfies, removing make-up instead of adding it. There is a kyabajō version as well. The corporation Heiwa, which produces pachinko machines, has also had collaborations with gyaru such as Muto Shizuka and Momoka Eri for making a kyabajō pachinko machine; called パチンコCRラブ嬢小悪魔 (Pachinko CR rabu jō shōakuma).

Naver corporation and Line corporation from their software application line of Line games being known as the free-to-play application Line Play featured gyaru models and singers, or characters from gyaru. It is a social networking and avatar virtual community application that is not only used by gyaru but has gyaru influences within the game and commercial partnerships. The use of these would be through in-game gachapon machines through either in-game currency or by microtransactions where items of virtual furniture or clothes could be acquired by playing them. Those to note are from J-pop singers Ayumi Hamasaki and Koda Kumi; model Kumiko Funayama (舟山久美子), Hikari Shiina and characters from the Sanrio or San-X line or the character Kumatan by Chinatsu Wakatsuki.

== Gallery ==
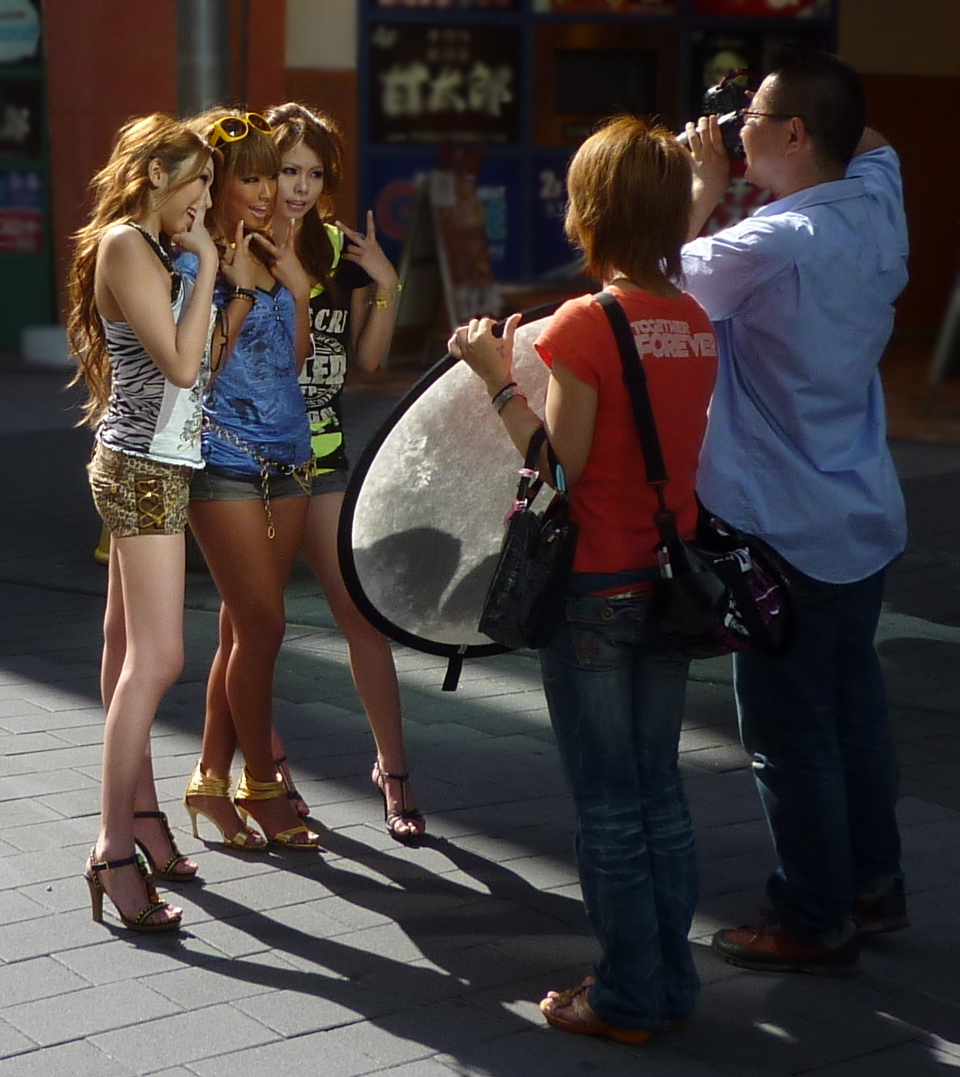
A photo shoot featuring Shibuya style gyarus with both pale and tan skin at Ikebukuro in 2009

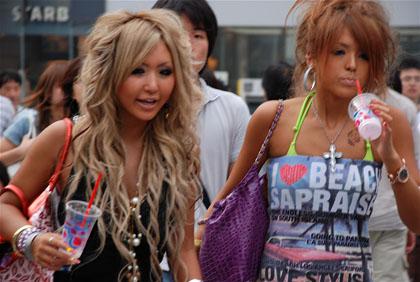
Shibuya style gyaru

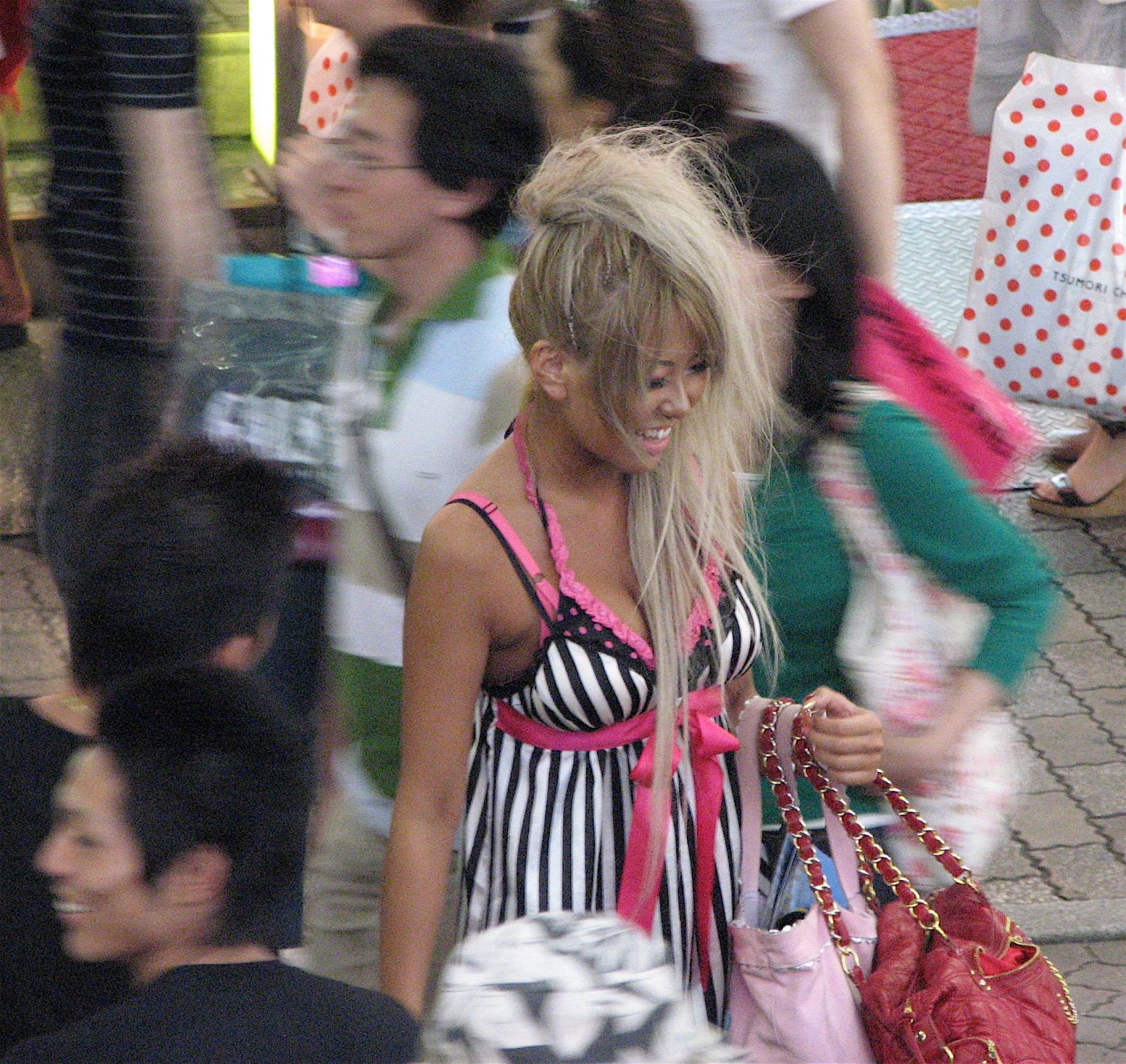
Possible agejō gyaru

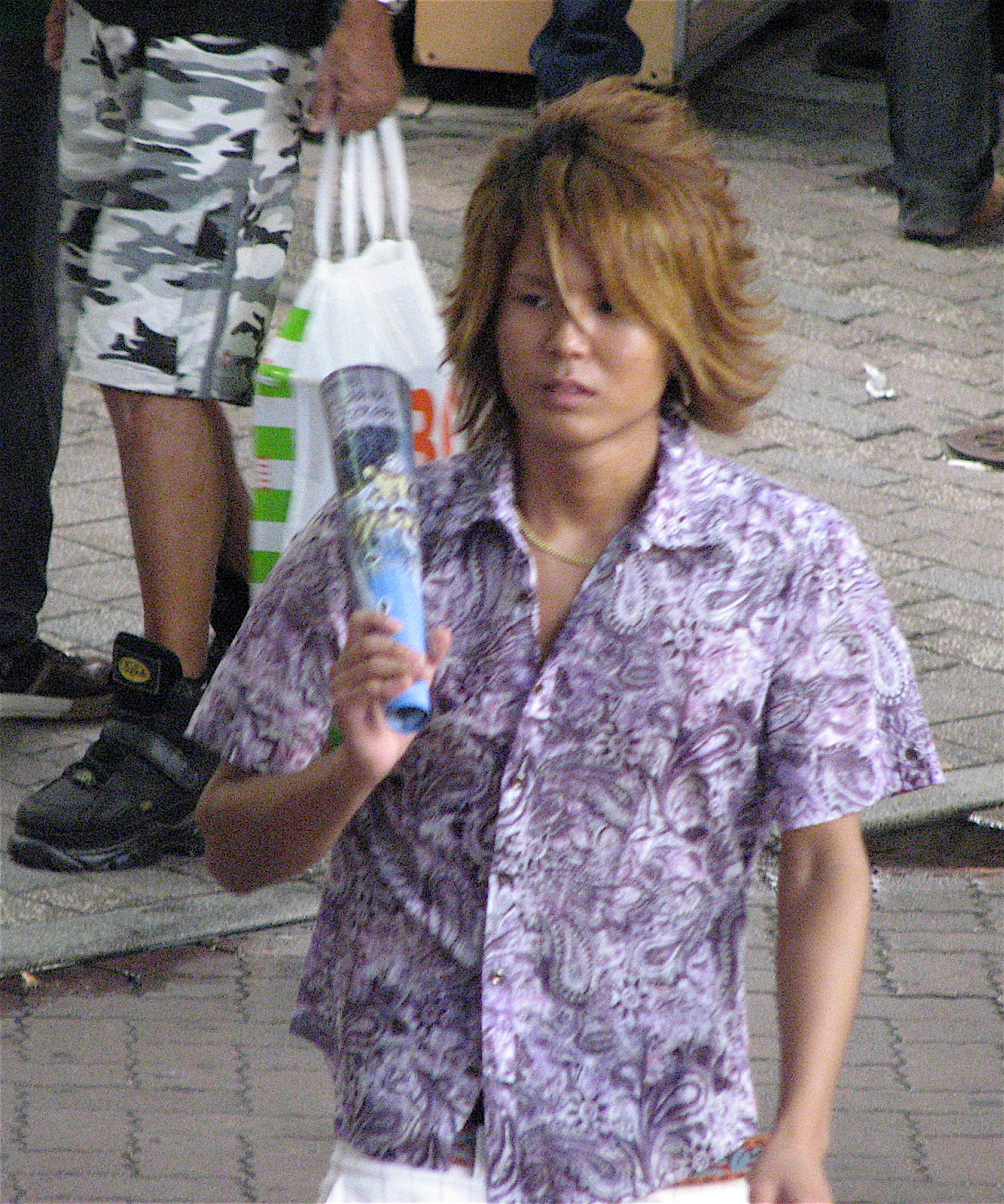
Gyaruo walking around Tokyo

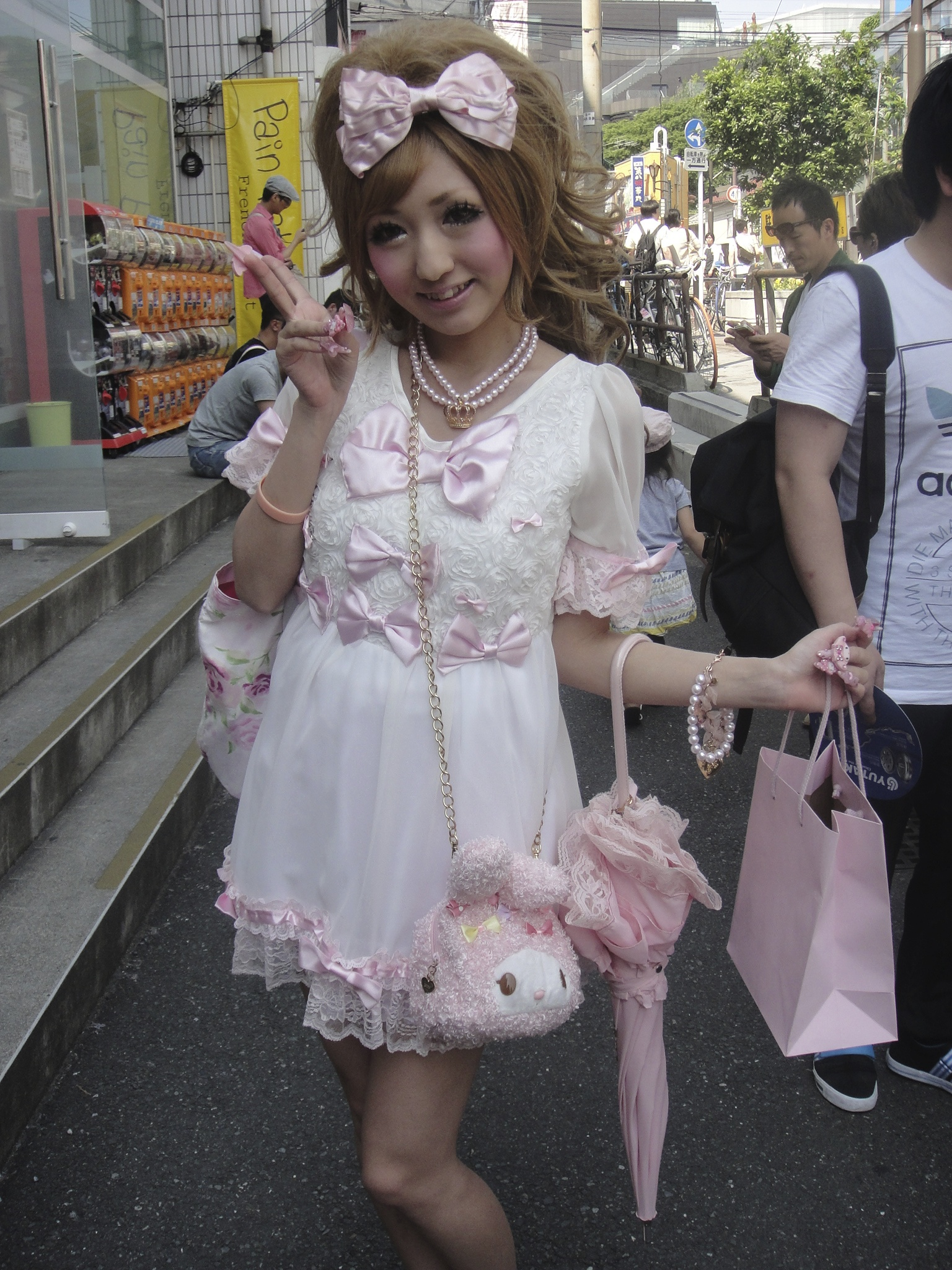
A street snapshot of hime gyaru influencer and koakuma ageha magazine model, Himena Ousaki; taken in 2012

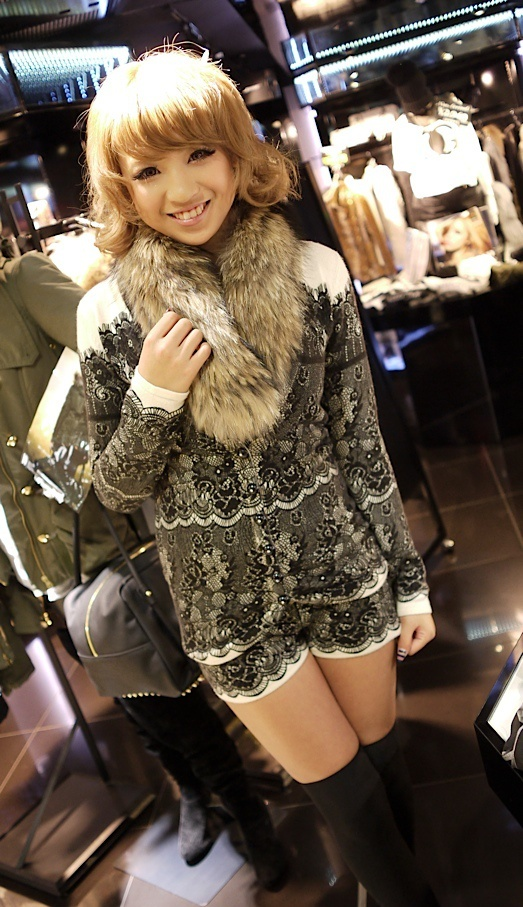
Shibuya 109 shop-staff

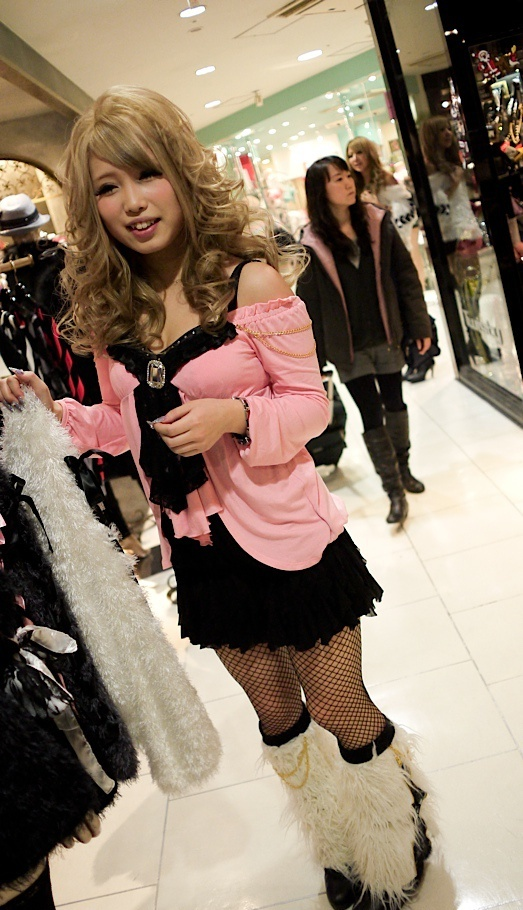
GOLDS Infinity shop-staff at Shibuya 109 during the 2010. She is wearing apparel which is an example of agejō gyaru.

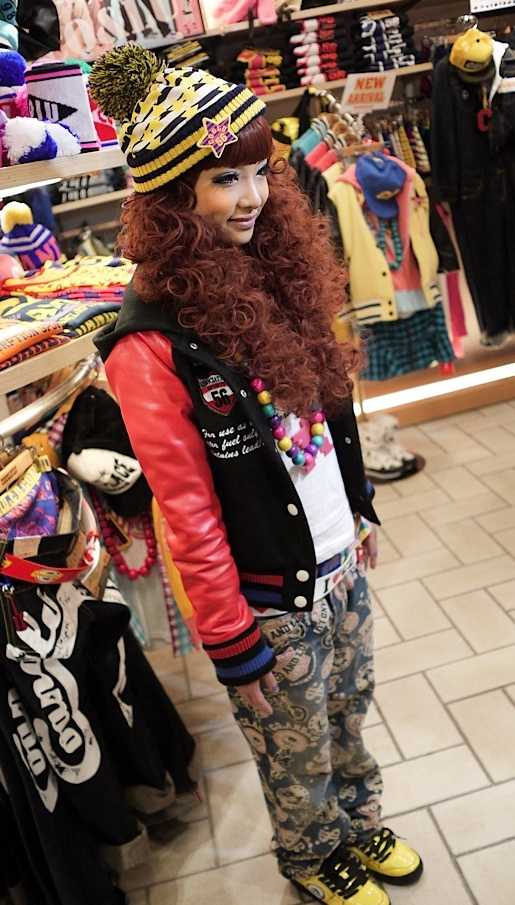
COCOLULU shop-staff in Shibuya 109, an example of amekaji gyaru during the 2010

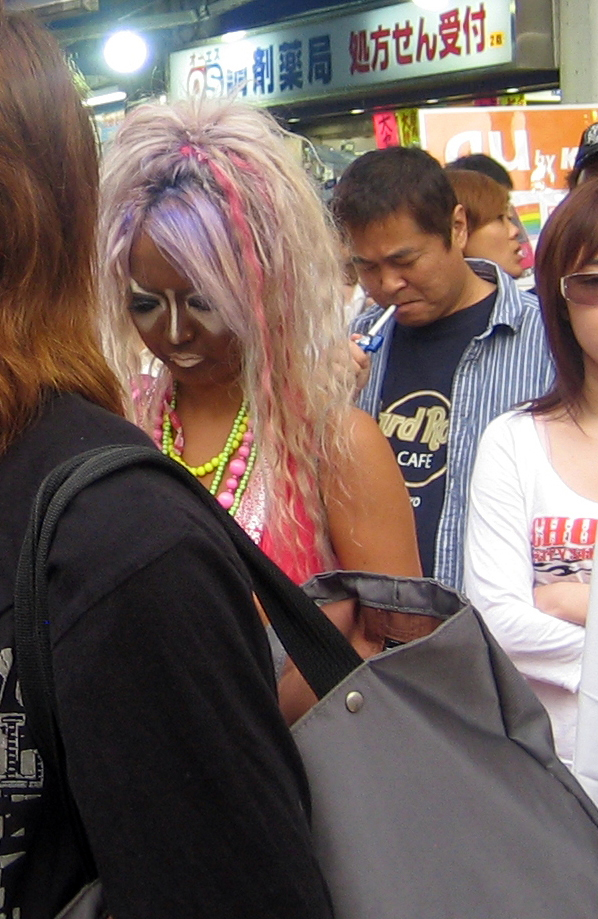
A yamanba taken in 2006

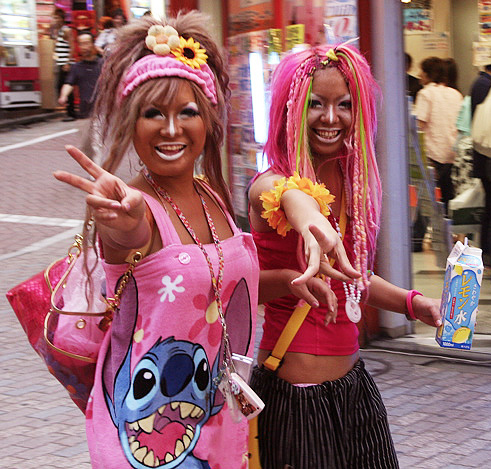
Two manba taken in 2006 doing the hand gesture of the V sign but can also be interpreted as egg pose (エッグポーズ), which is now (Reiwa era) known as the gyaru pose

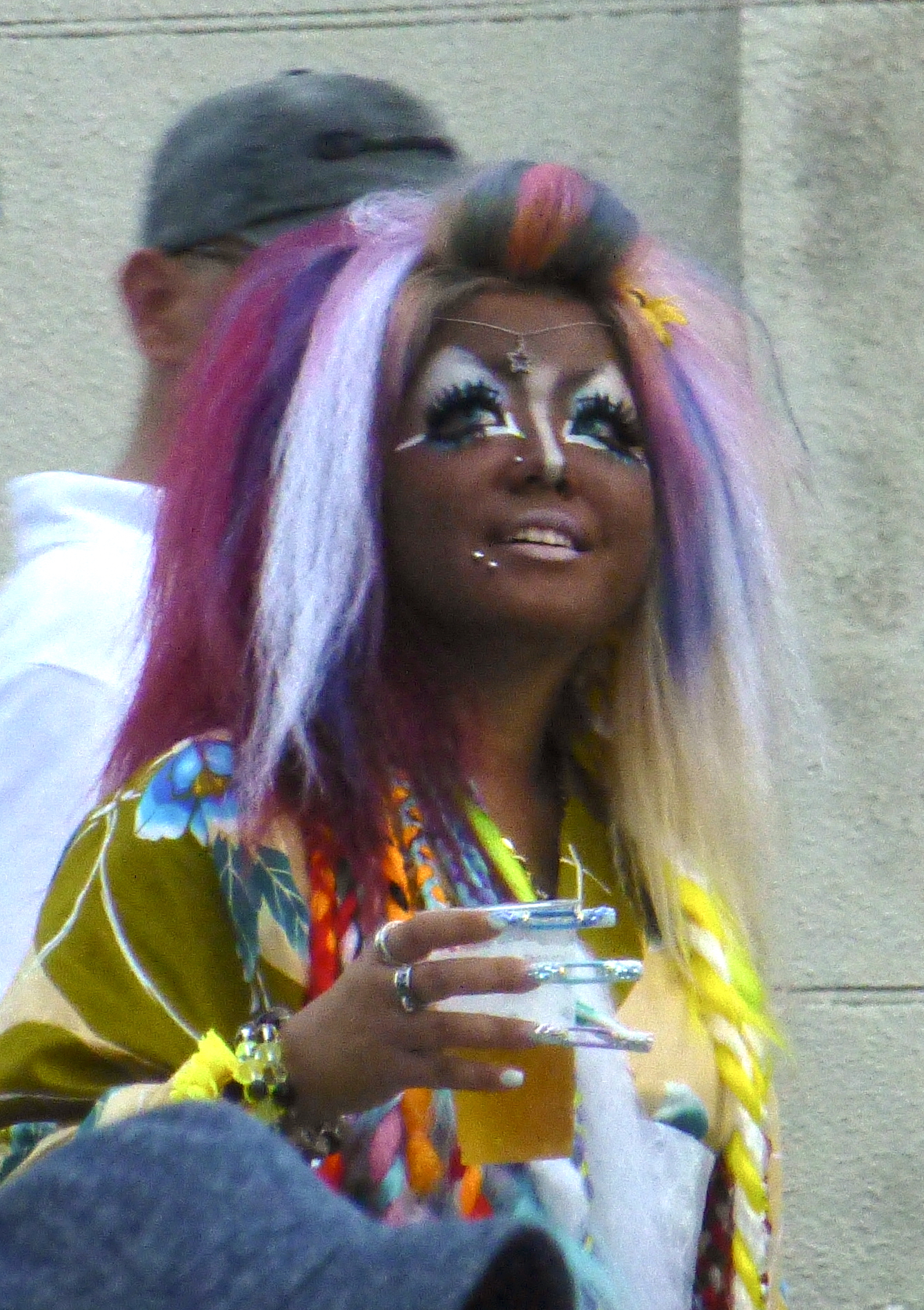
A yamanba at Tokyo taken in 2016

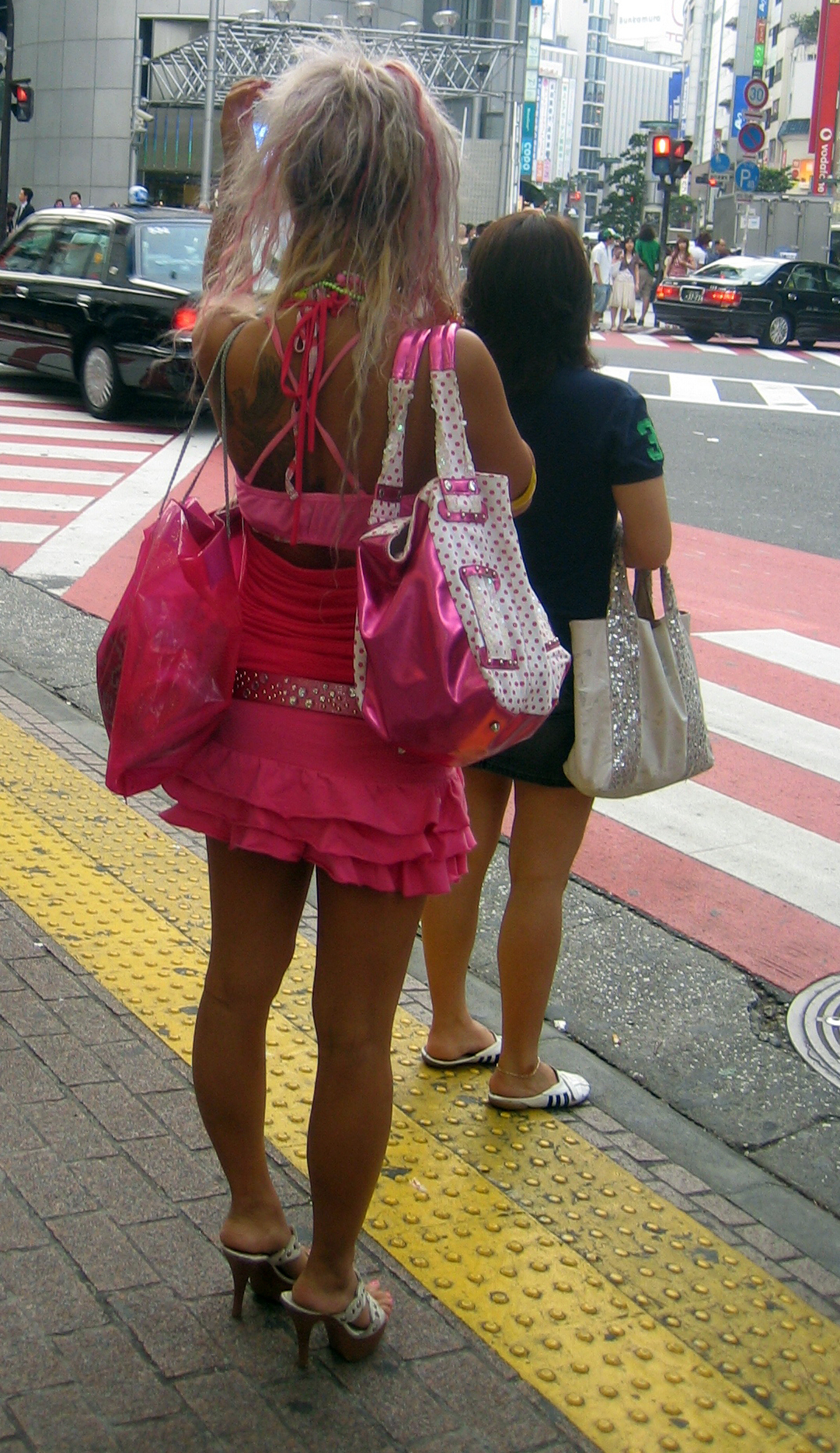
A gyaru in front of Shibuya 109 in 2006

== See also ==
- Cosplay restaurant
- Ecchi
- Gravure Idols
- Gyaru-moji, a type of lettering used in Japanese mobile phone texting to secretly send messages
- Host and hostess clubs
- Materialism
- Panchira
- Sun tanning
- Telekura
- Uniform fetishism
- Zettai ryōiki
