= Sayo Hayakawa =

Japanese fashion model

- 早川沙世
- Born: 23 May 1983 (age 43); Fukuoka, Japan
- Occupations: Fashion model; Cabaret hostess; Company president; Fashion designer
- Known for: Appearing in Koakuma Ageha; Appearing in Ane Ageha; Being a prominent hostess Being an ex-member of SDN48
- Height: 1.68 m (5 ft 6 in)
- Children: 2

Sayo Hayakawa (早川 沙世, Hayakawa Sayo; born 23 May 1983) is a Japanese fashion model. She is best known for her stint as a main model for the Koakuma Ageha cabaret-gyaru fashion magazine.

Hayakawa is well known as a former prominent cabaret hostess. After retiring from nightwork in 2010, she still remained active in Koakuma Ageha and began to be known as a businesswoman as well as a fashion designer.

She left Koakuma Ageha in 2011 and has since become a main model for its sister magazine Ane Ageha. She is also known as a former member of Japanese idol girl group SDN48, in which she remained for a short period in 2011.

== Career ==
Hayakawa was born in Fukuoka, Japan. Her parents divorced and she was raised by her mother. She began modeling while working at a hostess bar in Fukuoka. After moving to Tokyo in 2004, she worked as a model and race queen, until she re-entered nightwork. She became the top hostess at R, a Roppongi hostess club, in term of sales, and at one point, was considered the most prominent hostess in all of Japan.

After debuting in Koakuma Ageha, she appeared regularly in the magazine while working as a hostess, until she retired from the nightwork in 2010. In 2011 she joined the SDN48 girl idol group and made several activities as a member of the group, such as attending a handshake event, however, she left the group only two months after joining, to concentrate on her main businesses; modeling and managing her own salon which she opened in Shinjuku, Tokyo for hostesses.

Hayakawa stopped appearing in Koakuma Ageha with her last appearance for its July 2011 issue, and began appearing in its sister magazine, Ane Ageha, as a main model.

== Nightwork ==
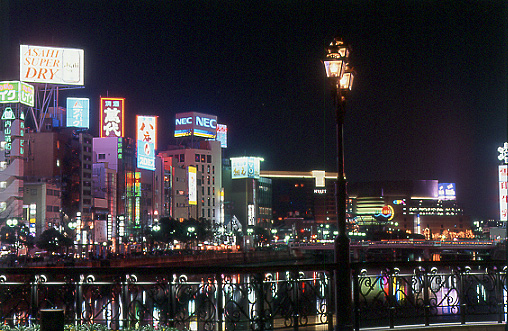
Nakasu at night

Hayakawa's nightwork career began immediately after dropping out of high school, when she began working at a Nakasu, Fukuoka hostess bar where she instantly became the top hostess. At the age of 18, she was headhunted as mama by another hostess bar in Nakasu, becoming a mama even though she was a minor, and leading the bar to astonishing financial success. She was in Nakasu until she moved to Tokyo at the age of 21.

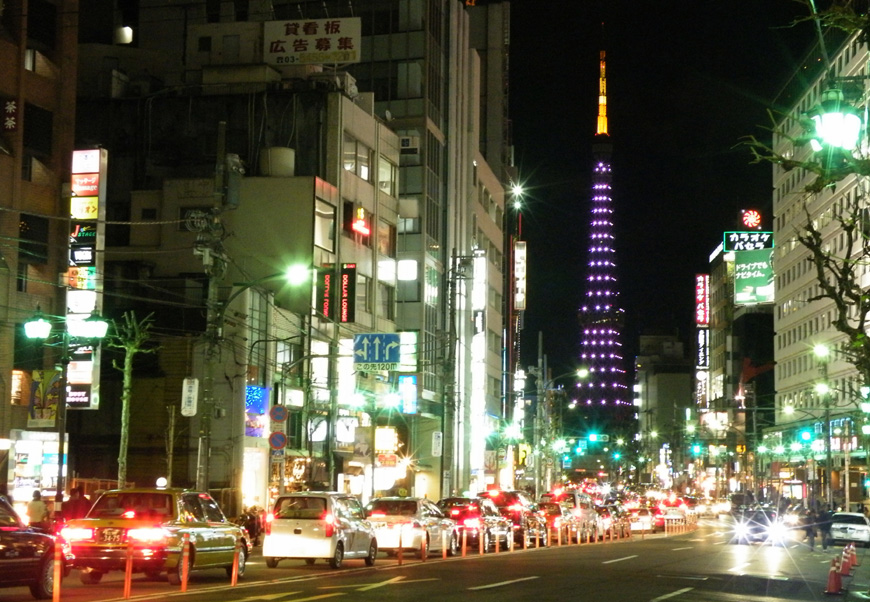
Roppongi

After moving to Tokyo, Hayakawa began working at a high-class Roppongi hostess club, Piano, and rose to the club's second-ranked hostess within two months. She then moved to Ginza and was hired by a newly opened high-class hostess club, Bisser, at the age of 22, where her colleagues were like "future actresses" and "girls whose faces could often be seen on magazines" and the customers were the likes of overly-wealthy businessmen, overly-wealthy professional criminals, and so on. The club, Bisser, did not publicize performance data of hostesses, but she could have been one of the best at the club until she left Ginza and moved to Shinjuku at the age of 23.

From 2005 to 2006, Hayakawa worked at two Kabukicho, Shinjuku hostess bars, Azian Club and Gentleman'z Club, and returned to Roppongi to work at R, where she met her future long-term partner, Ageha colleague Sayaka Araki. R was the last nightwork place for Hayakawa, who retired as a hostess at the age of 26. Sayaka Araki, in response to the retirement, was quoted as saying: "I feel it is a really, really great loss for the world of water trade".

== Personal life ==
Hayakawa, along with the likes of Sayaka Araki, is a member of international charity organization H=and Project since 2009 when it was founded after the death of fellow Ageha model Sumire. She is an active member of the organization, constantly making donations to the charity. As of 2013, she is single and lives in Tokyo.

In July 2014, she gave birth to her first child, a baby boy. Later in May 2018, she gave birth to her second child, a baby girl, and she become the single mother.

== Notable appearances ==
=== Magazines ===
- Ane Ageha
- Koakuma Ageha
- Men's Egg
- Men's Spider
- Edge Style, since the first issue released in November 2009 with Jun Komori, Eri Momoka, Hiromi Imaizumi, Kei, Kinkira*Kin, Ayana Tsubaki, Rumi Itahashi

=== Events ===
- Shibuya Girls Collection 2009 S/S
- Sixh.×Men's SPIDER 2010, with Sixh., Yu Ayukawa, Irokui., Men'S Spider Band, Rina Sakurai, Tenchimu, Koriki Choshu, among others
- Campus Collection 2010 Spring
- KyabaRaku Award : Kickoff Party, with Eri Momoka, Rina Sakurai, Ayaka Endoh, Rina Ayukawa, Rin, Cocoa Aiuchi, Marie Iemura, Kanae Sugiyama, Hozunyam, Yuki-ichigo, Guri Yoshikawa, Gura Yoshikawa, Kanae Watanabe, Himena Osaki, Sawa Yamagami, Lala

=== Others ===
- Record jacket : "Koakuma Heaven", by Gackt, released in June 2009 with Sayaka Araki among others
- DVD : "Kiramori", released in June 2009 with Sumire, Kyoka Ichijo, Erisa Kaminomiya, Marie Iemura, Kinkira*Kin, Reina Takizawa, Mipo, Ayana Tsubaki
- Book : Gal's Collection, a Men's Egg Special Edition released in March 2010 with Hiromi Hosoi, Kanako Kawabata, Kanae Shishikura, Remi Sakamoto, Aina Tanaka, Yuma Takahashi, Makoto Minami, Mari Komatsuzaki, among others
- Song : "Abazure", included in Min Min Min, as a member of SDN48, released in August 2011
- Mixed martial arts event : Hinokuni Kakuto Densetsu Legend 2, as a special MC, held in December 2011 with Peter Aerts, Rie Otomo, among others
