= LGBTQ culture in Japan =

LGBTQ culture in Japan has recently begun to distinguish. The Japanese adopted the English term gender (ジェンダー, jendā) to describe cultural concepts of feminine and masculine. Previously, sei was used to distinguish the binary biological sexes, female and male, as well as the concept of gender. Ai Haruna and Ayana Tsubaki, two high-profile transgender celebrities, have gained popularity and have been making the rounds on some very popular Japanese variety shows. As of April 2011, Hiromi, a fashion model, came out as a lesbian. There is a genre of anime and manga that focuses on gay male romance (and sometimes explicit content) known as yaoi as well as its female-oriented counterpart yuri.

== Linguistic history ==
Only recently has the Japanese language begun to distinguish sex and gender. Additionally, no explicit connection had been made prior between gender and sexual preference. The Japanese adopted the English term gender (ジェンダー, jendā) to describe cultural concepts of feminine and masculine. Previously, sei was used to distinguish the binary biological sexes, female and male, as well as the concept of gender. Many terms describing gender presentation had vastly irregular meanings such as okama, whose definitions included: a gay male, a feminine-behaving male, or a crossdresser. Umbrella terms such as these had a negative sociological impact, generalizing various queer identities into a single concept. Similar to the experience of LGBTQ people in other countries, Japanese LGBTQ people lacked the linguistic space to exist in.

=== Controversies ===
Terms such as hentai, having long been used in the pejorative sense, have recently been reclaimed by the LGBTQ community in Japan. Specialized publications featuring LGBTQ content have been using the term hentai zasshi or "perverted publications." Many Japanese-to-English translators for LGBTQ content believe that the use of the term hentai roughly equates to that of the English term queer.

== Other LGBTQ terms ==
Though the Japanese have borrowed a number of foreign terms in the process of globalization, Japan is by no means a passive recipient of Western discourse. Foreign terms have been selectively used to deliver nuanced Japanese understandings of sexual and gender identity. Homophones such as the Japanese gei and the English "gay" do not denote the same meaning or connotation.

== LGBTQ figures in popular media ==
A number of personalities who appear on television in Japan daily are gay or transgender, or cultivate such an image as part of their public persona.

A number of artists, nearly all male, have begun to speak publicly about their homosexuality, appearing on various talk shows and other programs, their celebrity often focused on their sexuality; twin pop-culture critics Piko and Osugi are an example. Akihiro Miwa, a drag queen, was the television advertisement spokesperson for many Japanese companies ranging from beauty to financial products. Kenichi Mikawa, a former pop idol singer who now blurs the line between male and female costuming and make-up, can also regularly be seen on various programs, as can crossdressing entertainer Peter. Singer-songwriter and actress Ataru Nakamura was one of the first transgender personalities to become highly popular in Japan; in fact, sales of her music rose after she came out as a transgender woman in 2006.

Some non-gay entertainers have used stereotypical references to homosexuality to increase their profile. Razor Ramon Sumitani a.k.a. Hard Gay (HG), a comedian, shot to fame after he began to appear in public wearing a leather harness, hot pants and cap. His outfit, name, and trademark pelvis thrusting and squeals earned him the adoration of fans and the scorn of many in the Japanese gay community.

Ai Haruna and Ayana Tsubaki, two high-profile transgender celebrities, have gained popularity and have been making the rounds on some very popular Japanese variety shows. As of April 2011, Hiromi, a fashion model, came out as a lesbian.

A greater amount of gay and transgender characters have also begun appearing (with positive portrayals) on Japanese television, such as the highly successful Hanazakari no Kimitachi e and Last Friends television series.

== In anime and manga ==
=== Yaoi ===
There is a genre of anime and manga that focuses on gay male romance (and sometimes explicit content) known as yaoi. Yaoi titles are primarily marketed to women, and are commonplace in bookstores (normally found in or near to the shōjo manga section). Various terms are used in Japan to refer to yaoi.

The blanket term "yaoi" is an acronym for the phrase "Yama nashi, ochi nashi, imi nashi", which means "no peak, no point, no meaning". (A backronym meant as a joke identifies it as "Yamete, oshiri (ga) itai" which literally means "Stop, my bottom hurts!").

"June" refers to plots containing romance and drama that feature mature, adult male characters. "BL" ("Boys' Love") refers to stories that either contain younger characters, or more light-hearted romance (as an alternative to more sexual content). The phrase "shōnen-ai", translated from Japanese in the past as "boy love", is used to describe non-sexual homosexuality in either adult male characters or younger male characters. When manga or anime depicts sexual activities between young boys, or young boys with adults (male or female), it is known as "shotacon", which should not be confused with "shōnen-ai".

One of the most popular anime in modern times, Yuri!!! on Ice, depicted a love story between two (presumably) homosexual figure skaters Yuri Katsuki and Victor Nikiforov. The show was so well regarded among the figure skating community and anime fans worldwide that it was even performed at the 2018 Winter Olympics by Miu Suzaki and Ryuichi Kihara from Japan.

Among the large fan demographics in Western countries, this terminology is more or less condensed to "yaoi" and "shōnen-ai"; "yaoi" is used in reference to graphic descriptions of homosexual sex and/or adult drama, and "shōnen-ai" is used in reference to romantic situations with younger characters.

=== Gei-com ===
Gei-comi ("gay-comics") are gay-romance themed comics aimed at gay men. While yaoi comics often assign one partner to a stereotypical heterosexual female role, gei-comi generally depict both partners as masculine and in an equal relationship. Another common term for this genre is bara, stemming from the name of the first publication of this genre to gain popularity in Japan, Barazoku. The former term is more common in Japan, used similarly to yaoi as a blanket term for a wide range of publications, while the latter is more common in the West and more often refers to a general aesthetic rather than specifically the genre of comics.

=== Yuri ===
Lesbian-romance themed anime and manga is known as yuri (which means "lily"). Yuri is used to describe female-female relationships in material marketed to straight men, straight women, or lesbians, despite significant stylistic and thematic differences between works aimed at these different audiences. Another word that has recently become popular in Japan as an equivalent of yuri is "GL" (meaning "Girls' Love" and inspired by "Boys' Love"). There are a variety of yuri titles (or titles that heavily integrate yuri content) aimed at women, such as Revolutionary Girl Utena, Oniisama E, Maria-sama ga Miteru, Sailor Moon (most notably the third season, as well as the fifth season), Strawberry Shake Sweet, Love My Life, etc.; and there are a variety of yuri titles (or titles that heavily integrate yuri content) aimed at men, such as Kannazuki no Miko, Strawberry Panic! (although it was written by Sakurako Kimino, a female author), Simoun, and My-Hime. Comic Yuri Hime (which is primarily aimed at women) is a manga magazine that focuses solely on yuri stories.

== In other media ==
With the rise of a visible gay community and the attendant rise of media for gay audiences, the Hadaka Matsuri ("Naked Festival") has become a fantasy scenario for gay videos.

Superstar Japanese recording artist Ayumi Hamasaki dedicated a song to celebrate gay rights titled "How Beautiful You Are". The music video depicted gay couples and lesbian couples kissing and celebrating.

== Events ==
Tokyo hosts two pride parades: Tokyo Rainbow Pride (TRP, started in 2011) and Tokyo Pride (started in 1994).

Pride marches and parades have also been held in other major cities across Japan. A Rainbow March Pride parade was held in Sapporo from 1996 to 2013.

== See also ==
- Genderless fashion in Japan
- LGBTQ rights in Japan
- Recognition of same-sex unions in Japan
- Sexual minorities in Japan
