= Joy (model) =

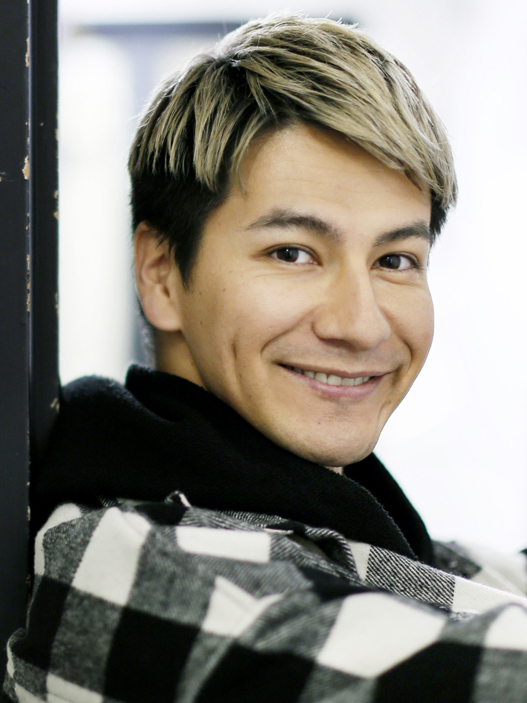
- Born: Joseph Greenwood; 15 April 1985 (age 41); Takasaki, Gunma
- Occupations: Model; television personality; singer
- Spouse: Mai Watanabe (m. 2019)
- Children: 1
- Modeling information
- Height: 190 cm (6 ft 3 in)

Joseph Greenwood (ジョゼフ・グリーンウッド, Jozefu Gurīn'uddo; born 15 April 1985), known by his stage name Joy (stylised as JOY), is a Japanese fashion model, variety television personality, commentator, singer, and chairperson. He is represented by Grick, and is currently the only male to be represented by this agency.

He was born in Takasaki, Gunma. His father is English and his mother is Japanese, from Gunma Prefecture. He graduated from Takasaki Municipal Terao Elementary School, Takasaki Municipal Terao Junior High School, and Okayama University of Science High School (communication system). His older sister Sophia is also a model.

== Biography ==
While at the Okayama University of Science High School (correspondence education program), he started his model activities at the magazine MensEGG ("Spring and Summer College Students White Book" corner in June 2003) after being referred his older sister Sophia. In February 2009, he made his first TV appearance on the variety show Shabekuri 007 (Nippon TV) along with Tsubasa Masuwaka as a MensEGG model for the corner, "Who is Your Husband!?".

He showed off an impression of Sei Hiraizumi and gathered a lot of attention. When he later appeared again on the same programme, he appeared as the "Joy Team (Joy Gundan)", a reversal of positions with Naoki Umeda who was then the main. As a result of these appearances he joined the talent agency to Bennu in the spring of that same year, and started full-scale activities as a "talent" (entertainer) from that autumn.

On January 20, 2010, he also debuted as a singer under the unit "Naoki Umeda featuring Joy" with MensEGG model Naoki Umeda. He was later hospitalised, however, with pulmonary tuberculosis in March 2011. He temporarily suspended his professional work to focus on his medical treatment, but announced on his official blog on June 13 that he left the hospital. On the 29th of the same month, his first regular show Joynt! (Gunma Television) started. Based on his previous experience having fought tuberculosis in 2011, he was appointed the "Stop TB Partnership Japan Ambassador".

From 2015, he made regular appearances on Go Go! Smile! (CBC Television) and, as of April 1, 2016, he changed talent agencies to Grick from Bennu. In February 2017, he participated in the competition "Second Generation Sunshine Saito Grand Prix" on the TV showDowntown no Gaki no Tsukai ya Arahende!! and took first place. On June 26, 2019, his marriage to model Mai Watanabe was announced. The following year, on June 10, 2020, they announced that Mai was pregnant with their first child and their daughter was born on October 19, 2020.

== Personal life ==
His father is a conversational English teacher and he speaks with his father in English. Neither himself nor his family knows the origin of his stage name Joy. However, it may come from the similarity between Joey (ジョーイ), a common nickname for Joseph, and Joy (ジョイ) in Japanese. In junior high school he was selected for the Gunma Prefectural football team and even participated as a trainee for Arsenal F.C. youth for two weeks due to his father's British connection. Although he was regarded as having a promising future in football, he hurt his back in his first year of high school and had to give up his dream to become a football player. This caused him to go through a period of depression. At that time, however, his sister started to work as a model and he began to look up to her. Football continues to be his hobby even now, with him often appearing on sports television programmes such as Honoo-no Taiiku-kai TV.

Before his modelling debut, he worked at a big cante/beer garden in Takasaki store at Takashimaya. He is often mistaken for Yuji because of their similarity in character and appearance. In 2015, they both guest appeared on Tetsuko no Heya.

He is a professed fan of Minami Takahashi of AKB48, but Takahashi's response was to chuckle and say it was "impossible (to see you as a man)."[?] He is also a fan of Uverworld, Unjash, Konan, Sei Hiraizumi, and Domingo Guzmán. He formed a "half party" with Antony, Yukio Ueno, and Mandy Sekiguchi. "Half" refers to people who are half-Japanese, born of one Japanese parent and one parent of another nationality or ethnic background.

== Filmography ==
=== Television ===
Regular

- "Anata Hontōni Ria Jūdesu ka?" –Ryaku shite "Hon Ria"– (Niconico Live, broadcasts monthly, Jan 2011 –)/MC
- Joy no Asobu-TV Joynt! (GTV, 5 Issho 3 Channel, Jun 2011 –)/MC (Moderator)
- Hirunandesu! Tuesday Joy no Rosen Bus sugo ro ku Tabi (NTV, Mar 2013 –)
- Chō Do S Night (SBS, Fridays 24:50–25:10, first broadcast on 3 Apr 2015)/MC
- Go Go! Smile! (CBC-TV, Thursdays Apr 2015 –)
- Shumido ki'! "Asteroid in My Room –Aquarium and Terrarium–" (NHK E, Jun/Jul 2016)/as student (Terrarium in charge)
- Aitsu no Honne –Onna wa Shiranai Otoko no Kimochi– (CX, 9 Jan 2018 – ) Regular

Quasi-regular

- Akko ni Omakase! (TBS)
- 5-Ji ni Muchū! (Tokyo MX, 10 Oct 2014)/Changed to Ryo Fukawa during the summer vacation, appearing as one of the daily changing hit MC

Dramas

- Kanagawa-ken Atsugi-shi Laundry Chigasaki (Mar 2016, MBS, TBS) – Staged in Atsugi, Kanagawa
- Shōga Dorama: Ryōma ga Kuru (December 2018, Jidaigeki Senmon Channel; one episode)

Advertisements

- Ad Council Japan "Campaign for Tuberculosis Prevention in 2015 Joy to Ijin" (Jul 2015 –)

=== Films ===
- Kamen Rider × Kamen Rider Gaim & Wizard: The Fateful Sengoku Movie Battle (Toei Company, 2013)/as Ieyasu
- Honey Flappers (2014)/as Taiji

=== Magazines ===
- MensEGG – Exclusive model (Graduated Jun 2010)

=== Books ===
- 1st photo essay Joyfull (Gakken Publishing, released Jun 2010)

=== CD ===
- Naoki Umeda featuring Joy 1st single "Be With You" (Brand New Music, 20 Jan 2010)

=== Webcast ===
- Ano Kami Hikōki kumori Sora wa tte
- Saigo no Ame
- Yubiwa
- Nagaiai (Duet with Takuya Matsuoka)
- Radio programme Take to Joy no Main Kuraimu*With lucky person Take, even on YouTube Main Kuraimu, etc.
- Internet programme F.Chan TV (Football Channel)

=== Fashion shows ===
- Tokyo Girls Collection
- Kobe Collection
- Shibuya Girls Collection
- Shizuoka Collection

=== Events ===
- Minakami, Gunma no Hanabi Taikai (1 Man-patsu) Mae ni Kaisai sa reta Talk Show (16 Aug 2012)
- Dragon Quest XI Countdown Carnival (27 May – 17 Jul 2017)
