= Hikari Shiina =

Japanese model, singer, and television personality

- 椎名 ひかり
- Born: November 18, 1994 (age 31); Saitama Prefecture, Japan
- Other names: Pikarin (ぴかりん); Pikarin Shiina (椎名ぴかりん)
- Occupations: Model; singer; television personality
- Years active: 2009-present
- Agent: Vithmic
- Height: 150 cm (4 ft 11 in)
- Musical career
- Genres: J-pop
- Instrument: Vocals
- Label: Avex Trax
- Website: www.pikarin.jp

Hikari Shiina (椎名 ひかり, Shiina Hikari; born November 18, 1994), is a Japanese model, singer, television personality, and actress. Shiina debuted as a model in the fashion magazine Ranzuki in 2009. She modeled exclusively for the fashion magazine Popteen from 2010 to 2016.

In addition to modeling, Shiina debuted as an idol singer under the name Pikarin Shiina (椎名 ぴかりん, Shiina Pikarin), releasing her first single "Shinryaku Pikarin Densetsu" on December 12, 2012.

== Career ==
=== Modeling career ===
During middle school, Shiina often watched anime and played video games at home due to frequently being suspended for violence, such as destroying property and throwing firecrackers. Shiina admitted at one point in her life, she had suicidal thoughts. After seeing an application for magazine models, she decided to apply to "shine somewhere." In 2009, Shiina began appearing in the fashion magazine Ranzuki as an amateur model, and subsequently began modeling for other gyaru fashion magazines such as Egg and Men's Egg. From 2010 to 2016, she modeled exclusively for the fashion magazine Popteen under the nickname "Pikarin." While modeling for Popteen, Shiina's cosplay photoshoots of anime characters went viral, notably during a time where there was no crossover between gyaru fashion and anime.

=== Music career ===
In 2012, Shiina made her singing debut under the name Pikarin Shiina and branded herself as an "idol from the Demon World." Shiina thought up her Pikarin persona while modeling for Popteen. She released her first single "Shinryaku Pikarin Densetsu" on December 12, 2012, which was used as an ending theme to the television program Happy Music. On October 16, 2013, Shiina released "Toro Amachu" as her second single, which was used as the theme song for Donyatsu, an anime series she also starred in. On May 21, 2014, Shiina released her first studio album, titled Shikkoku no Yami ni Somarishi Utagoe ga Kisama ni mo Kikoeru ka... This was followed up with the release of her second album, Makai no Owari, on August 26, 2015.

On May 3, 2016, Shiina released and wrote the lyrics for the song "Makai Shinjū", which was produced by Kenta Matsukura. The single was released with "Mitsu to Batsu" as a double A-side. On December 14, 2016, she released "Dogeza Road" on digital services as a collaboration song with Village Vanguard. On May 3, 2017, she released the song "Ba-Ba-Bah-Ba-Baumkuchen" as her fourth single, which was used as the ending theme to the television program Mutoma 2. The single included the song "Geboku Gebo Gebo!!" as a double A-side. On November 20, 2018, Shiina released her fifth single, "Fukanzen na Boku to Kanseisareta Kaisha", with "Hate! Hate! Hate!" as its leading track.

=== Acting career ===
Shiina had an appearance in the Tokyo Stage production of the Ace Attorney 2: Farewell My Turnabout, working in the B-Cast position to star in the role of Maya Fey, which she shared with her A-Cast co-star Karin Ogino.

== Publications ==
=== Photo books ===
| Year | Title | Publisher | ISBN |
|---|---|---|---|
| 2014 | Shiina Pikarin: Kaitai Shinsho (椎名ぴかりん 解体新書) | Kadokawa Shoten | ISBN 978-4758412360 |
| 2015 | Hikari Hatachi no Ryōiki (ひかりハタチのりょーいき) | Wani Books | ISBN 978-4847047237 |

== Discography ==
=== Studio albums ===
List of studio albums, with selected chart positions, sales figures and certifications
| Title | Year | Album details | Peak chart positions | Sales |
| Title | Year | Album details | JPN | Sales |
|---|---|---|---|---|
| Shikkoku no Yami ni Somarishi Utagoe ga Kisama ni mo Kikoeru ka... (漆黒の闇に染まりし歌声が貴様にも聞こえるか…) | 2014 | Released: May 21, 2014; Label: Avex Trax; Formats: CD, digital download | 249 | — |
| Makai no Owari | 2015 | Released: August 26, 2015; Label: Avex Trax; Formats: CD, digital download | 130 | — |
"—" denotes releases that did not chart or were not released in that region.

=== Singles ===
List of singles, with selected chart positions, sales figures and certifications
| Title | Year | Peak chart positions | Sales | Album |
| Title | Year | JPN | Sales | Album |
|---|---|---|---|---|
| "Shinryaku Pikarin Densetsu" (侵略ぴかりん伝説☆) | 2012 | 57 | — | Shikkoku no Yami ni Somarishi Utagoe ga Kisama ni mo Kikoeru ka... |
| "Toro Amachu" (とろあまちゅ) | 2013 | 75 | — | Shikkoku no Yami ni Somarishi Utagoe ga Kisama ni mo Kikoeru ka... |
| "Makai Shinjū" (魔界心中) / "Mitsu to Batsu" | 2016 | 17 | — | Non-album single |
| "Ba-Ba-Bah-Ba-Baumkuchen" (バババーババウムクーヘン★) / "Geboku Gebo Gebo!" (下僕GEBO GEBO!) | 2017 | 17 | — | Non-album single |
| "Fukanzen na Boku to Kanseisareta Kaisha" (不完全な僕と完成された社会) | 2018 | 23 | — | Non-album single |
"—" denotes releases that did not chart or were not released in that region.

==== Promotional singles ====
List of singles, with selected chart positions, sales figures and certifications
| Title | Year | Peak chart positions | Sales | Album |
| Title | Year | JPN | Sales | Album |
|---|---|---|---|---|
| "Dogeza Road" (土下座ロード) | 2016 | — | — | Non-album single |
"—" denotes releases that did not chart or were not released in that region.
