= Sayaka Araki =

Japanese fashion model (born 1984)

- 荒木さやか
- Born: December 22, 1984 (age 41); Kyoto Prefecture, Japan
- Other names: Riona Aihara; DJ Alucky
- Occupations: Fashion model; Hostess; Disc jockey
- Years active: Fashion model since age 21; Hostess (age 19 – 23); Disc jockey since 2009
- Known for: Appearing in Koakuma Ageha; Appearing in Ane Ageha

Sayaka Araki (荒木 さやか, Araki Sayaka; born December 22, 1984) is a Japanese fashion model, disc jockey, and businesswoman. She is best known for her stint as a model for the cabaret-gyaru fashion magazine Koakuma Ageha .

She was a major contributor to Koakuma Ageha for 4 years and 10 months, since the magazine's very early days. She left Koakuma Ageha in 2011, and has since become a main model for its sister magazine Ane Ageha.

== Career ==
Araki was born in Kyoto Prefecture, Japan. She lived in Kyoto until she moved to Tokyo to learn makeup art and nail art. She graduated from technical schools specialized in these arts, but entered nightwork at the age of 19 when she began working at a hostess bar.

=== Koakuma Ageha ===
She began fashion modeling at the age of 21 after being approached to model by Koakuma Ageha's editorial board in 2005 when she was a hostess at a Kabukicho hostess bar. Araki moved to Roppongi in 2006 and began working at Roppongi hostess bar R, under her new genji name "Riona Aihara". She had since worked for R by 2008 when she retired from the nightwork. Her "graduation from the night" was featured in Koakuma Ageha for the November 2008 issue.

=== Outside Koakuma Ageha ===
Araki started a professional career as a disc jockey under the stage name "DJ Alucky" (DJ A☆LUCKY), releasing a CD in 2009 when she also launched her own fashion brand "GRS". She began performing at various night clubs all over Japan, and even made a collaboration with Tetsuya Komuro, at Avex's 2009 house music event House Nation Fiesta where the attendees included May J., Tomoyuki Tanaka, Yasutaka Nakata, Ami Suzuki, Shanadoo, Maynard Plant, among others.

She then established her own commercial building, "Girl's Factory Dot", in 2009 in Shibuya. "Girl's Factory Dot" launched as a 3-story building, where all the floors were dedicated to her own fashion brand GRS. She also released her first book, a photo-essay book Alucky Style (A☆LUCKY STYLE), in 2009.

Araki left Koakuma Ageha with her last appearance in the March 2011 issue, moving to its sister magazine Ane Ageha.

== Nightwork ==
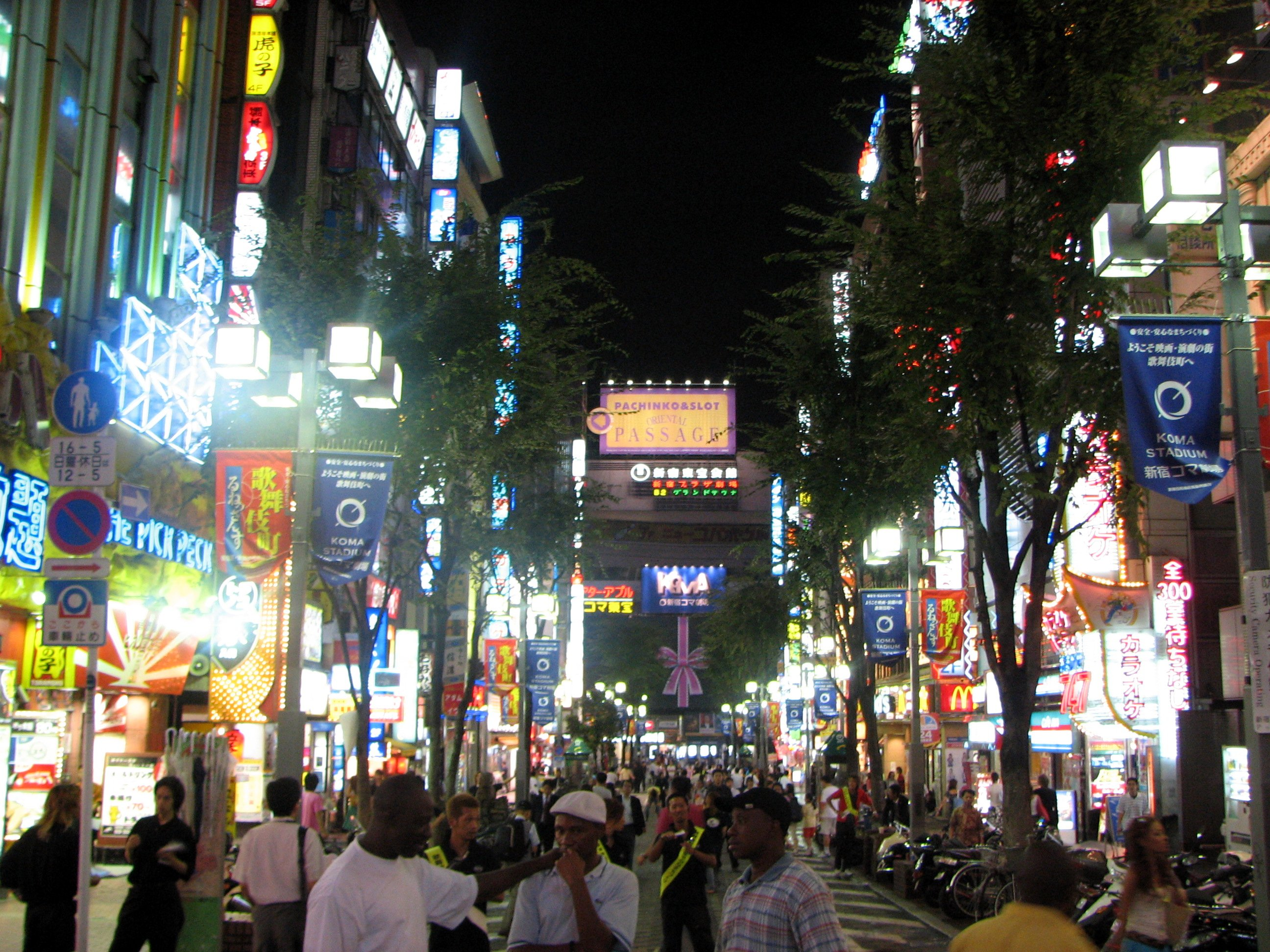
Kabukicho, Shinjuku, Tokyo

Araki engaged in nightwork for about 4 years from the age of 19 through to 23.

Her first workplace was a hostess bar in Kabukicho, Shinjuku, Tokyo, where she got the genji name of "Riko" (リコ). At that time, the city was at the twilight of an era of "loan shark bubble". She rose to one of the highest-ranked hostesses within 2 or 3 months, and finally to the second-ranked one, at the bar where most customers were "overly-rich guys" involving in the illegal business. She began appearing in the Koakuma Ageha magazine at this time.

Araki left the bar and after spending about six months outside the nightwork, she returned to Shinkuku at the age of 20 to work at another Kabukicho hostess bar, where she got the genji name of "Riona Aihara" (愛原リオナ). She rose to the top hostess at the bar and worked for the bar until she moved to Roppongi to work at R, a newly opened Roppongi hostess bar where she was hired as the "face". She had since worked at the Roppongi bar for two years.

Araki retired from the nightwork at the age of 23. Koakuma Ageha featured her retirement from the nightwork with its special editorial titled "Goodbye R Sayaka, Saying Goodbye to the Night!! Let's fight with the Daylight!!!" (さよならRさやか、夜上がります!!昼職人生、いざ勝負!!!).

Ew! Ew! Ew!, but hey, still drink.

オエッ、オエッ、オエッ、でも飲むんだよ。

— Sayaka Araki reminiscing about her days as a hostess,
quoted by Koakuma Ageha as quipping.

== Notable appearances ==
=== Magazines ===
- Ane Ageha
- Koakuma Ageha, 2005 – 2011
- Oneh-san ni Natta!!! Koakuma Ageha×Happie Nuts×I Love Mama, a special edition by Koakuma Ageha and Happie Nuts and I Love Mama, published in November 2010, on the cover with Keiko

=== Music videos ===
- "Eternal", by Jemstone, released in April 2009, with Shizuka Mutoh
- "Tasuki", by Wakadanna, released in October 2011, with Mai Hirose, Yayoi Nemoto, Azusa Koizumi, Natsumi Saito, Yui Minemura, and Satomi Yakuwa

=== Others ===
- Video game: Yakuza 3, released in February 2009 by Sega. Also on the cover of Kamutai Magazine with fellow Koakuma Ageha models Rina Sakurai and Shizuka Mutoh
- Runway: Shibuya Girls Collection '09 S/S
- Record jacket: "Koakuma Heaven", released in June 2009, by Gackt, with Sayo Hayakawa among others
- Event: Sea Rize Rock 09×Nadesicollection09, held in December 2009 in Kitakyushu, Fukuoka, with Rina Sakurai, Shizuka Mutoh, Mika Kagoshima, Kumiko Funayama, Yui Kanno, Hiromi Hosoi, Kanako Kawabata, Maiko Takahashi, Yuki Yamamoto, Mai Miyagi, and Aya Suzuki
- Website: "Model Closet", founded in February 2010, with Arikkuma, Ikemegu, Shiori Ikeda, Rumi Itahashi, Risa Ichikura, Saeko Ogawa, Azusa Hondo, Asuka Kimura, Erika Koda, Sakurina, Nazumi Sato, Miyo Takizawa, Yuka Ninomiya, Aya Hoshi, Noritae, and Shizuka Mutoh

== Discography ==
- DJ Alucky House Mix Vol.1 (DJ A☆LUCKY HOUSE MIX Vol.1), released in March 2009. It featured songs by Lauryn Hill, Wyclef Jean, Amy Winehouse, among others, mixed by Araki, as well as her original tracks. Araki's original track "Take a Step" debuted at the top of the weekly RecoChoku chaku-uta chart.
- Kiss You Kiss Me : Hearty Mix (KISS YOU KISS ME 〜Hearty Mix〜), released in February 2010. It is a non-stop mix album.
