= Sumire (model) =

Japanese model (1987–2009)

Sumire 純恋
- Born: July 28, 1987; Isawa, Iwate, Japan
- Died: June 11, 2009 (aged 21); Tokyo, Japan
- Occupations: Fashion model; Cabaret hostess
- Known for: Appearing in Koakuma Ageha

Arisa Ishikawa (石川 安里沙, Ishikawa Arisa; July 28, 1987 – June 11, 2009), better known by her stage name Sumire (純恋), was a Japanese cabaret hostess and fashion model, who was known as a featured model on the popular gyaru fashion magazine Koakuma Ageha.

== Early life and education ==
Born in Isawa, Iwate, Sumire grew up the child of a single mother in a small town. While in high school she dreamed of becoming a fashion designer.

== Career ==
After high school, she began working as a hostess at a Sendai hostess club, in order to raise the money she needed to start her career in fashion design. She took her genji name "Sumire" from Shonan no Kaze's 2006 single "Junrenka" (純恋歌), immediately becoming a successful hostess at the club until, at the age of 20, she was approached by Koakuma Ageha's editor in the club about modeling. She then began to appear in the magazine as a model.

Sumire immediately gained enormous popularity among Ageha readers and began modeling for the non-Ageha scenes such as the Sendai Collection show. She moved to Tokyo in March 2009 to pursue modeling and her real dream of becoming a fashion designer. She launched her own fashion brand named "Divas" while working as a model. On June 10, 2009, when Gackt's single "Koakuma Heaven" was released, its cover featured Sumire along with other Ageha models such as Sayaka Araki and Sayo Hayakawa.

== Death ==
On June 11, 2009, Sumire was found dead at age 21 in her condominium by her agency's staff. Prior to her death she had complained of headaches, and the cause of death was later determined to be due to a brain hemorrhage.

== Legacy ==
Sumire was well known for her charity work for children in need. She began doing charity work when she was a middle school girl, and her charity work had become more active since early 2009 when she joined the Japan Welfare Children and Families Association after she found out that fellow model(s) had donated money to the association. She donated all the profits from the necklace which she designed and released on the Fancy & Co accessory company, and attended several charity events related to children with incurable diseases in May.

After her death, her friends and fellow models founded a charity organization, "H=and Project", with the concept of "succeeding Sumire's willingness". "H=and Project" consists of numerous fashion models and has provided help mainly to children with incurable diseases or disabilities, poverty-stricken children outside Japan (South Africa in particular), and sometimes to the likes of environmental projects and animal welfare projects.
