= Businesses Affecting Public Morals Regulation Act =

Law in Japan

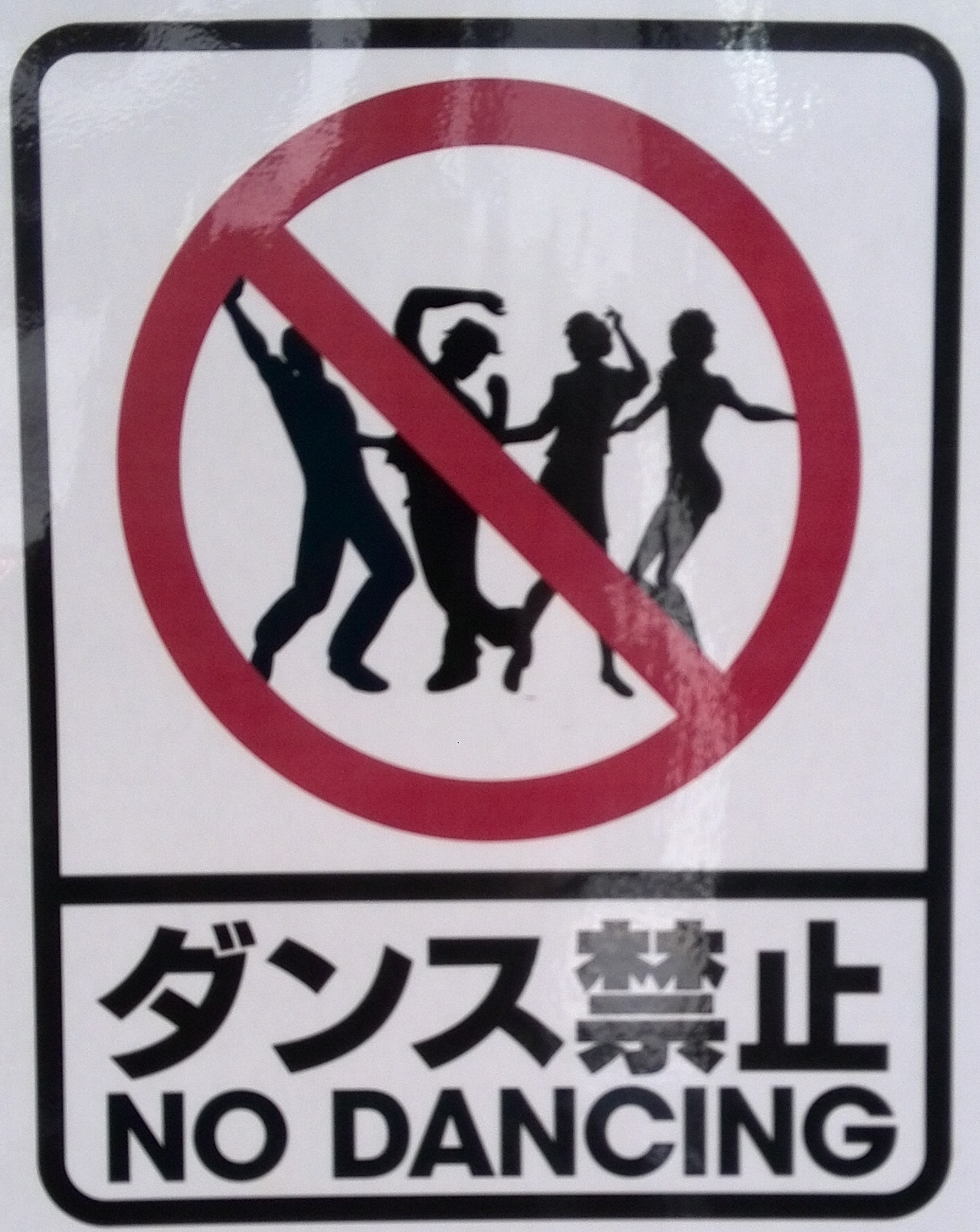
"No dancing" sign in a bar in Tokyo

The Businesses Affecting Public Morals Regulation Law (風俗営業等の規制及び業務の適正化等に関する法律, Fūzoku eigyō tō no kisei oyobi gyōmu no tekiseika tō ni kansuru hōritsu), also known as 風俗営業取締法 (Fūzoku eigyō torishimari hō) or 風営法 (Fūeihō), is a law that regulates entertainment places in Japan.

== History ==
- 1948: Creation of the law.
- April 1, 1959: Name change.
- August 14, 1984: Extension to some businesses before midnight.
- April 1998: Extension to some massage businesses and adult videos transmission by Internet.
- November 2005: Penal regulation enforcement, various new rules.
- October 2014: Regulations on dancing are lifted.
- January 2015: Proposition to relax the law is rejected.
- Effective 2016 the law will be relaxed, allowing permits for exceptions as long as certain conditions are met including lighting and not operating near residential areas.

== Targets ==
=== Businesses offering food and entertainment ===
- Category 1: Japanese cabaret.
- Category 2: Kyabakura (hostess bar).
- Category 3: Business where customers can eat and dance.
- Category 4: Dance hall.
  - At first this covered dance schools too. Dance schools were removed from this category in 1998 after the movie Shall We Dance? made ballroom dance popular.
- Category 5: Bar.
- Category 6: Mahjong and pachinko parlor.
- Category 7: Amusement arcade.

=== Sex industry ===
- Within a local
  - Category 1: Soapland.
  - Category 2: Fashion health.
  - Category 3: Striptease theater, Adult movie theater.
  - Category 4: Love hotel.
  - Category 5: Sex shop, Adult video arcade.
  - Category 6: Members-only bar for meeting persons of the opposite sex. This category was created on January 1, 2011.
- Without a local
  - Category 1: Delivery health (call girl).
  - Category 2: Pornography mail order.
- Others
  - Pornography video by Internet, brothel selection websites.
  - Telekura.
  - Telekura operated from home, for instance using a cellular telephone.

=== Businesses selling alcohol after midnight ===
Selling alcohol after midnight requires a permission. Also, after 10pm family restaurants must refuse non-accompanied people under 18 years old.

== Authorization ==
Business in the "Businesses offering food and entertainment" class require an authorization from the prefecture's public safety commission.

Business in the "Sex industry" and "Businesses selling alcohol after midnight" classes do not require an authorization, but require a notification.

== Consequence on nightclubs ==
Dance used to be forbidden in nightclubs with dancefloors smaller than 66 square meters, or nightclubs that operate after 1am (midnight in some areas). While this rule has been mostly ignored for 50 years, around 2011 it started to be enforced by the police in Osaka, Fukuoka and Tokyo. This led most nightclubs to display "No Dancing" signs, and some employed security personnel to actually prevent customers from dancing.

In 2013, organization Let's Dance submitted a petition signed by 155,879 people to the National Diet, demanding that the part of the law regulating dancing be updated. Let's Dance has a sub-group called Dance Lawyers.

The cabinet agreed to lift the ban on dancing in October 2014. Some have speculated this was in view of the 2020 Summer Olympics.

== See also ==
- Prostitution Prevention Law
