= Shion (singer) =

Zainichi Korean musician

Shion 詩音
- Born: Yu-hyang Park (朴有香); Yokohama, Kanagawa
- Genre: R&B
- Occupations: Singer; songwriter
- Years active: 2004–present

Yu-hyang Park (朴有香, Boku Yūka), better known as Shion (詩音, meaning "lyrics-sound"), is a Japanese-born Korean R&B singer, who has been active since mid-2000s. Originally from the underground club scene, she has achieved widespread success in the mainstream J-pop scene since 2008. Her debut album Candy Girl (2008) was the first indie-album to reach the top 10 of the Oricon album chart.

== Career ==
=== Early life ===
Born in Yokohama with South Korean nationality, she grew up with her parents who were owners of a shot bar and during her childhood she had always been close to black music sounds such as ones by Marvin Gaye and Diana Ross that were often aired in the bar. She began voice training at the age of 10 and later stayed in Detroit, United States, training under Keith John, a long time backing vocalist for Stevie Wonder. She entered the Yokosuka club scene, signing with an indie record label in 2004. One of her early notable works was to be featured by Sendai-based hip hop band LGY in their 2006 album Jointed 2 Homies.

=== Break ===
She released her first album Candy Girl on May 28, 2008, and it debuted at No. 9 on the Oricon album chart. Candy Girl was issued on an indie label, and it was the first indie-album in the history of the Oricon album chart to hit the top-10 spots.

She then released her first single, Last Song, in August of that year and second single, Rain of Tearz / Girlicious feat. DJ☆GO, in April 2009. Rain of Tearz / Girlicious feat. DJ☆GO debuted at No. 6 on the Oricon singles chart.

Her second album w/z Friendz peaked at No. 11 and third album Truth peaked at No. 7 on the Oricon album chart.

=== Arrest ===
On December 10, 2009, she was arrested for possession of various illegal drugs including ketamine. She confessed all the charges against her such as using the drugs she possessed, receiving a suspended 1-year jail sentence (in February 2010). She further revealed in the trial that she had attempted to commit suicide since October 2009.

=== Comeback ===
After three years absence, in July 2012, Shion released a song, "Distance", with a music video featuring model Hozunyam. In 2013, she made a surprise appearance in the Koakuma Ageha fashion magazine, as one of the issue's special guests along with Gackt and one other man, getting interviewed by Emiri Aizawa. She covered hide's song "Hurry Go Round" for Tribute VI -Female Spirits-, released on December 18, 2013.

== Discography ==
=== Albums ===
Year	Details	Chart positions	Ref.
Year	Details	JP	Ref.
2008	Candy Girl Released: May 28, 2008	9	
2008	w/z Friendz Released: October 29, 2008	11	
2009	Truth Released: October 7, 2009	7	

=== Singles ===
Year	Details	Chart positions	Ref.
Year	Details	JP	Ref.
2008	Last Song Released: August 22, 2008	36	
2009	Rain of Tearz Released: April 8, 2009	6	
2009	Luv / Summer Time Luv Released: July 29, 2009	16	
2012	Distance Released: July 11, 2012	—	
"—" denotes releases that did not chart or were not released in that region.

== Filmography ==
=== Television shows ===
Year	Title	Network	Role	Notes	Ref.
2022	Singforest	SBS	Cast		
