= Sweet Song =

Single by Lady Bird feat. Son'i (from Popteen)
- Released: February 25, 2009
- Genre: Dance; J-pop
- Length: 30 min
- Label: BMG Japan
- Songwriters: DJ Ten & Kazuhisa Hirota

"Sweet Song" is a single released in early 2009 by "Lady Bird feat. Son'i (from Popteen)"; Lady Bird, a dance music duo consisting of DJ Ten and producer Kazuhisa Hirota, and fashion model Wei Son.

== Background ==
The main track "Sweet Song" had been a popular song in the Shibuya club scene and originally performed by another singer in Club Atom, a disco where DJ Ten had been scratching. DJ Ten and Kazuhisa Hirota formed Lady Bird in late 2007 and auditioned many female vocalists for "Sweet Song"'s major release, before meeting Wei Son, a fashion model who had appeared on the Popteen magazine.

== Releases ==
Lady Bird and Wei Son first released "Sweet Song" as a chaku-uta (ringtone song) on December 1, 2008 with the name "Sweet Song feat. XXX (from Popteen)". "Sweet Song feat. XXX (from Popteen)" reached the top-20 on the Dwango chaku-uta chart by December 26, 2008, before the singer's name was revealed to be Son'i (Wei Son).

The CD, "Sweet Song", was released on February 25, 2009, with six tracks; "Sweet Song", "Bitter Chocolate", "Sweet Song (DJ Kaya Remix)", "Sweet Song (Lady Bird Club Mix)", "Sweet Song (Inst)", and "Bitter Chocolate (Inst)". "Sweet Song" appeared on the Oricon singles chart 3 times, peaking at #47.

== Tracks ==
"Sweet Song"
No.	Title	Length
1.	"Sweet Song"	4:56
2.	"Bitter Chocolate"	3:54
3.	"Sweet Song (DJ Kaya Remix)"	5:27
4.	"Sweet Song (Lady Bird Club Mix)"	6:13
5.	"Sweet Song (Inst)"	4:56
6.	"Bitter Chocolate (Inst)"	3:55

"Sweet Song" was later included in Lady Bird's first album STYLiST, and track #3, "Sweet Song (DJ Kaya Remix)", was featured in Dancemania's Hime Trance 4.
