= I Love Mama =

Japanese fashion and lifestyle magazine

- January 2012 — From left to right:Mariko Mizuno (age 28, in the last month of her pregnancy); Yumiko Idogawa (age 24, nine-months pregnant); Yuhmi Sugiyama (age 21, eight-months pregnant)
- Chief editor: Ayako Yamashita
- Categories: Fashion, Lifestyle
- Frequency: Monthly
- Circulation: 200,000
- Publisher: Inforest
- First issue: September 2008
- Final issue: 2014
- Country: Japan
- Language: Japanese

I Love Mama (stylized "I LOVE mama") was a gyaru fashion and lifestyle magazine published monthly in Japan by Inforest Publishing.

Originally named "Mama Nuts × Ageha", I Love Mama was established as a special edition of two gyaru magazines, the hostess-targeted Koakuma Ageha magazine and dark-skin obsessed Happie Nuts magazine.

I Love Mama was considered a unique magazine, as it was a magazine especially for "gyaru-mama", women who remain gyaru after pregnancy, consisting of the likes of housekeeping tips, parenting tips, and fashion tips.

Described as a "mega-hit" magazine, it has been the highest-selling gyaru-mama magazine ever since its launch in 2008.

== History ==
I Love Mama was first published in September 2008 under the name "Mama Nuts × Ageha" as a special co-edition of Koakuma Ageha and Happie Nuts, after these two magazines' special editorials for "gyaru-mama" audiences gained considerable popularity. Mama Nuts × Ageha was the first-ever magazine devoted solely to the gyaru-mama scene, and it became a smash-hit, with 150,000 copies sold during its first three days and an additional 30,000 copies sold. Mama Nuts × Ageha changed its name to "I Love Mama", becoming monthly in April 2009. Circulation reached 200,000 by October 2009.

Following the closure of Inforest Publishing I Love Mama ended publication in 2014.

== Models ==
The most notable trait of the models appearing in I Love Mama is that most of them appear in the magazine with their children. The children in the magazine are called the "chibiko".

Exclusive models are officially called the "Love-mo". Irregularly-appearing models are officially called the "Love-mama".

Model and her "chibiko"s on the cover of a 2011 issue

- "Love-mo" : Ako Hina, Chika Kiguchi, Satomi Daikuhara, Hanako Noda, Yukari Shirai, Saori Nakamoto, Chika Arai, Kyo Son (the actual twin sister of fashion model Wei Son), Ayaka Shirato
- "Love-mama" : Maho Ohshiro, Ayane Kubo, Saki Kawabata, Yukari Nakatsu, Akari Suzuki, Ai Hotta, Mariko Mizuno, Naho Mishima, Hiromi Sayama

== External ==
- Official (in Japanese)
- Official (Inforest) (in Japanese)
