= Miyawaki =

Miyawaki (Japanese: 宮脇) is a Japanese surname. Notable people with the surname include:

- Akira Miyawaki (1928–2021), Japanese botanist
- Karin Miyawaki (宮脇 花綸; born 1997), Japanese fencer
- Sakura Miyawaki (born 1998), Japanese and Korean pop idol
- Shion Miyawaki (born 1990), Japanese pop singer
- Miyawaki (wrestler) (born 1977), Japanese professional wrestler
- Mitski Miyawaki (born 1990), American singer-songwriter
