= Wei Son =

Japanese fashion model (born 1989)

- Born: October 13, 1989 (age 36); Dalian, People's Republic of China
- Occupation: Fashion model
- Modeling information
- Height: 1.70 m (5 ft 7 in)

Wei Son (孫 暐, Son Ii; born October 13, 1989) is a Japanese fashion model who has been active in both the professional and commercial modeling fields since the late 2000s. She is particularly known in the gyaru scene, as a former major contributor to the Popteen magazine and an exclusive model for its sister magazine PopSister. There are several different ways of spelling her name in Roman script, including Ii Son, Wei Sun, and Wei Son.

== Early life ==
According to her official profile, Son was born in Saitama, Japan with Chinese nationality, however she herself has stated on multiple occasions that she was born in Dalian, China and lived there until she was 5 years old before immigrating to Niigata and growing up in Saitama. She became a full-time model at the age of 17.

== Modeling ==
She first appeared in the Popteen magazine in May 2007 and was first on its cover in March 2008.

In April 2010 when Popteen's "older sister" magazine PopSister was first published, she appeared on it as an exclusive model alongside six other exclusive models. That same year she went to Shanghai to attend the Shanghai World Expo, specifically its event promoting the gyaru culture and various gyaru-brands, as a representative of the gyaru scene along with eight other Japanese models related to the Popteen magazine. Being very active in the runway scene, she has endorsed numerous fashion brands, cosmetic products, and several non-fashion / non-cosmetic products including printclub machines. She also starred in the music video for Rake's 2010 song "All I Need Is...".

PopSister ceased publication in September 2011. She had since appeared on various fashion magazines including the 250,000-selling Blenda magazine, and she began appearing regularly on Blenda as the youngest one of its faces in April 2012.

=== On TV ===
Son has been appearing regularly on TV Tokyo's street dance themed program Dance@TV since April 2010 as its only female host. She also began appearing on MTV Japan's Shibuhara Girls in January 2011 as one of its four regulars. A reality TV series, Shibuhara Girls has reported some daily aspects of her modeling life such as her visits to South Korea where she was featured in the Maps street fashion magazine, the Men's Health magazine's "Hot Icon of the Month" monthly special editorial, and several newspapers. In addition to MTV, she contributed to the 2011 large music event "MTV Video Music Awards Japan" as its main host, in which her episodic friendship with the US diva Lady Gaga was later reported.

== Music ==
She made her singing debut in early 2009 when she released her first single "Sweet Song" with Lady Bird, as "Lady Bird feat. Son'i (from Popteen)" on BMG Japan. Officially released on February 25, 2009, "Sweet Song" hit the top spots of several singles and club charts such as the Dwango chart and Club Atom chart. It appeared on the Oricon singles chart 3 times, peaking at #47.

== Family ==
Wei has a fraternal twin sister named Kyo Son (孫 きょう, Son Kyou). Kyo, who became a mother of a boy in October 2009, is also a model best known for appearing in popular gyaru-mama magazine "I Love Mama". Wei made an appearance with Kyo in the Blenda magazine June 2013 issue, and it was her first magazine appearance with the sister.

== External ==
- Official profile by the LesPros modeling agency (in Japanese)
- Official blog (in Japanese)
- Former official blog (in Japanese)
- Official Twitter (in Japanese)
