= Hozunyam =

Japanese gyaru fashion model

- ほずにゃむ
- Born: Hozumi Numajiri; August 18, 1991 (age 33); Kumagaya, Saitama, Japan
- Monuments: Ota Station
- Occupation(s): Fashion model, hostess
- Known for: Appearing in Koakuma Ageha

Hozumi Numajiri (沼尻 帆泉, Numajiri Hozumi, born August 18, 1991), better known as Hozunyam (ほずにゃむ, Hozunyamu), is a Japanese gyaru fashion model. A hostess living in Tokyo, she is best known for appearing in the Koakuma Ageha fashion magazine and, since her 2010 debut in the magazine, has been well known for her real personal story of a romance with her ex-boyfriend, Bara (バラ), an American motorcycle gang leader.

== Career in modeling ==
Hozunyam made her first appearance in the Koakuma Ageha magazine for its August 2010 issue, as a hostess working at "Revju", a hostess bar located in Kabukicho, Shinjuku, Tokyo. She has since appeared irregularly in Koakuma Ageha, and several of other magazines such as Soul Sister, and Men's Knuckle in which she has been voted the most favorite female model. She appeared in a music video for Shion's song, "Distance", released in July 2012.

== Personal life ==
=== Early life ===
Hozunyam was born in Kumagaya, Saitama, Japan, and raised there until she was in 6th grade. Her parents divorced just about the time when she entered middle school. She then moved to her grandmother's home in Isesaki, Gunma, and turned into a yanki delinquent when she was in 8th grade after stopping to attend school due to bullying, as being ignored by all of her classmates. She, however, began studying to pass the entrance examination for a private high school in Gunma, after being attracted by the school's uniform which she found "so cute". She successfully entered the school, and when she reached 16 years old, she began spending most of her time in dissipation in Isesaki's neighboring city Ota, particularly around Ota Station.

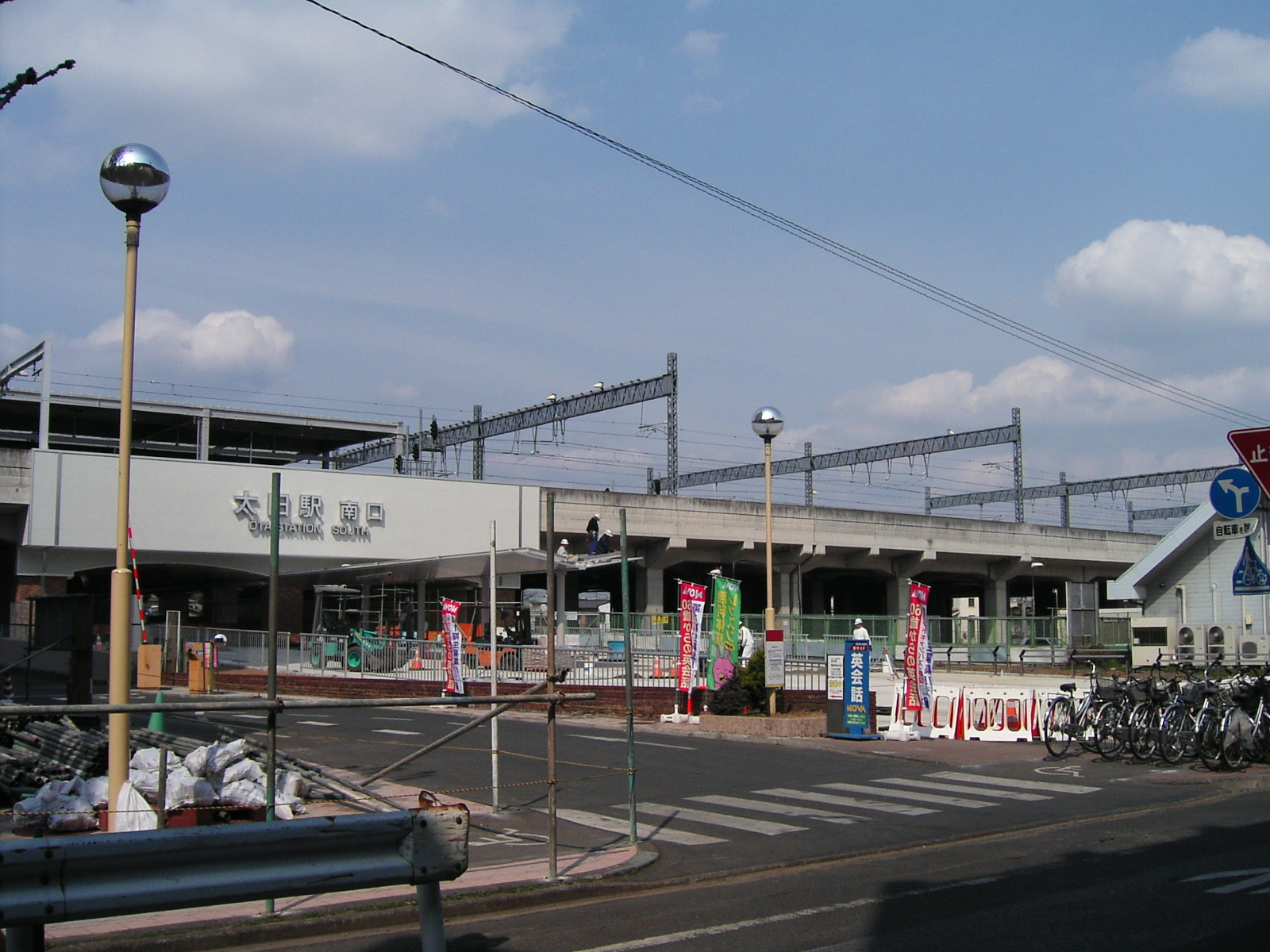
South Gate of Ota Station

=== "Bara" ===
In the summer at the age of 16, Hozunyam had a "fateful encounter" with Bara, an American boy raised in Gunma, who was, at that time, the boss of a traditional Japanese motorcycle gang team named 'Tenro-kai' (天狼会, 天 heaven - 狼 wolf - 会 group) and notorious in Ota's youth-gang scene. She began dating him after his suggestion in a restaurant located in the north gate of Ota Station and had since been hanging out with him and his crew almost every day around the south gate of Ota Station.

After about six months from the beginning of the relationship, she started to cohabit with him and promised to marry him, dropping out of school and getting pregnant. At that time she had already earned the nickname of 'Hozunyam'; the boyfriend had a tattoo of the name, 'Hozunyamu' in Japanese hiragana, just like she had a tattoo depicting a flower meant by 'bara' in Japanese, rose. However, immediately after the pregnancy, the two learned there was a fugitive warrant out for him on various charges. He was arrested while the two were planning to decamp from Ota, getting a total of seven years 'exile' - sentenced to two years in youth prison and deportation for five years to the United States of America.

After the separation, she worked at a Don Quijote store and a clothing store for a short period before being fired, and began working at a hostess bar in Ota at the age of 18.

=== Nightwork ===
Hozunyam immediately became the top-selling hostess at the bar. However she left the bar and moved to Tokyo alone at the age of 19, due to a chronic feud between her and her new boyfriend. She began working at "Revju", a Shinjuku-Kabukicho hostess bar, and after moving to and working at Roppongi hostess bar "R", she returned to Shinjuku. She has since lived in Shinjuku.
