= Love Songs – Koi Uta =

Love Songs -コイウタ-

Studio album by Shion Miyawaki
- Released: September 2, 2009
- Genre: J-pop
- Label: Rhythm Zone

Shion Miyawaki chronology
Dear (2008)	Love Songs -コイウタ- (2009)

Love Songs – Koi Uta is the second mini-album from Shion Miyawaki under the label Rhythm Zone. This mini-album contains songs that about the experience of Shion in love that were told in the cellphone story KoiUta.

The DVD includes a PV of the song Lovin' You... and a live performance of the song Shinin' Star. Trackmaker AIRI (also known for doing songs for artists like twenty4-7, Maki Goto and Tohoshinki) wrote the song Memories.

== Track listing ==
CD

1. "Loving You…"
2. "Shinin’ Star"
3. "Last Call"
4. "Memories"
5. "Everything Is You" -Makai original mix-

DVD

1. "Loving you…" Music Video
2. "Shinin’ Star" Live Video
