= Dear (Shion Miyawaki album) =

Studio album by Shion Miyawaki
- Released: August 6, 2008
- Genre: J-pop
- Label: Rhythm Zone

Shion Miyawaki chronology
Dear (2007)	Love Songs – Koi Uta (2009)

Dear is the first mini-album from Shion Miyawaki under the label Rhythm Zone. The album failed to chart on the Oricon chart. This mini-album includes a collaboration song with DJ MAKAI.

The DVD includes a PV of the song Flavor and a memorial video of the 1000 CD project which features the song You're Butterfly.

== Track listing ==
CD

1. Flavor
2. You're Butterfly -MAKAI original mix-
3. STORY
4. Soba ni Itai (そばにいたい; Want to be around)
5. Touch Me
6. Flavor feat. BABE.RYOTA(0 SOUL 7) -Longest Summer Groove mix-

DVD

1. Flavor PV
2. You’re Butterfly MEMORIAL MUSIC VIDEO
