= PopSister =

Japanese fashion magazine

- June 2011
- Categories: Fashion
- Frequency: Monthly
- Circulation: 200,000
- Publisher: Kadokawa Haruki Corporation
- First issue: April 17, 2010
- Final issue: November 2011
- Country: Japan
- Based in: Tokyo
- Language: Japanese

PopSister was a Japanese monthly gal-shibuya-kei-oriented fashion magazine published by Kadokawa Haruki Corporationa. Launched in 2010 as the "older sister" magazine of Popteen, PopSister was targeted at females in their teens and early 20s.

== History ==
The original PopSister, titled Scream, was published in 2009 as a special edition of Popteen magazine.

The first authentic issue of PopSister was published on April 17, 2010. It featured seven exclusive models, Tsubasa Masuwaka, Kana Hoshino, Yui Kanno, Jun Komori, Tomoko Higuchi, Eri Aoki, and Wei Son. The last issue was released in November 2011.
