= Gyaruo =

Japanese youth subculture

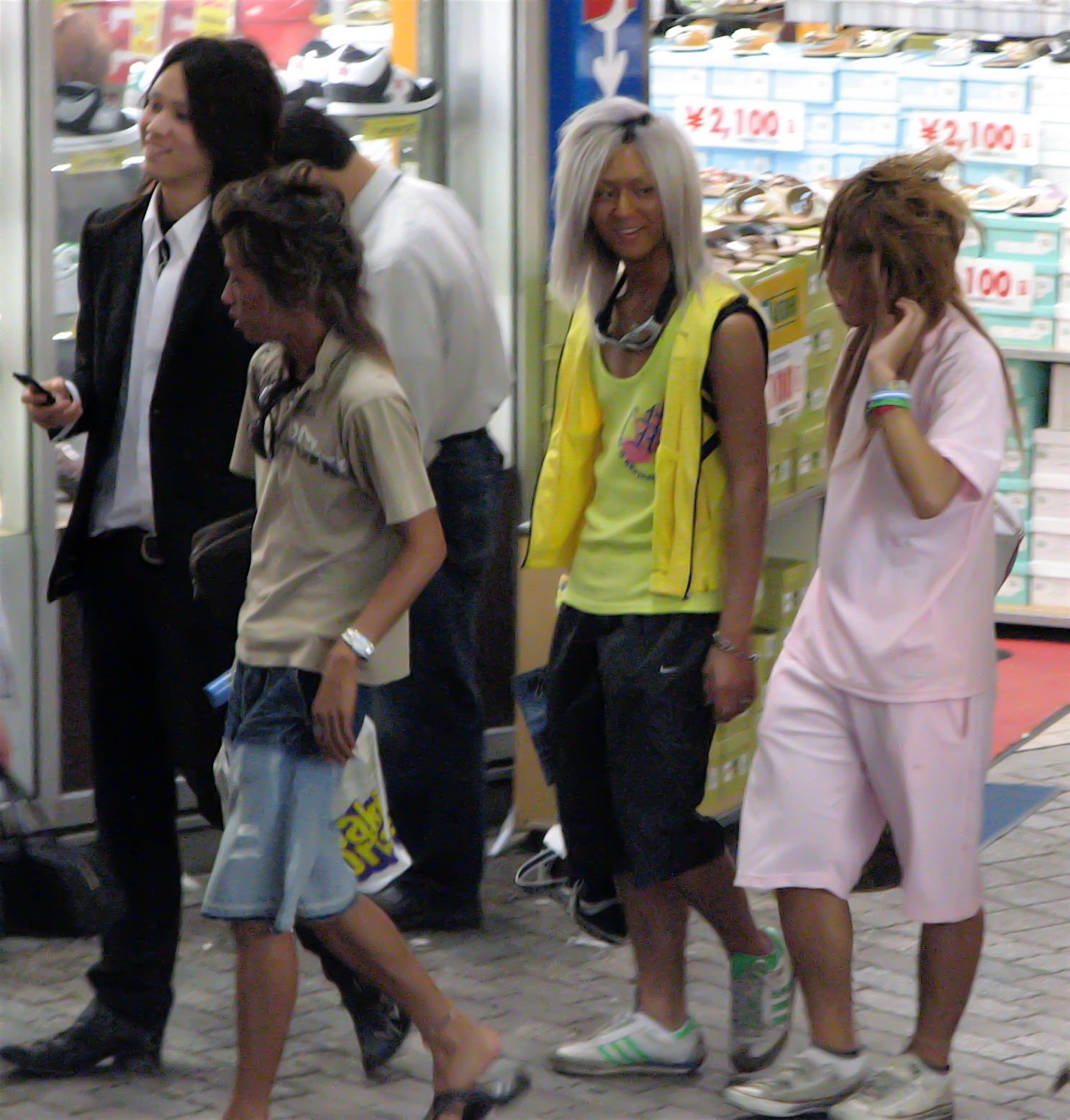
Typical gyaruo in associated dress, 2007.

Gyaruo (which can be written as ギャル男, ギャルオ, ギャル汚 in Japanese) is a sub-group of modern Japanese youth culture. They are the male equivalent of the gyaru. The o suffix added to the word is one reading of the kanji for male (男). The kanji for 'dirty' in Japanese (汚), which also has the same reading, is often used by gyaru and gyaruo in a light hearted way, poking fun at themselves because of the reputation that their subculture has gained within society due to their dark skin, hairstyles and often gritty, rough style of clothing that they wear. Gyaruo are characterised by their deep tans, dyed hair, party lifestyle and a liking for different types of trance music including para-para dancing music, Eurobeat, etc.

== Lifestyle ==
Most major cities in Japan have certain streets or districts within the city centre where gyaruo and gyaru are most likely to be hanging out. Using the two biggest gyaruo culture influencing cities as example: in Tokyo two of the popular places to hang out are around the Shibuya or Shinjuku areas. In Osaka, Amerikamura, which is often shortened to Ame-mura (アメ村), and the Shinsaibashi areas are popular places for gyaruo to hang around.

In 2005, Tokyu Hands opened a second branch of their popular girl's gyaru fashion shopping complex, 109, called 109-②. Two floors of the Shibuya located 109-② store are dedicated to gyaruo brands such as Vanquish, Jack Rose, Varosh, Diavlo, Roi Franc, and Gennaro. The rise in gyaruo fashion has led to openings of other 109-② stores featuring male brands in Fukuoka, Machida, Shizuoka and Nagoya. The 109-② in Shibuya has since been renamed 109-mens, with all floors dedicated to gyaruo fashion instead of the initial two.

== Magazines ==
Gyaruo fashion can be seen in certain magazines such as Men's Egg, "Men's Roses" or Men's Egg Bitter (for gyaruo aged 23+) and a fairly new magazine called Men's Digger. Then there is the popular Men's Knuckle magazine which is aimed at wearers of the more mature looking onii-kei fashion (お兄系), hosts (ホスト) and gyaruo.

Men's Egg is the most popular magazine amongst gyaruo, and is often described as the "gyaruo bible". It is this magazine that has arguably had the largest influence on the development and constant change of gyaruo lifestyle and fashion. Men's Egg magazine which is published monthly, has everything from the latest fashion to articles about the sex lives of the readers. It was this last part that got the magazine a temporary ban by the government, due to complaints by parents and disgruntled traditional politicians who had heard news of the magazines content. Every month this magazine hosts Men's Egg Events at different clubs around Japan keeping its customers entertained by inviting along the magazine's most popular models along to the events to be adored by the excited crowd. The events which are called 'Men's Egg Night', is often shortened to just 'mennai' (メンナイ).

== Fashion ==
Within the gyaruo fashion There are a number of sub fashions, which can be roughly broken down into the following groups:

- Military (ミリタリー系)
- Rock (ロック系)
- Biker (バイカー系)
- American Casual (アメカジ系)
- Surfer (サーファー系)
- Adult (お兄系)

== Reputation ==
Since the gyaruo youth culture sprang up in Japan alongside its female counterpart, it has gained quite a negative reputation with the older members of society and through the media, which has led a lot of people in the Japanese public to look down upon the gyaruo lifestyle due to what they have heard about it, and from what they have learned through the media. Since gyaruo do not fit in with the normal Japanese tradition of blending into the crowd because of their appearance, they are associated with youth rebellion.
