= Kozue Akimoto =

Japanese fashion model

- 秋元 梢
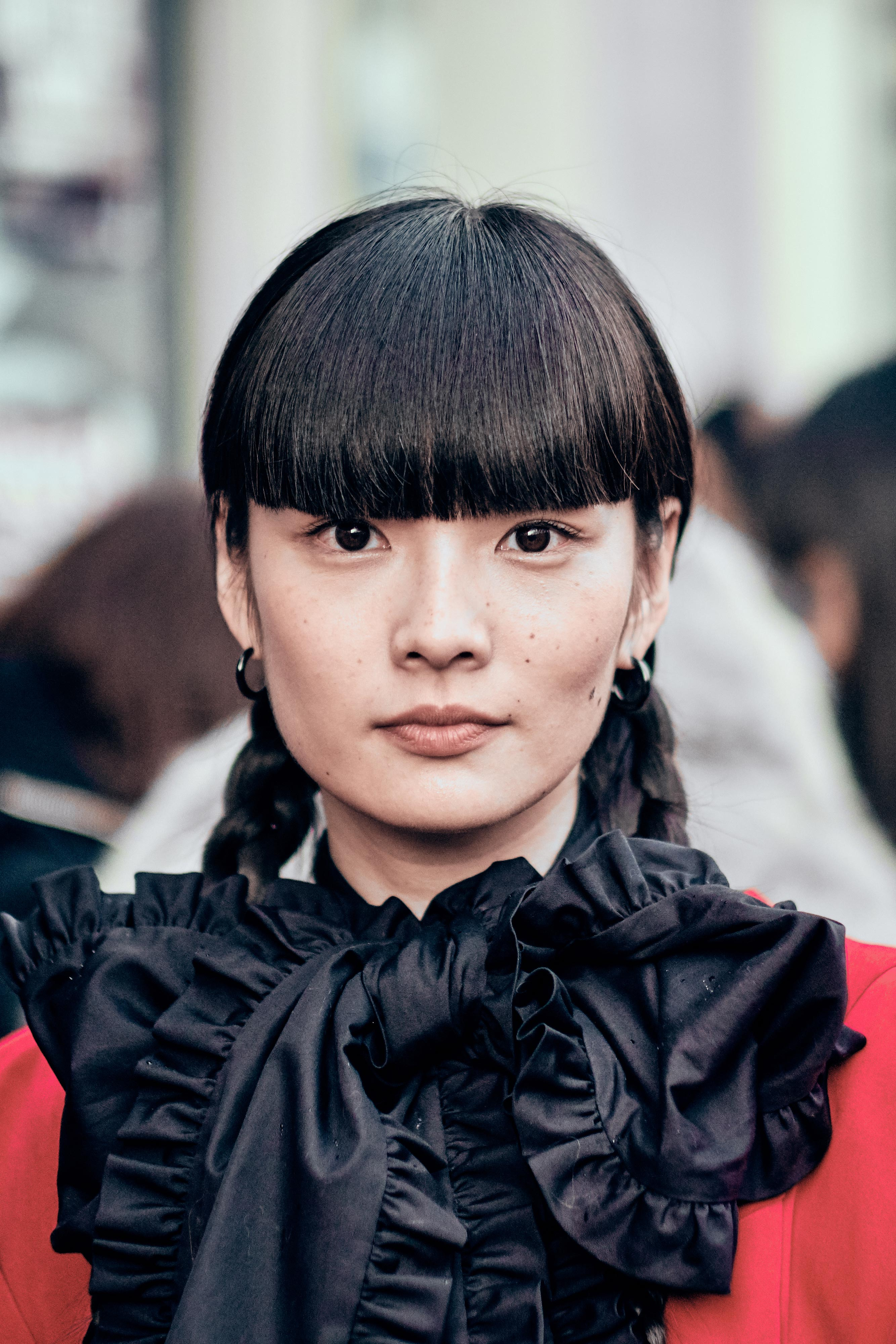
- Born: July 27, 1987 (age 37); Tokyo, Japan
- Occupations: Model; actress
- Agent: LesPros Entertainment
- Height: 1.65 m (5 ft 5 in) (2011)
- Spouse: Shota Matsuda (m. 2018)
- Father: Chiyonofuji Mitsugu
- Relatives: Yūsaku Matsuda (father-in-law); Miyuki Matsuda (mother-in-law); Ryuhei Matsuda (brother-in-law); Yuuki Matsuda (sister-in-law)

Kozue Akimoto (秋元 梢, Akimoto Kozue, born July 27, 1987, in Tokyo, Japan) is a Japanese fashion model represented by LesPros entertainment. Her father was 58th yokozuna Chiyonofuji Mitsugu. Her husband is actor Shota Matsuda.

== Filmography ==
=== TV series ===
Year	Title	Network	Notes	Ref.
2009	The Hills	TV Tokyo		
2011	Shibuhara Girls	MTV Japan		
	Cream Quiz Miracle 9	TV Asahi	Occasional appearances	
2014	Bazooka!!!	BS Sky PerfecTV!		
2015	E TV Judge	NHK E TV	MC	
2015	Quality Hatago	DHC Theater		
2015	This is It!	CTV	MC	

=== Radio series ===
Year	Title	Network	Notes
2014	Tokyo Newedge	J-Wave	
2015	Tokyo District	J-Wave	

=== Magazines ===
Title	Notes
PS	Exclusive model

=== Music videos ===
Year	Title	Notes
2009	Hi Location Markets "Akatsuki"	
2011	Exile Atsushi "Ooo baby"	

=== Advertisements ===
Year	Title	Notes
	Panasonic Mobile Communications SoftBank Mobile	
2013	Suntech Sangyō N.A by Nudyaura	

=== Internet ===
Year	Title	Network	Notes	Ref.
	X Japan Toshl to 4-kai ni Wakete Rensai Taidan	WWS Channel		
2015	"Lunatic Fest. (Tsūshō Luna Fest)" de X Japan Toshl, Luna Sea Sugizo ni Interview Jitsugen	WWS Channel		
