= Lady Bird (duo) =

Japanese dance music crew

Lady Bird (stylized as LADY BiRD) are a dance music production crew from Japan, consisting of two men, DJ Ten (born February 14, 1980), a disc jockey from Hokkaido, and Kazuhisa Hirota (born December 28, 1979), a music producer from Fukuoka.

Lady Bird officially launched in 2007 with two members, DJ Ten, a resident DJ at Club Atom, a disco located in Shibuya, Tokyo, and Kazuhisa Hirota. They released its first album Ten Colors : Interior House in December of that year. Lady Bird then released its first single "Sweet Song" in February 2009 after auditioning many female vocalists and finally choosing fashion model Wei Son. "Sweet Song" appeared on the Oricon singles chart 3 times, peaking at #47.

After releasing two singles "Kitto... Sayonara" and "Tokyo ha Yoru no 7-ji", they released its first full-album STYLiST in August 2010. STYLiST contained several cover songs such as ones by Pizzicato Five and ABBA ("Dancing Queen"), featuring six singers, Yula, Aya Ichinose, Sarah, Liz, Seira Kagami, and Wei Son.
