= Shinin' Star =

Single by Shion Miyawaki
- Released: November 3, 2007
- Genre: J-Pop
- Label: Rhythm Zone

Shion Miyawaki singles chronology
"BOY" (2008)	"Shinin' Star" (2007)	""TBA""

"Shinin' Star" was a 1,000-copy limited single released by artist Shion Miyawaki under label Rhythm Zone. This was part of the Rival Project between the artist Shion Miyawaki and Seara Kojo. The one selling her single the fastest would be the first one to get re-signed at Rhythm Zone and would be the first one to release new material. Shion won this competition.

On 21 April 2009, Shion's official website presented a new arranged version of "Shinin' Star" that would be available for online download on mu-mo on 13 May.

== Track listing ==
1. "Shinin' Star"

== Charts ==
This single was a limited single and could only sell 1,000 copies.

Total reported sales: 1,000
