= Dakota Rose =

American model, fashion blogger, and television personality based in Tokyo, Japan

- Born: Dakota Rose Ostrenga; September 19, 1995 (age 30); Chicago, Illinois, U.S.
- Other name: Kotakoti
- Occupations: Model; blogger; television personality
- Years active: 2012–present
- Agent: Platinum Production
- Height: 165 or 162 cm (5 ft 5 in or 5 ft 4 in)

YouTube information
- Channel: dakotakoti
- Years active: 2011–2019
- Genre: Beauty
- Subscribers: 504 thousand
- Views: 34.5 million
- Last updated: August 4, 2026

Dakota Rose Ostrenga (born September 19, 1995), known professionally as Dakota Rose, is an American model, YouTuber, and television personality based in Tokyo, Japan. Ostrenga achieved early Internet fame by posting make-up tutorials on YouTube in 2011, which went viral in Asia and earned her the nickname "real-life Barbie doll." After gaining attention in Japan, Ostrenga modeled exclusively for the magazine Popteen and also appeared on runways, commercials, and variety shows. She is represented by the Japanese talent agency Platinum Production.

== Early life ==
Dakota Rose Ostrenga was born in Chicago, Illinois to Cathy and Scott Ostrenga. Her siblings include an older brother named Kyler, and an older sister named Kirsten, known as Myspace and Stickam personality Kiki Kannibal. Rose moved to Coral Springs, Florida in 2005 when her father's computer engineering job transferred him there. Throughout the mid 2000s, Ostrenga was active in the scene culture, posting videos on MySpace with Kirsten. Ostrenga's family moved from online harassment before finally settling in her grandmother's house somewhere outside of Orlando, Florida after their house in Coral Springs was foreclosed.

== Career ==
=== 2011–2012: YouTube career ===
Ostrenga joined YouTube in 2011 under the username "dakotakoti" and began posting make-up and styling tutorials, most of which were unvoiced and gave instructions through subtitles. Her videos gained media attention for her doll-like appearance, comparing her to a "living doll." Despite criticisms of digitally altering her appearance, her videos went viral in Asia and were uploaded to Niconico. Ostrenga's make-up tutorials were profiled in Japanese talk and variety shows Gyōretsu no Dekiru Hōritsu Sōdanjo, Pon! and Down Down DX. Media reports nicknamed her the "real-life Barbie doll" and her YouTube channel gained more than 500,000 subscribers, with her videos gaining more than 30 million views.

=== 2012–present: Modeling debut ===
In April 2012, Ostrenga signed with Bravo Models, a Japanese model agency, and moved to Japan. Japanese television program Zip! did a feature segment on Ostrenga, where she personally appeared for the first time. On August 24, 2012, Ostrenga appeared at a launch event of a mascara product at Etude House in Cheongdam-dong, South Korea, and participated in its demonstration showcase. On September 1, 2012, she made her model runway debut in the Tokyo Girls Collection in Nagoya. In April 2013, she also appeared at the Sapporo Collection 2013 show. Later that year, she released her first photobook, All About Dakota Rose. Ostrenga also appeared in the commercial for Rage of Bahamut.

Ostrenga was an exclusive model for the magazine Popteen from the April 2014 issue to the September 2015 issue. She also became the image model for the makeup brand CandyDoll. Ostrenga also modeled for Baby, The Stars Shine Bright and Alice and the Pirates at a promotional event for the online RPG The Tower of Princess.

In 2017, Ostrenga appeared in a commercial for Lotte Fits. She also modeled at the Girls Award 2017 Autumn/Winter show, Fukuoka Asia Collection 10th Anniversary Spring/Summer show, Girls Award 2018 Spring/Summer show, and Toita Fes 2018: Sirius.

== Personal life ==
In 2018, Ostrenga revealed via Instagram that she has leukemia.

== Publications ==
Year	Title	Publisher	ISBN
2013	All About Dakota Rose (ダコタ・ローズのすべて, Dakota Rōzu no Subete)	Takarajimasha	ISBN 978-4-8002-1124-8

== Filmography ==
=== Television ===
Year	Title	Role	Network	Note
2016	Last Kiss: Saigo ni Kiss Suru Date	Herself	TBS	Reality show; partnered with Kohei Mori
2017	Ariyoshi's Meeting For Reviewing	Herself	NTV	Variety show panelist
2019	Rapper ni Kamaretara Rapper ni Naru Drama	Zombie	TV Asahi	—

=== Music video ===
Year	Title	Artist	Note
2017	"Fallin' Snow (Kono Mama Futari de)"	JamFlavor	
