= Yuji (actor) =

Japanese actor and model (born 1987)

- ユージ
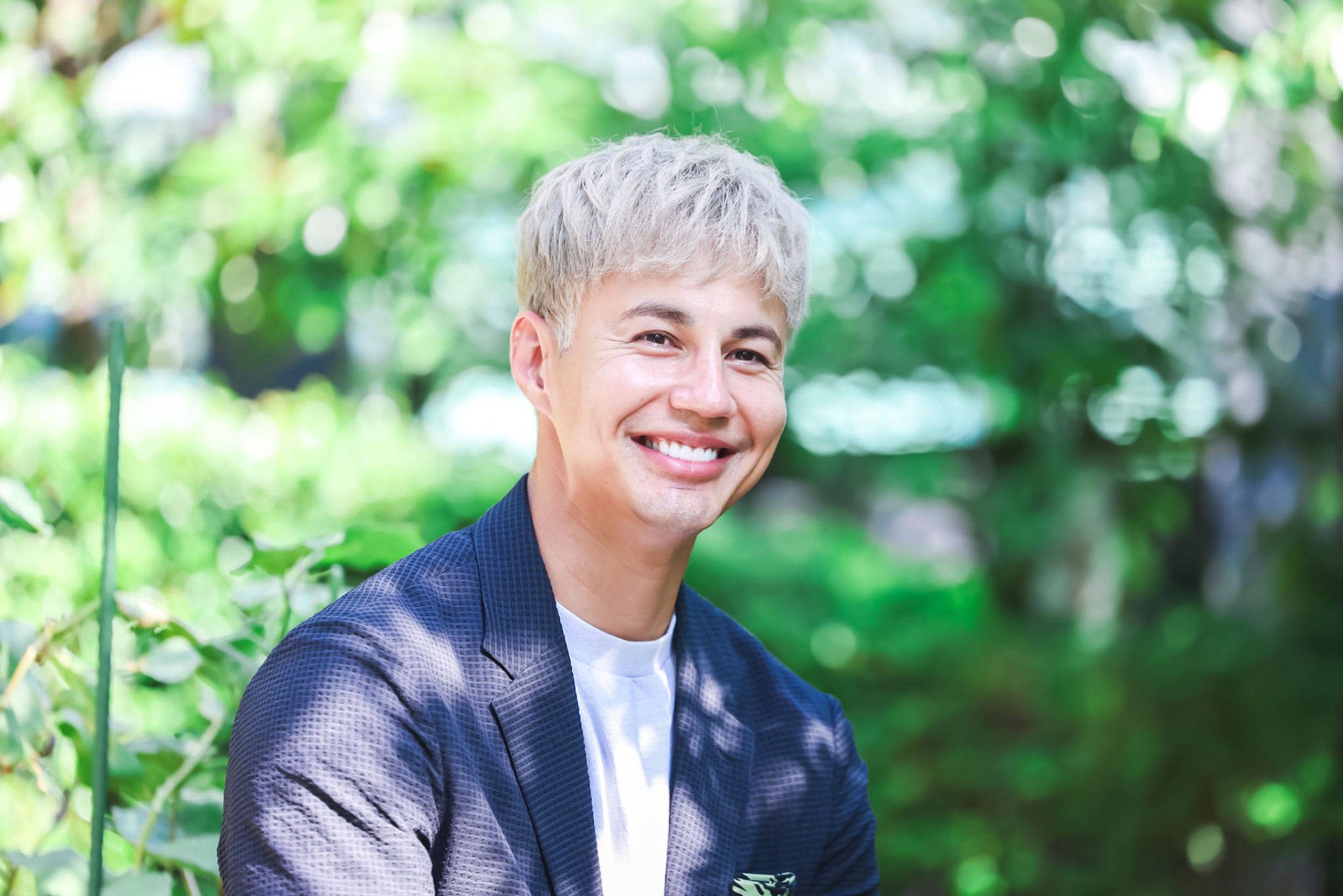
- Thomas Yuji Gordon in 2025
- Born: Thomas Yuji Gordon; September 9, 1987 (age 39); Miami, Florida, United States
- Other names: Yuji Nagai (永井 有司, Nagai Yūji; former stage name)
- Education: Jiyu no Mori Gakuen High School
- Occupations: Actor, entertainer, model
- Agent: LesPros Entertainment
- Height: 1.85 m (6 ft 1 in) (2008)
- Children: 4
- Relatives: Michael Gordon (father); Antonio Guzmán Fernández (great-grandfather)

Thomas Yuji Gordon (トーマス・ユージ・ゴードン, Tōmasu Yūji Gōdon; born September 9, 1987 in Miami, Florida, United States), better known as Yuji (ユージ, Yūji), is a Japanese actor, entertainer, and model who is represented by LesPros Entertainment.

Yuji graduated from Jiyu no Mori Gakuen High School.

== Filmography ==
=== TV series ===
Year	Title	Network	Notes	Ref.
	Toki Meke! Week Wonder	Fuji TV	Every other week	
2011	Shikaku Habataku	NHK E TV	Regular guest in June	
	Ebina-san-ka no Cha Bu-dai	TBS		
	Screen	Mighty Vision	Irregular appearances	
	Sanma's Karakuri-TV	TBS	Irregular appearances	
	Akko ni Omakase!	TBS	Quasi-regular appearances	
	Home Coming	TBS	Quasi-regular appearances	
	Asaichi	NHK G TV	Quasi-regular Thursday appearances in "Japa-navi"	
	Mezase! Gourmet Stars	NHK BS Premium	Quasi-regular appearances	
2015	Suiensaa	NHK E TV	MC	
2015	Shumi no Engei ya Sai no Jikan	NHK E TV		
	Tamori Club	TV Asahi	Irregular appearances	

=== Dramas ===
Year	Title	Role	Network	Notes	Ref.
2004	Deep Love		TV Tokyo		
2005	Nobuta wo Produce		NTV		
2008	Gokusen	Yuji Yamamoto	NTV		
2008	Giragira	Ken	ABC, TV Asahi		
2011	Shibuhara Girls		MTV Japan		
2012	Single Mothers	Yosuke Kogure	NHK G TV		

=== Films ===
Year	Title	Role	Notes	Ref.
2002	Bright Future	Makoto		
2009	Rookies: Graduation	Futako Tamagawa Gakuen High School student		
2009	Gokusen: The Movie			
