= Hiromi (model) =

Japanese DJ and fashion model (born 1990)

- Born: Hiromi Shinhata; March 21, 1990 (age 36); Philippines
- Occupations: Model, DJ
- Years active: 2005–present
- Modeling information
- Hair color: Blonde
- Website: ameblo.jp/hiromishinhata321/

Hiromi Shinhata (新畑 博美, Shinhata Hiromi; born March 21, 1990 in the Philippines), better known simply as Hiromi, is a Japanese fashion model who has been active in the professional and commercial modeling fields since the late 2000s. Formerly a popular model for the Egg magazine, she is known for her androgynous looks and is particularly known in the gal scene.

== Biography ==
=== Modeling ===
She modeled for the Egg magazine during the years 2005 through 2007 and began appearing on the Happie Nuts magazine in late 2007.

Her notable works include appearing on the Happie Nuts magazine and endorsing 109-2, the men's line of the 109 brand. She has signed advertising contracts with several products and brands such as Jungle Beat, M.A.C's Japanese branch, and the third issue of the Buchiage Trance series of trance compilation albums.

=== Music ===
Aside from modeling, she has worked as an exclusive disc jockey for girls-duo Lil'B. She has released several psy trance CDs since 2007, under the alias of "DJ Reika", such as Psy-Trance Queen and Psy-Trance Queen Vol.2: Hagane.

=== Personal life ===
Hiromi is an out lesbian. She publicly acknowledged her homosexuality, which she had kept hidden for a long time, in the April, 2011 issue of the Happie Nuts magazine. In 2011, she revealed that she was dating a female model named Aura.

== External ==
- Official blog powered by Ameba (in Japanese)
- Official Twitter (in Japanese)
- Profile by Shibuya Girls Collection (in Japanese)
- Profile by Casting.net (in Japanese)
