= Boy (Shion Miyawaki song) =

"BOY"

Single by Shion Miyawaki
- Released: July 25, 2007
- Genre: J-Pop
- Label: Rhythm Zone

Shion Miyawaki singles chronology
"BOY" (2007)	"'Shinin' Star'" (2007)

Alternative Cover
- CD + DVD

"BOY" is the first single Shion Miyawaki released under label Rhythm Zone. This single charted on the Oricon ranking on the #182 place and sold 507 copies in its first week.

== Track listing ==
=== CD ===
1. BOY
2. Bluff
3. BOY (instrumental)
4. Bluff (instrumental)

=== DVD ===
1. BOY PV
2. BOY Making Clip
3. ザ・ライバルTV Promotion Clip

== Charts ==
Mon	Tue	Wed	Thu	Fri	Sat	Sun	Week Rank	Sales
x	x	x	x	x	x	x	182	507

Total Reported Sales: 507
