= Ayana Tsubaki =

Japanese TV personality and fashion model (born 1984)

- 椿 彩奈
- Born: July 15, 1984 (age 42); Saitama, Japan
- Education: Aoyama Gakuin University
- Occupations: TV personality; fashion model; professional mahjong player

Yuri Nakamura (中村 有里, Nakamura Yuri; born July 15, 1984), known professionally as Ayana Tsubaki (椿 彩奈, Tsubaki Ayana; formerly written as 椿姫 彩菜), is a Japanese TV personality, fashion model and professional mahjong player. Tsubaki works for the Koakuma Ageha girls' fashion magazine.

== Biography ==
Ayana Tsubaki was born in the Saitama Prefecture in 1984. Tsubaki registered at Aoyama Gakuin University while presenting as a male, but left in the second year to work at a transsexual bar in Kabukichō, Tokyo.

In July 2006, she underwent gender confirmation surgery in Phuket, Thailand, and in December 2006, officially changed her registered gender from male to female in her koseki (family registry). She resumed studies at Aoyama Gakuin University in April 2007.

In April 2008, she launched the confectionery brand "Gâteaux de Fée" in collaboration with confectionery maker Chibori and co-produced with models Yui Kanno and Shizuka Muto. In October, she produced the legwear brand "informel by N-styles". In November, she was the poster girl for the event celebrating the 100th anniversary of the Japan–Columbia Friendship.

In March 2009, Tsubaki made her acting debut in the television drama Shukatsu no Musume. In September, she made her first stage appearance in Moulin de la Galette.

In February 2012, she appeared in her first leading role on stage in "Tennessee Waltz, the Last Fish of Mankind?...".

In June 2014, she reportedly left Horipro, where she had worked for four years.

On August 30, 2021, Tsubaki announced she had passed the professional exam of the Japan Professional Mahjong League and became a mahjong professional player.

== TV appearances ==
- Sunday Japon (サンデージャポン) (Tokyo Broadcasting System)
- Shukatsu no Musume (就活のムスメ) (TV Asahi, 2009)

== Works ==
=== Books ===
- Watashi, danshikō shusshin desu. (わたし、男子校出身です。; June 2008)
- C'est ma vie, photo book (October 2008)
- Tsubaki izen (椿姫以前; January 2009)
- Watashi, danshikō shusshin desu. Komikku (わたし、男子校出身です。Comic; (artist: Gosen Nakamori), May 2009)
- 3/25-sai korekara no watashi no "yume to genjitsu" (3/25才 これからのワタシの「夢と現実」; September 2009)
