= Tsubasa Masuwaka =

Japanese model (born 1985)

- 益若 つばさ
- Born: October 13, 1985 (age 41); Koshigaya, Saitama, Japan
- Other name: Milky Bunny
- Occupations: Model; singer
- Agent: Asia Promotion
- Height: 1.5 m (4 ft 11 in)(2012)
- Spouse: Naoki Umeda (m. 2007; div. 2013)
- Children: 1

Tsubasa Masuwaka (益若 つばさ, Masuwaka Tsubasa; born October 13, 1985, in Koshigaya, Saitama, Japan) is a Japanese model who is represented by the talent agency, Asia Promotion. She is known for being a model for Popteen, which gave her the nickname, 10 billion Yen Gal (100億円ギャル, 100 Oku-en Gyaru) because it has an economic effect that her projects such as wearing clothes and accessories. It gained 50 million Yen for the economic effect. She is nicknamed Tsu-chan (つーちゃん).

In 2012, Masukawa briefly held a singing career and released music under the name Milky Bunny.

== Discography ==
=== Studio albums ===
List of albums, with selected chart positions, sales figures and certifications
Title	Year	Details	Peak chart positions	Sales
Title	Year	Details	JPN	Sales
Milky Bunny	2012	Released: March 21, 2012; Label: Pony Canyon; Formats: CD, digital download	18	—
"—" denotes releases that did not chart or were not released in that region.

=== Singles ===
List of singles, with selected chart positions, sales figures and certifications
Title	Year	Peak chart positions	Sales	Album
Title	Year	JPN	Sales	Album
"Bunny Days"	2011	12	—	Milky Bunny
"Zurui yo..." (ずるいよ…) / "I Wish"	2012	12	—	Milky Bunny
"Namida Sora" (ナミダソラ)	2012	20	—	Non-album single
"Nee Kamatte?" (ねぇかまって?)	2013	28	—	Non-album single
"—" denotes releases that did not chart or were not released in that region.

== Filmography ==
=== Magazines ===
Year	Title	Notes
	Popteen	Kadokawa Haruki, exclusive
2009	Tamahiyo Kokko Club	Benesse Corporation
2009	PopSister	Kadokawa Haruki
2011	Saita	Seven & I Shuppan

=== Events ===
Year	Title	Notes	Ref.
	Tokyo Girls Collection		
	Kobe Collection		
	Shibuya Girls Collection		
	Shibuya Collection		
2012	Super Girls Festa in Taiwan 2012		
2012	Shibuya109 Festival 2012		
2015	7th Girls Blogger Style (GBS)	Roppongi Ex Theater	

=== TV series ===
Year	Title	Network	Notes
2009	We Can	BS Fuji	
2009	Omoikkiri Don!	NTV	Wednesday regular
2009	Majo-tachi no 22-ji	NTV	Quasi-regular
2009	Welcome TV	TV Tokyo	
2010	Don!	NTV	Tuesday regular
	London Hearts	TV Asahi	Quasi-regular

=== Drama ===
Year	Title	Role	Network	Notes
2012	Saigo Kara Nibanme no Koi	Haruka Kuriyama	Fuji TV	

=== Films ===
Year	Title	Role	Directed by	Notes	Ref.
2019	Fly Me to the Saitama	Okayo	Hideki Takeuchi		
2023	Fly Me to the Saitama: From Biwa Lake with Love	Okayo	Hideki Takeuchi		

=== Advertisements ===
Year	Title	Notes
2008	Dariya Palty "Gal-dō"	
2008	Dariya Palty "Barukore"	
2009	Ezaki Glico Pocky "Ebibade Pocky Tsubasa"	
2009	Universal Music Ichiban Taisetsuna Kimi e Okuru Uta "Tomodachi Kazoku e"	
2009	Universal Music Ichiban Taisetsuna Kimi e Okuru Uta "Koibito e"	
2009	Tsuya Gra Perfect Hair Iron	
2011	Dariya Palty "Awa Kara Debut"	
2011	McDonald's Happy Meal Sugar Bunnies "Cho & Ring"	
2011	T-Garden Candy Doll	
2011	Nihon Kraft Foods Stride Stripe "Happy Stripe Way"	
2011	FeRyu Furyūpuri-ki "Tsu-chan Print Seal-ki"	
2012	UCC Ueshima Coffee Paradise Tropical Tea	
2013	Ito-Yokado Ito-Yokado Rain Goods	
