= Shion Miyawaki =

Shion Miyawaki 宮脇詩音
- Born: Miyawaki Shion; 28 February 1990 (age 36); Nagasaki Prefecture, Japan
- Origin: Japan
- Genres: J-pop
- Occupations: Singer, songwriter
- Years active: 2007–present
- Label: Rhythm Zone (2007–present)
- Website: www.shion.tv

Shion Miyawaki (宮脇詩音) is a Japanese pop singer under the label Rhythm Zone along with fellow rival, classmate and friend Seara Kojo.

== Biography ==
At the age of 12, Shion was selected to go to the Avex Artist Academy. After 4 years of long-term lessons, she graduated with classmate Seara Kojo.

They were signed under the label Rhythm Zone and became the project The Rival. They both released a single, Shions was called BOY and Searas was called JOY. Both leading songs had the same melody, only a different arrangement. Both singles were released on the same day but failed reaching the top 100 on the Oricon chart.

After their first single they both released a 1000 copied limited single. The one selling her copies the fastest would be the first one re-signed on their label and would be the first one to release new material. Shion won this competition selling her single Shinin' Star a couple of weeks before Seara and so she started recording her mini-debut album Dear. Because they both out sold their single they got their own Official websites.

Shion now writes a cellphone story named KoiUta. This is a story about Shions experience with love. On 21 April 2009, Shions official website presented a new arranged version of Shinin' Star that would be available for online download on mu-mo. On 17 June the official website released a new song named Everything is you -MAKAI original mix- for the cellphone. CD Japan listed a new mini-album from Shion Miyawaki named Love Songs – Koi Uta to be released on 2 September. On 17 July 2009, the second mini-album was confirmed Shions official website. The mini-album contained songs in which she sang about her experience that were told in KoiUta.

In year 2016, her songs 'Kaketa Tsuki' and 'Mata Kimi ni Aeru Hi' are used as the Assassination Classroom: Second Season first and second ending songs respectively.

== Discography ==
=== Mini albums ===
Date of Release/Sale	Title	Label	Remarks
6 August 2008	dear	Rhythm Zone	Failed to chart on Oricon
2 September 2009	Love Songs – Koi Uta	Rhythm Zone	Failed to chart on Oricon
25 May 2016	SORA	Avex Trax	

=== Full albums ===
Date of Release/Sale	Title	Label	Remarks
25 July 2015	GIRL	Avex Trax	
21 December 2016	SHARE THE HAPPY	Avex Trax	

=== Singles ===
Date of Release/Sale	Title	Label	Remarks
25 July 2007	BOY	Rhythm Zone	#182 on Oricon
3 November 2007	Shinin' Star	Rhythm REPUBLIC	1000 limited copies – sold out
2 December 2015	Saigou no Yasashisa / Hanahiraku Toki	Avex Trax	

=== Singles (Digital Download) ===
Date of Release/Sale	Title	Label	Remarks
3 November 2010	Sekai wo Teki ni Mawashite mo	Rhythm Zone	
13 April 2011	RIPURAI	Rhythm Zone	
13 April 2011	WITH U	Rhythm Zone	
6 January 2016	Kaketa Tsuki	Avex Trax	
13 January 2016	Oki ni Iri no Kutsu		
20 January 2016	Maru demo Hatsu Koi		
20 July 2016	Doko demo SHEA – girlyparty		
19 October 2016	Ashita e no BASU		

=== Collaborations ===
1. 2008 October 8 ICE×SHION×nawii – Beat☆Bang!!Bang!!

== Television work ==
Shion Miyawaki is one of the main cast members of MTV Asia's reality television series, Shibuhara Girls.
