= Telekura =

Telephone-based dating/escort services in Japan

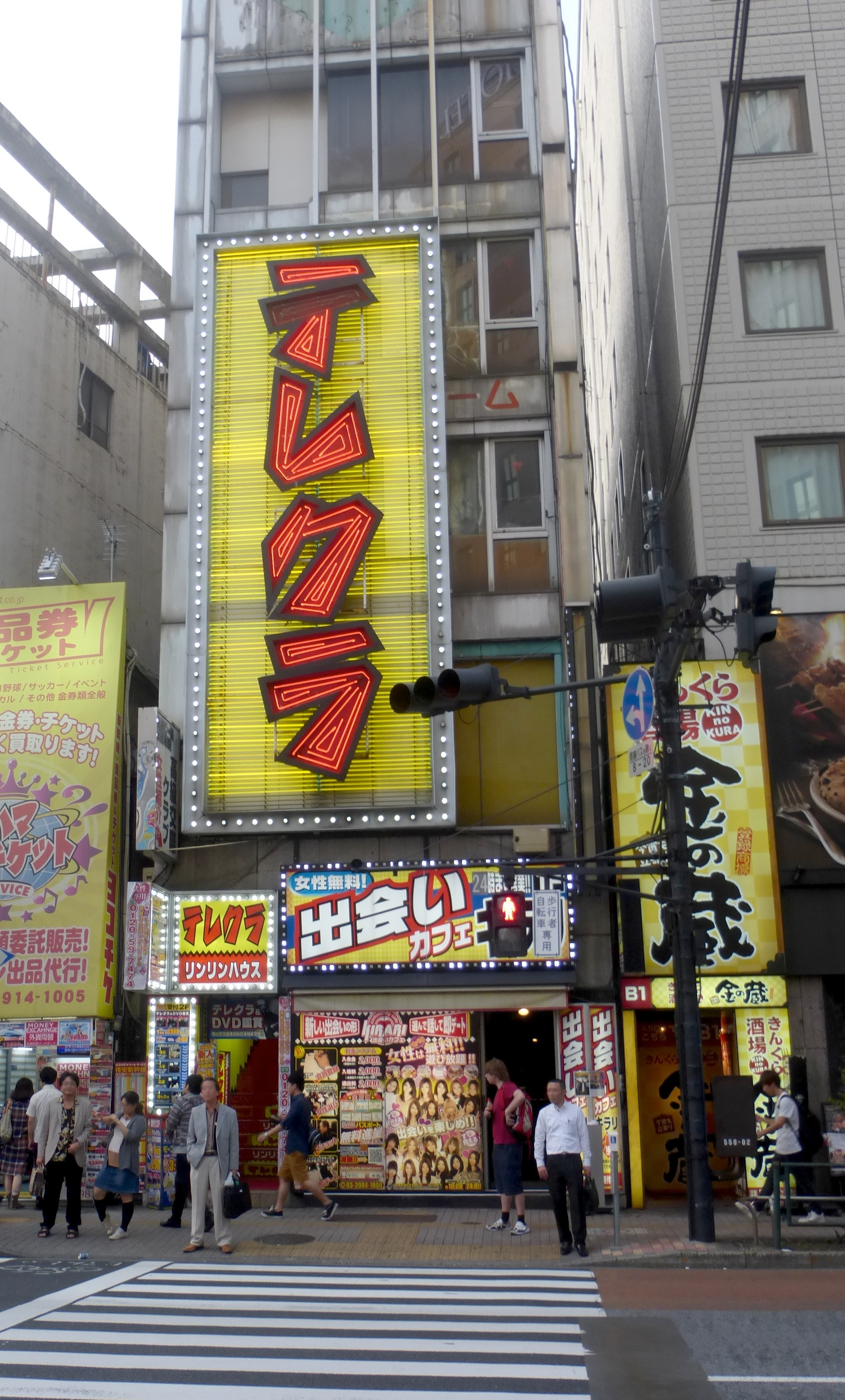
A telekura establishment in Ikebukuro, September 2015

Telekura (テレクラ, Terekura), an abbreviation for "telephone clubs" (テレフォン クラブ, terefon kurabu), are telephone-based dating services originating in Japan.

In the original incarnation of the telephone club, popular in the mid-1990s, a male client would pay a fee to enter a booth with a phone. The phone would then ring with calls from women or girls willing to go on a date – the implicit understanding being that this would lead to paid sex. These clubs have been outlawed as fronts for prostitution in some jurisdictions in Japan.

In modern telephone clubs, members pay a fee, after which they are supplied with the mobile phone numbers of women who sign up voluntarily to the sites. The caller then may arrange a meeting with a girl. Participants in the practice of compensated dating are thought to make use of this service.

A variation on the same theme is the merukura (メルクラ), a mobile phone and personal computer based dating services originating in Japan. The term comes from the contracted form of the Japanese mail club (メール クラブ, mēru kurabu). Emails are exchanged between members through a central server, ensuring email addresses remain private. Mail clubs are used in various ways, the most common being for dating, friend searching, or to find sex partners. It is common that only the male has to pay to participate.
