= Rainbow March =

Annual LGBT event in Sapporo, Japan

The Rainbow March was a parade for lesbian, gay, bisexual, transgender and transsexual people (LGBT) people in Japan. Established in 1996, the event held in Sapporo, Hokkaido was the longest continuously run parade for LGBT people in the country. It was last held in 2013.

== See also ==
- LGBT rights in Japan
- Homosexuality in Japan
- List of LGBT events
