= Shibuhara Girls =

- Title card
- Genre: Reality television
- Starring: Marie Ishikawa, Shion Miyawaki, Kozue Akimoto, Sun Wei
- Country of origin: Japan
- Original language: Japanese

Production
- Production locations: Tokyo: Shibuya, Harajuku

Original release
- Network: MTV Japan; MTV Asia
- Release: 8 January – 9 April 2011
- Release: 4 December 2011 – 26 February 2012

Shibuhara Girls is an MTV Japan/MTV Asia reality television series that centers on the lives of a group of young aspiring Japanese women as they seek stardom in the popular pop culture and fashion districts of Tokyo – Shibuya and Harajuku.

All the dialogue and narration in the series is in Japanese, however English subtitles are available in English speaking markets.

For season 2, Shibuhara Girls aired on MTV Japan from 4 December 2011 until 26 February 2012. In Southeast Asia, it aired on MTV Asia on 21 March 2012. Since October 2013, Shibuhara Girls is also broadcast in France on the new channel J-One, which is a channel focused on Japanese culture.

== Cast ==
Name	Goals and Aspirations
Marie Ishikawa	A singer who is about to make her recording debut in 2011 under Rhythm Zone.
Shion Miyawaki	Debuted in 2007 but is searching for a new direction as her music career slows down.
Kozue Akimoto	An aspiring model who is stepping out of her father's shadow and bringing with her a unique taste in fashion.
Sun Wei	With her stardom on the rise, she searches for true love amongst her admirers.
