= Happie Nuts =

Japanese fashion magazine

- September 2010
- Categories: Fashion
- Frequency: Monthly
- Circulation: 190,000
- Publisher: Inforest
- First issue: October 1997
- Country: Japan
- Based in: Tokyo
- Language: Japanese

Happie Nuts is a gal fashion magazine published monthly in Japan by Inforest Publishing. Targeted at women in their late teens and early 20s, Happie Nuts was highly oriented toward the style of oneesangyaru (お姉さんギャル; lit. 'older-sister gal') and dark-skin. Based in Tokyo, it was in circulation between 1997 and 2016, and 2020 to present.

== History ==
Happie Nuts was first published as Happie in October 1997. In late 2004, Happie changed its name to Happie Nuts. The change happened in the November 2004 issue. It is a fashion magazine targeted to female teenagers.

Happie Nuts spawned its special edition, Koakuma & Nuts, in October 2005, which later grew to be Koakuma Ageha as one of the highest-selling fashion magazines in Japan.

In 2014 Happie Nuts was closed, but was restarted in July 2015. However, the magazine ended publication again in March 2016. Since then, the magazine started publication again in 2020.

== Models ==
Its exclusive models are called "Nuts Mates", which have included Ena Matsumoto, Sayoko Ozaki, Akane Satomi, Sayaka Taniguchi, Miyu Ishima, Saki Nanba, Eriko Tachiya, Shizuka Takeda, Hiromi, Akane Suda, and Nicole Abe.

== External ==
- Happie Nuts Official Website (in Japanese)
- Fashion Tips On Cocktail Dresses For Party
