= Koakuma Ageha =

Gyaru fashion and lifestyle magazine in Japan

Koakuma Ageha 小悪魔ageha
- October 2010
- Chief editor: Rie Momose2021–present
- Former editors: Hisako Nakajo 2005–2011 Marika Koizumi 2015; Nobuko Yabe 2015–2017 Natsuko Takano 2017–2019
- Categories: Fashion, Lifestyle
- Frequency: Bi-yearly
- Circulation: 350,000–400,000
- Publisher: HJ 2021–present Transmedia 2017 – 2020; Neko Publishing 2015–2017; Inforest 2005–2014
- First issue: October 2005
- Company: HJ Co., Ltd.
- Country: Japan
- Language: Japanese
- Website: https://agehaageha.jp/

Koakuma Ageha (小悪魔ageha, lit. "Little-devil (or demon) Swallowtail butterfly") is a Japanese magazine that introduces the latest fashion and lifestyle trends popular among hostesses that is published twice a year, with the main target audience being women in their teens to 20s. Fans of the magazine are also referred to as "agejo" (age嬢, a combination of "Ageha" and "Lady") and often members of the Gyaru subculture.

During its peak in 2008, 300,000 of the 400,000 copies produced were sold. In addition to this extremely high circulation, the Koakuma Ahega is unique for promoting hostess club (Japanese-style cabaret) culture, as it mainly targets women who work at hostess clubs as hostesses, and most of its models are hostesses who actually work at hostess clubs.

Sociologist Shinji Miyadai has described this magazine as a "textbook for hostesses". Some describe this magazine as the "bible for hostesses".

After multiple bankruptcies, Koakuma Ageha was revived as online magazine on January 5, 2021 with special physical issues releasing bi-yearly since May 26, 2021.

== History ==
Koakuma Ageha was first published under the name "Koakuma & Nuts" in October 2005 with a 27-year-old woman, Hisako Nakajo, who had been familiar with the gyaru scene, as its chief editor. Koakuma & Nuts was only a special edition of the dark-skin oriented Happie Nuts gyaru fashion magazine, but after publication of the second issue, it changed its name to "Koakuma Ageha" and became monthly in October 2006. Circulation was then around 220,000 but climbed to 350,000 by the end of 2008. Hisako Nakajo left Koakuma Ageha, and its parent company Inforest Publishing, in November 2011.

== Model and style ==
Koakuma Ageha's exclusive models are called "Age-mo(s)", and its irregularly appearing models are called "Age-jō(s)" (アゲ嬢). Most of them are active hostesses from various cities "of the night" all over the islands of Japan. Unlike the ones in Happie Nuts, Ageha models are not required to be dark-skinned. Their unique styles of fashion is called "Ageha-kei" (アゲハ系; lit. "Ageha-style"), which has become quite popular among women in their teens and 20s. Some explain the typical "Ageha-kei" style as an "evolved form of the gyaru style, grown in the cradle of the hostess club scene, with an essence of yanki". The Ageha style, as a lifestyle, is noted for its tendency to be "local-oriented", in contrast to most other fashion-based lifestyles which tend to be Tokyo-centric.

A 2009 issue featuring the theme "yami" (left) and a usual 2011 issue (right)

Koakuma Ageha's uniqueness is also attributed to its tone; it features hostesses' lifestyles without romanticization, not just recounting the glamorous aspects, and although its main focus is, of course, fashion, it sometimes features the serious themes of "yami (simultaneously meaning "darkness 闇" and "sickness 病") in the human heart". Models talk actively about their "darksides" in their own way, and often reveal some "negative secrets" about their lives and pasts, such as the ones about delinquency, running away, hikikomori, bullying, betrayal, heartbreak, mental illness, trauma, suicide, self-image issue, sexuality, loneliness, abused childhood, domestic violence, and alcoholism. This is considered quite unique for a Japanese fashion magazine, as Japanese fashion magazines are in general relentlessly light-hearted from beginning to end.

Ageha models often garner an almost cult-like popularity and attract large amounts of media attention. Eri Momoka, known as "Momoeri", is an early example, and just like Momoka, who has her own brand "Moery", some Ageha models individually launch their own fashion brands. Sumire (1987–2009) launched her own fashion brand "Divas" and often introduced herself as the "Divas designer" during the last days of her life. Shizuka Mutoh, an irregularly appearing Ageha model, launched her own fashion brand "Rady" in 2008 and its monthly net earnings reached $1 million in April 2011.

== Sister magazines ==
Cover of Ane Ageha, November 2011 Issue, with former Koakuma Ageha models Sayaka Araki and Sayo Hayakawa

=== Ane Ageha ===
Ane Ageha (姉ageha, meaning "Older-sister Swallowtail") was first published in November 2010 under the name "Oneh-san Ageha" (お姉さんageha) as a special edition of Koakuma Ageha, and it became independent in March 2011. Ane Ageha is a bi-monthly fashion and cosmetic magazine, and its target audience is females in their late twenties and older.

=== Kimono Ageha ===
Kimono Ageha (着物ageha) was first published in December 2010 as a special edition of Koakuma Ageha. It is an irregularly published magazine specialized in kimono, and is modeled by Koakuma Ageha models.

=== I Love Mama ===
I Love Mama «stylized as "I LOVE mama"» was first published in September 2008 under the name "Mama Nuts × Ageha" as a special co-edition of Koakuma Ageha with Happie Nuts. Mama Nuts × Ageha changed its name to "I Love Mama" and became monthly in March 2009. I Love Mama is a magazine especially for gyaru women who have gotten pregnant and become mothers (called "gyaru mama") — the first-ever magazine dedicated to gyaru-mamas.

== See also ==
- Japanese clothing
