= Men's Egg =

Japanese fashion magazine

- Categories: Gyaru fashion
- Founded: 1999
- Final issue: October 2013
- Country: Japan
- Language: Japanese

MensEGG was a style magazine distributed in Japan aimed at young men published between 1999 and 2013. It was a counterpart of Egg magazine, which focused on Gyaru-oh (male Gyaru) fashions – it was the gyaru-oh bible. There is also Men's Egg Bitter magazine, aimed at Gyaruo aged 23 and above.

== History and profile ==
Men's Egg' was established in 1999. The image of the magazine revolved around Japanese working-class trends, appealing to young men mostly under 20. It draws inspiration from Japanese "yankee" (delinquent) culture, also with techno and surfer influences. This style is often looked down on by some other Japanese, who associate it with juvenile delinquency, and also, "Inakamono" (somebody from the countryside). The generic "Bon-Jovi" style featured in Men's Egg magazine can be found being offered cheaply in chain clothing-stores across Japan such as "Zenmall" or "Jeansmate" although the big name gyaruo fashion brands sell for high prices.

Apart from fashion, the magazine also included information for young teenagers, such as advice on picking up girls, dating, and explicit articles related to sex. The magazine also contained information about club events.

Men's Egg ceased publication in October 2013.
