= Popteen =

Japanese fashion magazine

- Popteen November 2019 cover
- Categories: Fashion
- Frequency: Monthly
- Founded: 1980
- First issue: 1 October 1980?
- Final issue: February 2023
- Company: Fujimi Shobo (1989–1994); Asuka Shinsha (1994); Kadokawa Haruki Corporation (1994–2023)
- Country: Japan
- Based in: Chiyoda-ku, Tokyo
- Language: Japanese
- Website: https://popteen.co.jp/media/

Popteen is a monthly teenage fashion magazine published by the Kadokawa Haruki Corporation in Japan. The first issue was published on 1 October 1980 by Fujimi Shobo. Later issues were published by Asuka Shinsha who bought the magazine for 200 million yen. In 1994 the magazine was bought by the Kadokawa Haruki Corporation for 600 million yen, and has since become its flagship publication.

Popteen is one of Asia's top fashion magazines. The magazine is published in Japan, Taiwan, and Thailand, and has launched a web presence in the United States.

Both Ayumi Hamasaki and Kumiko Funayama have been featured on the cover 19 times, Hamasaki first appearing in 2000 and Funayama in 2008. Other artists who have appeared on the cover include Kumi Koda and Namie Amuro, as well as foreign artists like Avril Lavigne, Britney Spears, Fergie, and Gwen Stefani.

The magazine is famous for including dokusha-moderu (読者モデル)where the readers of Popteen are able to become models in the magazine. It is also notable for its coverage of Gyaru fashions. In April 2010 Popteen's older sister magazine PopSister was officially launched.

== Pop Models ==
Exclusive models for Popteen are known as Pop Models, while male models are known as Pop Mens. The models often use a nickname while modeling for the magazine.

- Honoka Naniwa (Honobabi)
- Reina Tsuchiya (Reipoyo)
- Ena Nakano (Chanena)
- Crea Shōji (Cretan)
- Noa Tsurushima (Noanyan)
- Meru Nukumi (Meruru)
- Neo Yamazaki
- Riko (Rikoriko)
- chiitan☆
- Yura Hirano (Yupipi)
- Airi Furuta (Airiru)
- Yua Thuthui (Yuathi)
- Kanon Nonomura (Nonnon)
- Ayami Fukumizu (Ayamin)
- Yuna (Yunatako)
- Kyoka Yugami (Kyokyo)
- Rea Gonzui (Reapapi)

=== Pop Mens ===
- Shimon Ōkura (Shimon)
- Gon Suzuki (Gongon)
- Kaede Matsuhisa (Kaede)
- Batoshin (バトシン)
- Takupon (たくぽん)
- Ken Nakajima (Kenken)
- Akira Issei Kato (Akise)

== Former models ==
=== Pop Models ===
- Moe Oshikiri
- Tsubasa Masuwaka
- Aki Kawamura
- Rola
- Nana Saitō
- Rena Takeda (Renarena)
- Nicole Fujita (Nicolun)
- Shione Sawada
- Rina Ogiwara
- Mayuchiru Kitazawa
- Sayaka Imai (Saaya, 今井彩矢佳)
- Serika Okuwaki (Serikamacho, 奥脇晴梨夏)
- Dakota Rose (Dako-chan)
- Hikari Shiina (Pikarin)
- Kumiko Funayama (Kumikki)
- Nozomi Maeda (Maenon)
- Hina Kawago (Hinatan)
- Rana Maruyama (Ranya)
- Miyū Ikeda (Michopa)
- Yurano Ochi (Yurayura)
- Natsue Tokumoto (Nachos)
- Yumika Hirao (Yumichii)
- Nana
- Yukino
- Yuumi Shida (Yuumin)
- Kim Yewon (Umji of GFriend)
- Tsuki Fukutomi (Taruchan)
- Miu Suzuki (Miupiyo)

=== Pop Mens ===
- Shugo Oshinari
- Sousuke Takaoka
- Koji Kominami (Konan)
