= Egg (magazine) =

Japanese magazine

- April 2011
- Categories: Gyaru fashion
- Frequency: monthly
- Founded: 1995 (web ver. 2018)
- Final issue: 2014
- Country: Japan
- Language: Japanese
- Website: https://eggegg.jp/

Egg was a style magazine for gyaru fashion, distributed in Japan. It featured photos of ganguro girls and synopses of their tastes and popular trends. The magazine also usually had photos of the newest fashions, where to buy them, latest hairstyles, cell phones, and make up tips. It also had candid photos of ganguro girls on the streets of Japan, similar to Fruits magazine. Egg had its own models which starred in every magazine. Due to the decline of Gyaru popularity, the magazine shut down with the last issue on 31 May 2014.

Egg made its return as an online magazine in March 2018. Since then, 10 physical issues have been published.

== Special editions ==
Along with the main monthly issues, Egg also released special magazine issues. One was a seasonal beauty magazine called "egg's Beauty" which used to be released each year, but later was typically released twice a year in spring and autumn & winter editions. Other special releases included "Manba" which was an issue published in 2004 when Manba was still a big boom in Japan, "Romi & Kana 120%" which was released in 2010 and was dedicated to popular and longstanding Egg models Hiromi Hosoi (referred to as Romihi in the magazine) and Kanako Kawabata's trip to Guam, and the most recent "Flowers" which was released in March 2011, and is described as "Girl's history of egg" which recapitulates ten years of the magazine.

== Models ==
Egg typically used the same models for each issue of the magazine, some of whom have been involved with the magazine for a very long time. Every so often, these "older generation" of models left the magazine, and newer girls came in. Girls who left the magazine usually went to model for another fashion magazine, or would delve into something different, such as acting, singing or even setting up a clothing line, all of which were popular options. Some girls who left the magazine returned to a normal life outside of the media world and were very rarely seen in the public eye again. Notable Egg models Rumi Itabashi (formally Ringo) and Kaoru Watanabe who were part of the magazine for a long time have since left the magazine and have had children.

Egg usually recruited new models for the magazine while finding girls for "Street Snaps", usually in the famous Center Gai (センター街 Sentā-gai) in Shibuya, Tokyo. This appeared in the "Street Groove" section of the magazine which is a mix of random girls and Egg models. After a while of appearing in Street Snaps and small features and sections, girls could debut as more regular and full-time models for the magazine. Models for the magazine had public blogs which were followed by fans and usually contained aspects of their personal lives as well as things related to the magazine or other career projects.

== Other publications ==
Egg had a few other counterpart magazines, including one for men called MensEGG, and also one for teenage boys called "Men's Egg Youth". These magazines again had their own models who feature in every issue. MensEGG had a more grown-up and "rockier" style compared to Egg which mixed both cute and sexy styles, and Men's Egg Youth had a more colourful and extreme style. A sideline from Egg magazine was "EggMgg TV" (pronounced "eggmegg") which was an internet programme hosted by some of the models from MensEGG. Each episode featured different events that may have been happening in and around Shibuya, such as magazine parties or brand promotions, and also different topics related to young people such as relationships and dating.
