= Host and hostess clubs =

Attractively staffed night club in East Asia

A hostess club is a type of night club found primarily in Japan which employs mostly female staff and caters to men seeking drinks and attentive conversation. A host club is a similar establishment where mostly male staff attend to women. Host and hostess clubs are considered part of mizu shōbai (lit. 'water trade'), the night-time entertainment business in Japan.

== Hostess clubs ==
=== Japan ===
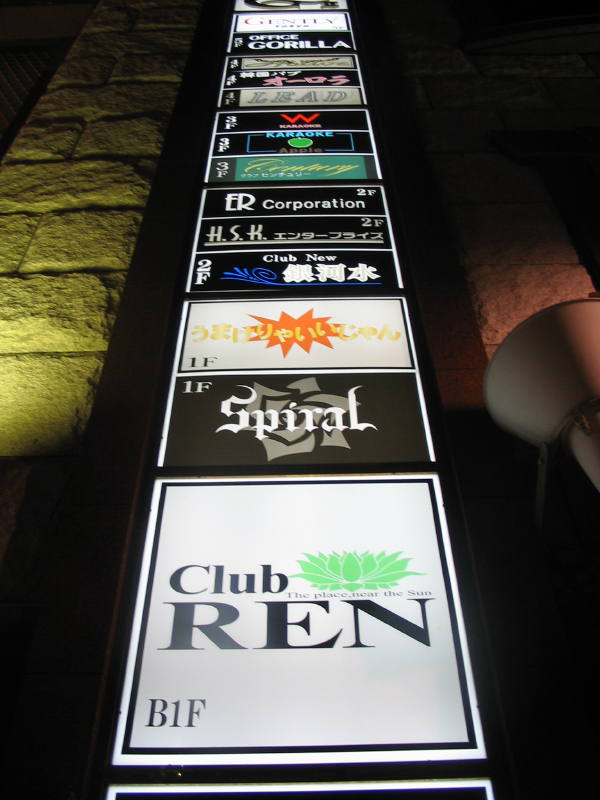
Signage for hostess bars in Kabukichō, Tokyo

There are a few types of hostess club-type establishments in Japan with the majority falling into one of two categories: kyabakura (キャバクラ), a portmanteau of kyabarē (キャバレー; lit. "cabaret"), or the more exclusive kurabu (クラブ; lit. "club"). Kyabakura hostesses are known as kyabajō (キャバ嬢) (cabaret girl), and many use professional names, called "genji names" (源氏名, genji-na). They light cigarettes, provide beverages, offer flirtatious conversation, and sing karaoke. The clubs also often employ a female bartender usually well-trained in mixology, and who may also be the manager or mamasan.

Hostesses often drink with customers each night, and alcohol-related behavior problems are fairly common. Most bars use a commission system by which hostesses receive a percentage of sales.

Businesses may pay for tabs as company expenses to promote trust among male co-workers or clients. At one establishment, about 90% of all tabs were reportedly paid for by companies.

Patrons are generally greeted at the door and seated as far away from other customers as possible. In some instances, a customer can choose with whom he spends time, but most often that is decided by the house. In either case, the hostess will leave after a set amount of time or a set number of drinks.

Hostess clubs have a "no touching" policy, and patrons who try to initiate private or sexual conversation are removed. A red-light district version of the host/hostess club exists, called seku-kyabakura or ichya-kyabakura, where patrons are permitted to touch their host/hostess above the waist and engage in sexual conversation topics or kissing. Normal hostess clubs are classified as food and entertainment establishments and regulated by the Businesses Affecting Public Morals Regulation Act, prohibiting any form of sexual contact between employees and customers. Hostess clubs also need a permit to allow dancing. Clubs are inspected often by the Public Safety Commission. Any club found to be violating its permitted activities may have its business license suspended.

Hostessing is a popular employment option among young foreign women in Japan. Most visa types do not allow this type of work, as hostessing falls under the category of fūzoku (風俗), so many choose to work illegally. The clubs sometimes take advantage of the women's precarious legal situation. The industry and its dangers were highlighted in 1992 when Carita Ridgway, an Australian hostess, was drugged and killed after a paid date, and in 2000 when Lucie Blackman, a British hostess, was abducted, raped and murdered, allegedly by the same customer, serial killer Joji Obara. The government promised to crack down on illegal employment of foreigners in hostess bars, but an undercover operation in 2006 found that several hostess bars were willing to employ a foreign woman illegally.

In December 2009, the Kyabakura Union was formed to represent hostess bar workers.

==== Snack bars ====
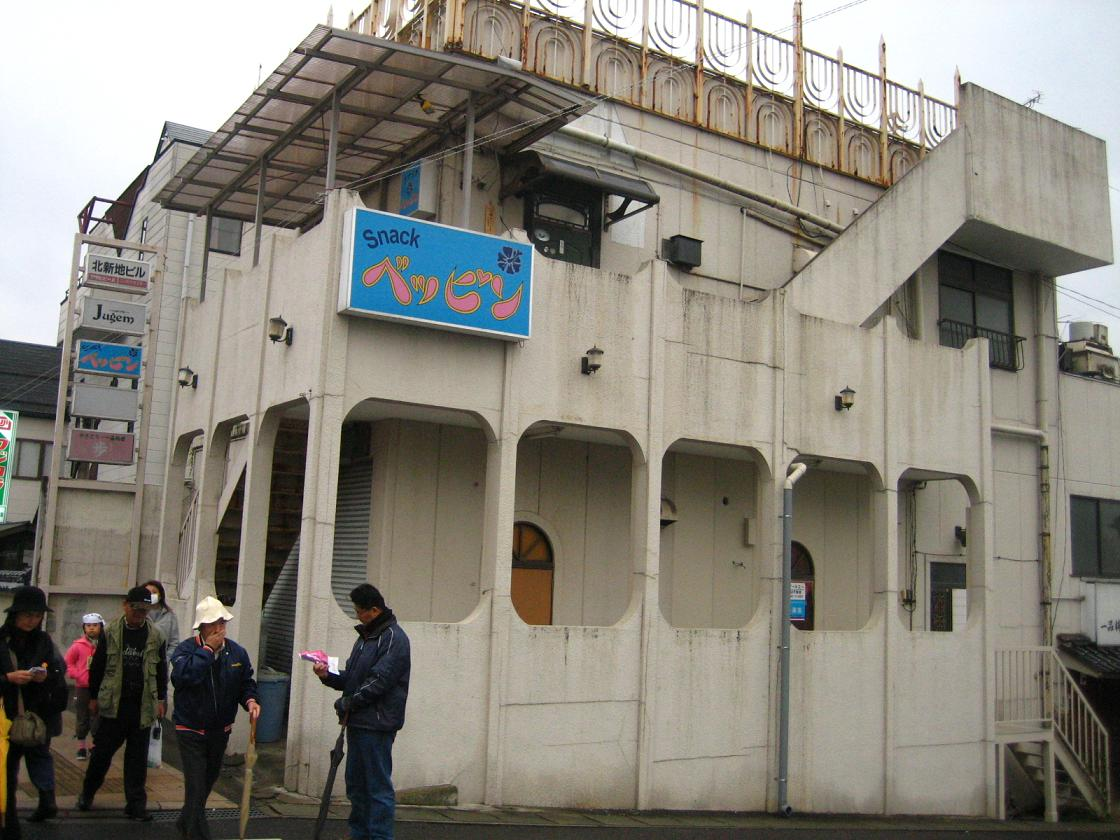
A snack bar in Fukushima Prefecture, Japan

A "snack bar" (スナックバー, sunakku bā), "snack" for short, refers to a kind of hostess bar. It is an alcohol-serving bar that employs female staff to serve and flirt with male customers. Although they do not charge an entry fee (and often have no set prices on their menus), they usually charge either an arbitrary fee or a set hourly fee plus a "bottle charge", by which customers purchase a bottle in their own name, which is kept for future visits.

=== Venues outside Japan ===
Hostess bars are also found in other East Asian countries, as well as in Hawaii, Guam, California, and British Columbia. In Hawaii, approximately half of Oahu's 300 bars are licensed as hostess bars.

Some bars in Thailand label themselves as hostess bars; these are loosely related to the East Asian practice, although they are essentially go-go bars that do not feature dancing.

== Host clubs ==
=== Japan ===
A host club (ホストクラブ, hosuto kurabu) has female customers pay for male company. Host clubs are typically found in more densely populated areas of Japan. They are numerous in Tokyo districts such as Kabukichō, and in Osaka's Umeda and Namba. Customers are typically wives of rich men, women working as hostesses in hostess clubs, or sex workers.

The first host club was opened in Tokyo in 1966. In 1996, the number of Tokyo host clubs was estimated to be 200, and a night of non-sexual entertainment could cost US$500–600. Professor Yoko Tajima of Hosei University explained the phenomenon by Japanese men's lack of true listening to the problems of women, and by women's desire to take care of a man and be loved back.

Young women lured to "malicious" host clubs can rack up large debts; some of them turn to prostitution to pay them back. Habitually, the store also co-signs for the customer's debts with the host. These schemes have become a problem in Japan, and some stores have banned them. Host clubs are classified as food and entertainment establishments. They are regulated by the Businesses Affecting Public Morals Regulation Act, which prohibits any form of sexual contact between employees and customers. Any club found violating its permitted activities can have its business license suspended. At some insufficiently monitored establishments, people unable to pay bar bills have been forced into coerced sex work and sex trafficking.

=== Hosts ===
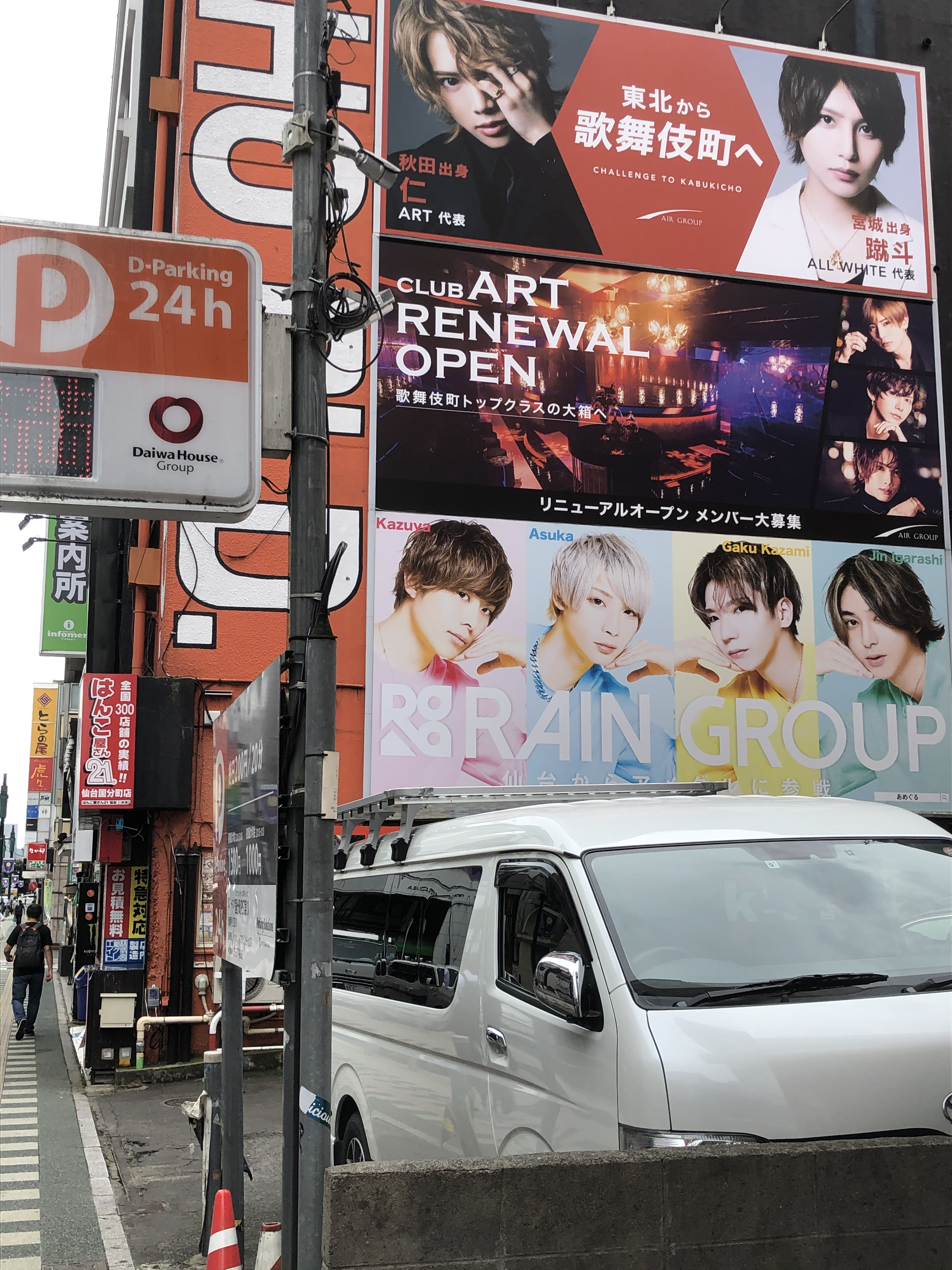
Sign posted in Kokubuncho, Sendai City

Male hosts pour drinks and will often flirt with their clients.

Hosts' ages usually range between 18 and the mid-20s. They will take a stage name that will often describe their character. Men who become hosts are often those who either cannot find a white-collar job or are enticed by the prospect of high earnings through commission.

While hostess bars in Tokyo often have designated staff who work on getting clients to come into their clubs, some hosts are sent out onto the streets to find customers, who are referred to as catch (キャッチ, kyatchi), usually the younger, less-experienced hosts. A common look for a host is a dark suit, a collared shirt, silver jewelry, a dark tan, and bleached hair.

Pay is usually determined by commission on drink sales, with hosts often drinking far past a healthy limit, usually while trying to hide their drunkenness. Because the base hourly wage is usually extremely low, almost any man can become a host regardless of looks or charisma (depending on the bar). Hosts who cannot increase their sales usually drop out very soon, because of the minimum wage. The environment at a host bar is usually competitive, with tens of thousands of dollars sometimes offered to the host who achieves the highest sales.

=== Drinks ===
Many of the clientele who visit host bars are hostesses who finish work at around 1:00 or 2:00 a.m., causing host bars to often begin business at around midnight and finish in the morning or midday, with hosts working to the point of exhaustion. Business times have changed in recent years, due to the order of the police, to address the increased incidence of illegal prostitution by host club customers who could not pay the host club debts they had accumulated. Most of these clubs open about 4:00 p.m. and have to be closed between midnight and 2:00 a.m.

Buying bottles of champagne usually means a "champagne call" (シャンパンコール, shanpan kōru). All the hosts of the club will gather around the table for a song, talk, or a mic performance of some kind. The champagne will be drunk straight from the bottle by the customer, then the host, and then the other hosts. Often, a wet towel is held under the chins of customers and hosts while they drink to prevent spills. The performance differs from club to club, and is believed to have originated at club Ryugujo in Kabukicho by the manager Yoritomo.

A "champagne tower" (シャンパンタワー, shanpan tawā) can usually be done for special events. Champagne glasses are arranged in a pyramid, and champagne is poured onto the top glass until it trickles down the layers. These costs typically range from 500,000 to 1,000,000 yen (US$3,500-7,000) or more.

=== Etiquette ===
On the first visit to a host club, the customer is presented with a menu of the hosts available, and decides which host to meet first. Over the course of the night, the customer will meet most of the hosts. The customer then decides which host they like most, and can make it their named host (指名, shimei). This can be done by buying a "bottle keep" (a bottle of liquor to save for next time). The named host will receive a percentage of the future sales generated by that customer. Most clubs operate on a "permanent nomination" (永久指名, eikyū shimei) system: once the named host has been nominated, a customer cannot change hosts at that club.

Sometimes a host will go with a customer for a meal or karaoke after hours. This is called "after" (アフター, afutā). Staying longer at the host club is considered proper treatment for a host. It is possible to go on day trips or travel with a host, but a host can only go with their own customer. A host who interacts with another host's customer may be fined or fired from the club. Drinks can be purchased on tab, but contact information is taken, and the customer must pay later. If the customer does not pay, the host must. It is considered rude to leave a customer alone, called "only" (オンリー, onrī). A customer who is abusive and troublesome is called a "painful customer" (痛客, itakyaku) and may be expelled from a club.

=== Business strategy ===
Usually, hosts try to make the clients feel loved and romanced without having sex with them though sex with clients is not unheard of or forbidden. It is not uncommon for a host to act like a boyfriend, doing such things as calling their customers outside of the club and attempting to create emotional dependence."Mail business" (メール営業) is the practice of a host emailing a customer regularly to ensure their return.

Host bars are increasingly seen as predatory or malicious businesses. A common business strategy for hosts to attract female clients to the host club is to pose as a normal man on a dating app, establish initial contact, and start a relationship. The host will then reveal that he is the host and ask the woman for a favor: to visit him at his club for an evening. There, she will be charged for drinks that the host commissions. The woman may be conned into ordering thousands of dollars of alcohol without being told the price, usually in a bid to help her 'boyfriend' achieve a top host or number one sales ranking, and then strongarmed into paying the bill using a predatory loan the next day, and promptly dropped by the host.

In more nefarious cases, the host will continue inviting the woman, who believes they are in a relationship, and cause her to become increasingly indebted to the host club. When she is unable to pay, the host refers her to a hostess club, soapland, or similar sex industry establishment to earn money to pay off the debt. The host receives a kickback from the establishment for the referral and will encourage her to continue spending at the host club.

== New regulations ==
To combat the increasing number of customers reporting fraud, exploitation, and even being pressured into sex trafficking, Japan passed the 2025 Entertainment and Amusement Business Act revisions, which focus heavily on cracking down on the exploitative business strategy practices in host/hostess clubs and late-night hospitality. Tactics that promote an aggressive sales environment, such as fake rankings and exaggerated titles (e.g., "CEO," "No.1 Host"), are now banned, as are false and exaggerated advertising. Scout kickbacks for referring new employees into sex work are now forbidden, with penalties including significant fines and jail time for both establishments and individuals. There are additional new rules for digital platforms and clearer guidelines for venues like snack bars to ensure safer, more transparent nightlife and protect consumers from predatory schemes.

== Kyabakura Union ==
The Kyabakura Union (キャバクラユニオン, Kyabakura Yunion; lit. "Cabaret Club Union") is a trade union for hostess club employees in Japan. It was formed on December 22, 2009, by Rin Sakurai, who formed the union in response to problems hostess-club employees reported with their employers, including harassment and unpaid wages. The union is affiliated with the Part-timer, Arbeiter, Freeter & Foreign Workers Union, often referred to as the "Freeter" Union.

== China ==
=== KTV/hostess bar in China ===
KTVs are a source of interactive musical entertainment through the use of a karaoke bar. KTVs are usually found in East Asian nations and are a principal location for Chinese business meetings.

=== Hostesses within the KTV ===
Chinese businessmen use hostesses to persuade other businessmen and to secure favors in the future. Hostesses are expected to pressure customers to drink, sing, and gain as much attention as possible.

Chinese businessmen who visit the KTV prioritize establishing connections within their respective companies. Hostesses internally degrade their personal and "moral appearance" to satisfy a sentiment of masculine pleasure. This may entail the loss of moral code and ethics for the women in the KTV. These values also relate to the foundations of guanxi, by which there is created a hierarchical system of social order because men possess more power in the KTV than do the hostesses.

=== Implications of mass alcohol consumption ===
KTVs are a typical setting for Chinese business practices, where businessmen seek to build connections and loyalty with other businessmen. They will try to establish a comfortable setting by providing fruit plates, women, or alcoholic drinks. Chinese businessmen can be seen drinking baijiu up to six or seven days per week solely to portray their loyalty to the businessmen principles and fulfill the pleasurable environment of the KTV. Mass alcohol consumption has negative effects on the bodies of individuals who frequently visit KTVs.

Heavy alcohol consumption is a prominent factor in KTVs.

== Taiwan ==
In recent years, a variant of male host clubs—often called 男模會館 (nánmó huìguǎn, "male model clubs")—has emerged in Taiwan. These establishments differ in various ways from both traditional hostess bars and the Japanese host clubs.

=== Characteristics ===
Male hosts provide companionship through conversation, drinks, singing, dancing, and games. The setting is often more about emotional and social interaction than physical or sexual intimacy.

The clientele is primarily female, though there may also be male customers depending on the specific club. Customers can range from average consumers to more affluent individuals willing to pay for higher-end, more private experiences.

Income for hosts typically comes from a mix of base pay, commissions on drink sales or service fees, tips, and sometimes membership or appointment ("reservation") fees.

Clubs often use platforms such as Instagram and TikTok to promote their hosts and make engaging videos to find new customers.

=== Legal and social issues ===
Some of these clubs register as catering or entertainment businesses. Concerns have arisen over underage involvement, unclear labor conditions, and customer debts tied to service fees.

A case in Kaohsiung drew attention when a club allegedly employed a 16-year-old and held her responsible for customer debts, prompting discussion about age verification, labor rights, and government oversight.

== See also ==
- Bargirl
- Karaoke box
- Maid café
- Prostitution in Japan
