= SRTX =

Canadian material science and technology company

- Type: Private
- Industry: Apparel, hosiery, swimwear
- Founded: 2017
- Founder: Katherine Homuth
- Headquarters: Montreal, Quebec, Canada

SRTX is a Canadian material science and technology company based in Montreal, Quebec. Founded by entrepreneur Katherine Homuth, SRTX is best known for the development of the Sheertex rip-resist knit that is used to produce sheer tights, swimwear, and waterproof membranes for other types of apparel.SRTX specializes in producing textile components and apparel made using the polymer UHMWPE (ultra-high molecular weight polyethylene).It was founded in 2017.

== History ==
SRTX was established in 2017, Katherine Homuth in Muskoka, Ontario in Canada. The company initially gained attention through a successful Kickstarter campaign under the name Sheerly Genius, which aimed to manufacture hosiery with a focus on product durability.

The first prototypes of the Sheertex knit were produced in 2017 with the goal of producing a pair of tights that would not rip. The company was accepted into its first Y Combinator program in Fall 2017. It became part of Y Combinator's Winter 2018 batch. Sheerly Genius Pantyhose were named one of TIME Magazine's Best Inventions in Fall 2018.

The company was eventually renamed from Sheerly Genius to Sheertex to reflect its flagship product. More recently, it was rebranded as SRTX.

By 2020, SRTX had 200 employees.

SRTX expanded into wholesale in 2023 and began selling products through retailers such as H&M and Cos. The company also began selling products through the QVC shopping channel. In 2024, it was reported that SRTX had become B Corp-certified.

In 2023, the company launched Watertex, a line of swimsuits and other fast-drying, hydrophobic apparel products made using UHMWPE.

== Products and services ==
SRTX’s flagship product is Sheertex sheer pantyhose, which is designed to resist tearing and snagging. Sheertex is sold in several styles and colors.

The company currently operates two plants in Montreal. SRTX has also developed a manufacturing software platform named Cortex, which automates manufacturing operations and reduces environmental impacts.
