= Fully fashioned stockings =

Seamed vintage-style nylon stockings

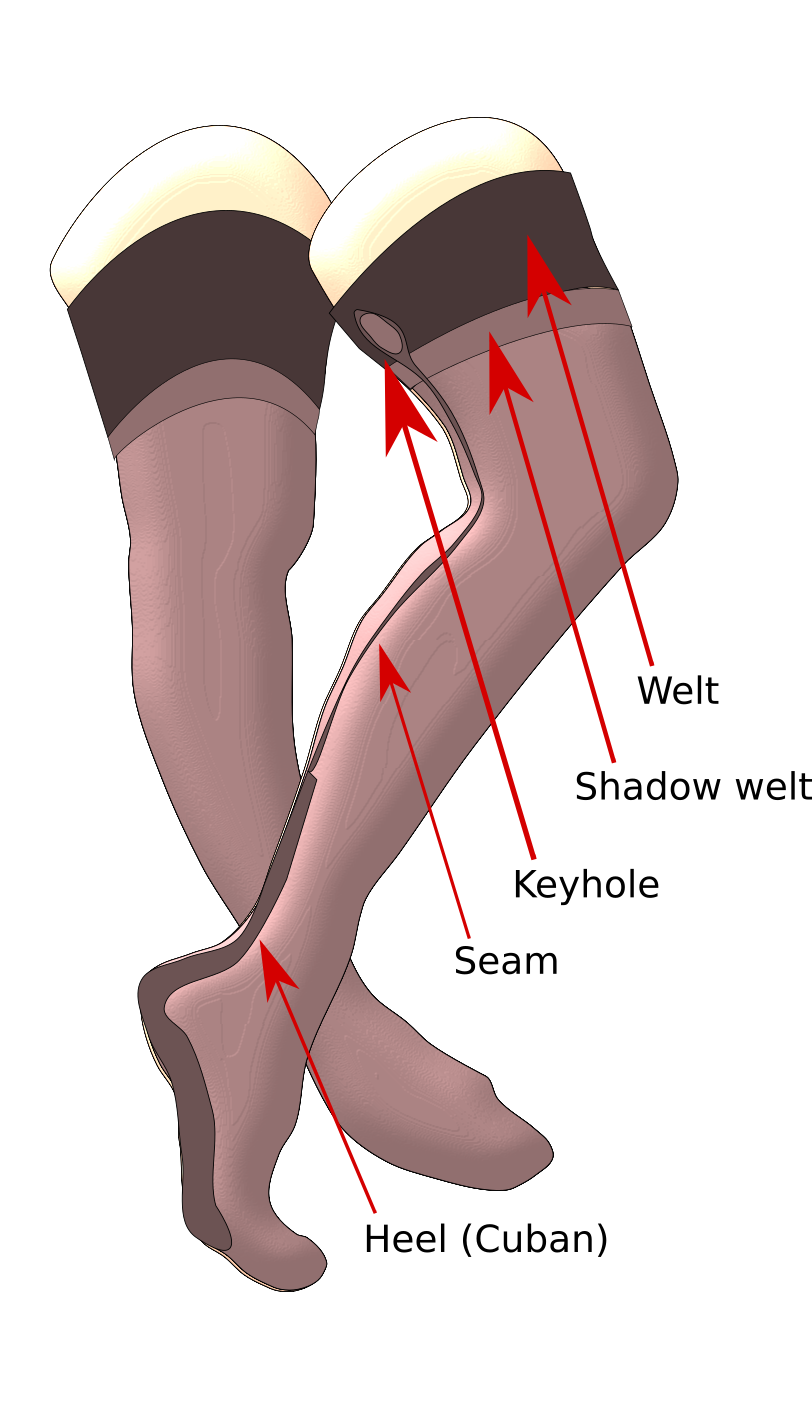
Characteristics of fully fashioned nylon stockings

Fully fashioned stockings (FFS), are stockings with characteristic reinforcements on the heel and top, a so-called keyhole at the back of the top, and a stitched back seam in between. They are made to be worn with a garter belt and are today considered a vintage design of hosiery after largely having been replaced by seamless stockings and pantyhose from the 1960s onwards. Fully fashioned stockings are usually made from nylon and thus have very little stretch compared with modern stockings and pantyhose.

== Description ==
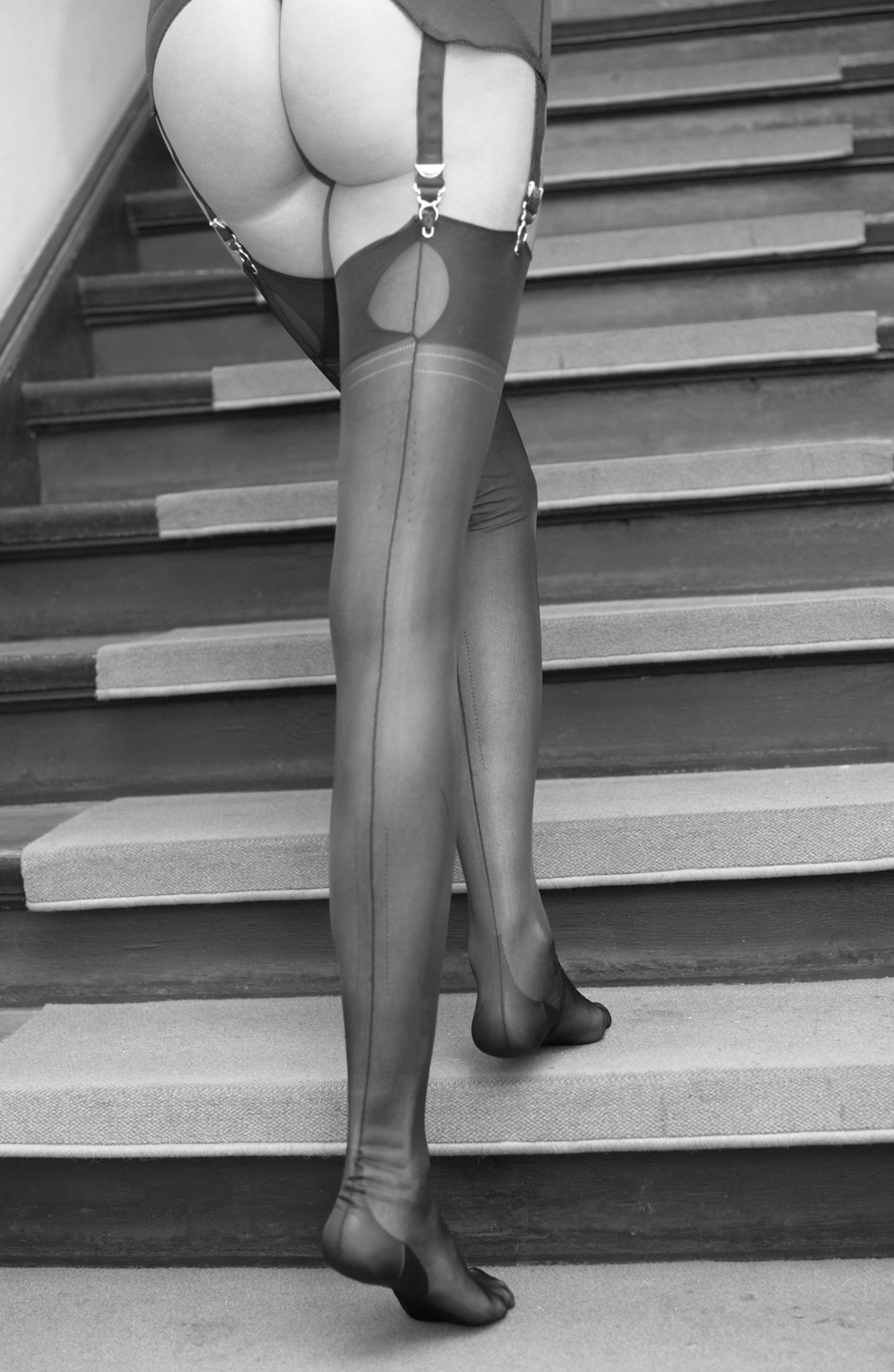
Fully-fashioned Point Heel stockings with the welt, shadow welt, keyhole, seam and heel reinforcement clearly visible

Fully fashioned stockings are usually knitted from sheer nylon yarn. To support the attachment of suspenders, they have a darker section of double fabric at the top, called the welt. This is followed by a lighter transitional section called the shadow welt. The keyhole is visible in the middle of the seam at the back of the welt. The back seam is an integral part of the stocking and not sewn on afterwards.

Fully fashioned stockings are sized to the height and shoe size (generally) of the wearer and have little or no stretch in them as they have no lycra (spandex) contained within the yarn.

In addition to the distinctive seam they also come in a number of heel designs. The most common are the French or Point Heel, where the reinforcement ends in a sharp point, and the Cuban Heel, which ends in a truncated point.

== Manufacturing ==
Fully fashioned knitting means that a garment is shaped by increasing and decreasing the number of stitches in a row.

Fully fashioned stockings are made from sections of nylon fabric that are knitted flat from the top down in the shape of a profile view of a leg. These are then sewn together in the back forming the seam. The top is folded and sewn back on itself forming the welt and the shadow welt, with a finishing loop applied, forming the keyhole, to allow the needle sewing the seam to be withdrawn. Additional layers of nylon are added to reinforce the sole and heel.

Fully fashioned stockings are produced by a limited number manufacturers.

== History ==
Fully fashioned stockings rose to prominence in the market during the 1940s (peaking in the 1950s) with the introduction of Nylon, with over 780,000 pairs sold on the first day and 64 million in the first year of North American sales alone. They remained popular until the introduction of Lycra in 1958 and mini-skirts shortly after.

Heel styles now vary from the original French (pyramidal) or point heel which was made most famous by the Aristoc Point Heel design to the Cuban and Havana heels – darkened reinforced heel design finishing in a square top rather than pointed top – the Cuban heel being defined by being much thinner and finishing higher up the calf than the Havana heel.
