= Men in tights =

Men in tights can refer to:

- Pantyhose for men, hosiery worn by men
- Robin Hood: Men in Tights, a 1993 American adventure comedy film
