= Bare legs =

State of a person's legs not being covered with clothing

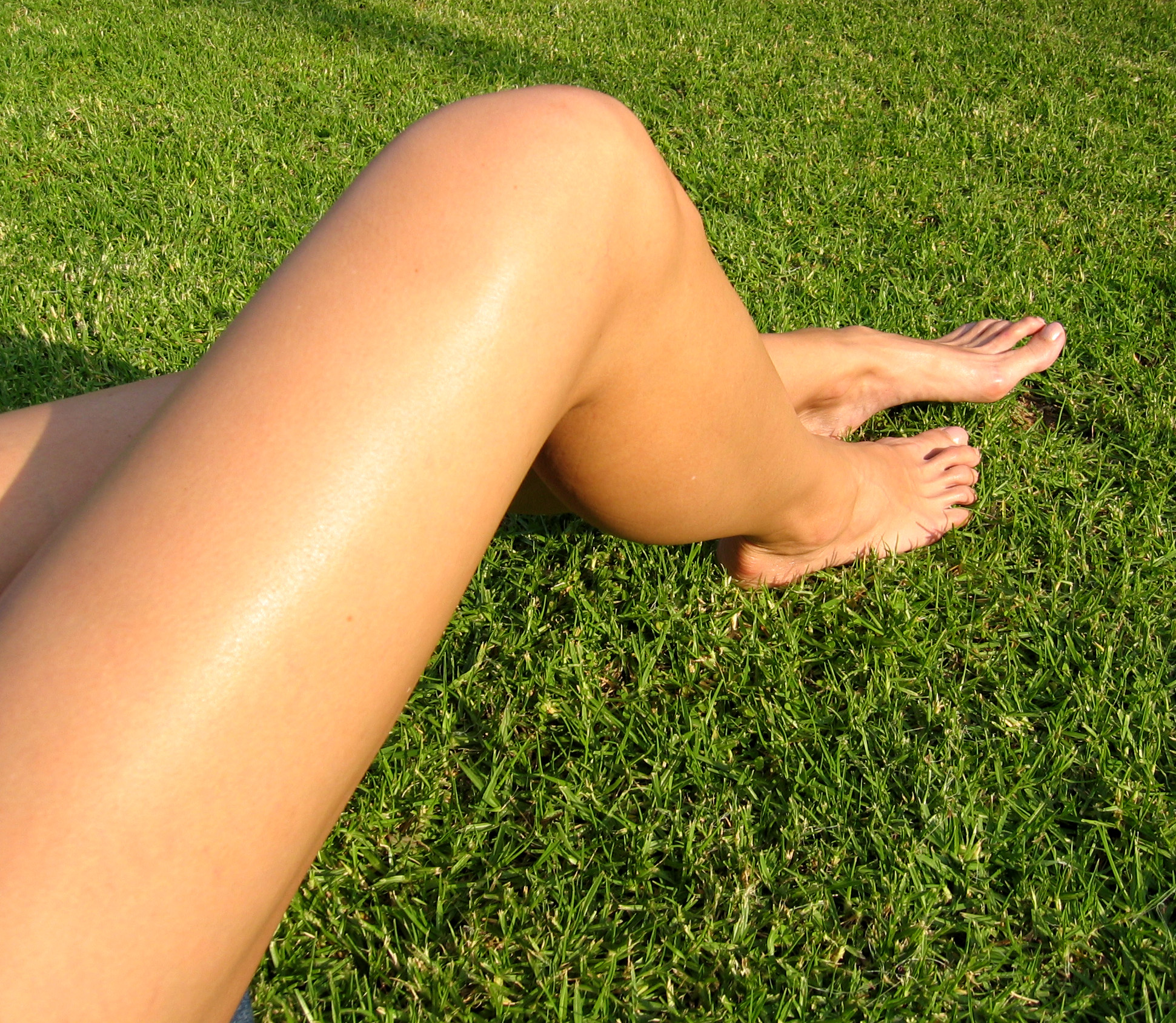
Bare legs

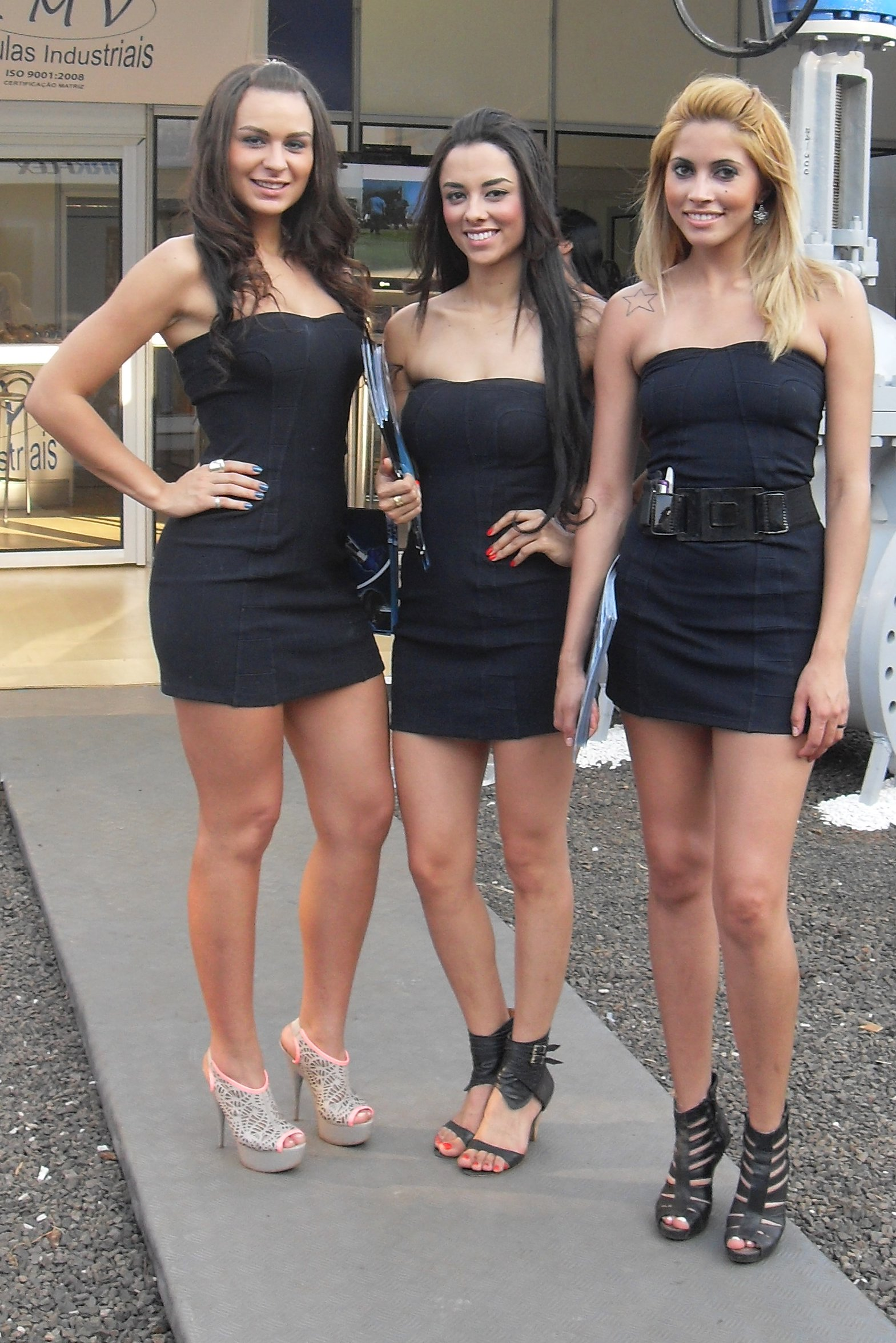
Models wearing little black dresses with bare legs in Brazil, 2010

Bare legs is the state in which a person does not cover their legs with any clothing. A person may have bare legs for functional reasons, such as to keep cooler in hot weather or during physical exercise. Most modern swimwear is worn without any leg covering (exemplified by the speedo, bikini, trunks and fundoshi).

The increased popularity of higher hemlines in women's clothing has resulted in increased and increasing exposure of legs. Initially, the shortened dresses were associated with the popularity of legwear which continued to cover the legs wholly or in part, such as socks and stockings. The introduction of the miniskirt and the microskirt saw a change to pantyhose or tights and other leggings. However, there has been an increasing trend towards women not wearing any legwear with short dresses and skirts, and high hemlines, except on formal occasions.

== History ==
Bare legs have gone in and out of fashion many times in different cultures around the world. Examples of this fashion can be found as far back as 1066 with the Norman peasant class commonly baring their legs.

Bare legs in England were a source of contention during the 1929 Wimbledon women's tennis tournament where a ban was considered and then ultimately rejected by English authorities, bare legs in women's tennis being the norm in both France and the United States at the time. Whilst western women's fashions through the first half of the 20th century and beyond gradually made the revealing of the leg acceptable or even the norm, the absence of any covering was often seen as having particular sexual connotations.

The popularity of pantyhose grew into a wardrobe staple throughout the 1970s and 1980s. From 1995 a steady decline in sales of pantyhose began, levelling off in 2006 with American sales less than half of what they had once been. This decline has been attributed to bare legs in fashion, changes in workplace dress code, and the increased popularity of trousers.
