= Ultra sheer =

Type of stocking

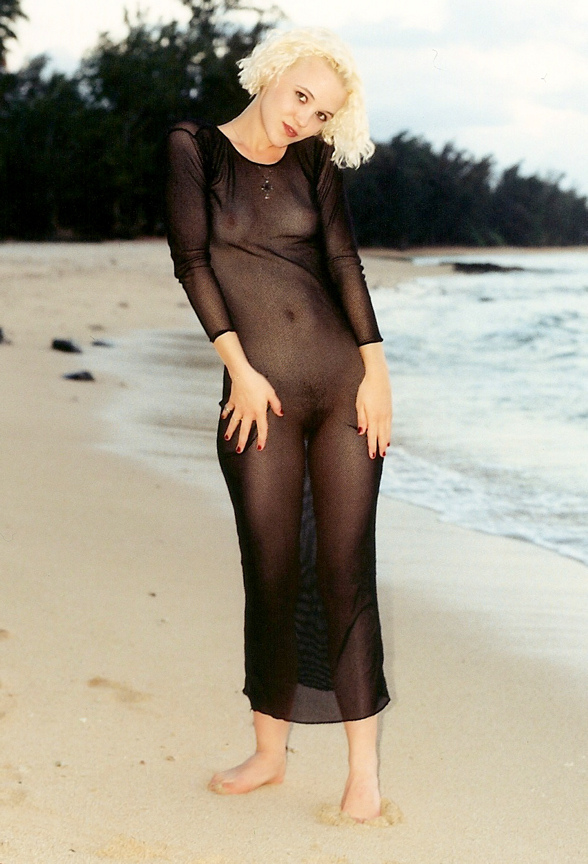
A woman wearing ultra sheer fabric on a beach

Ultra sheer refers to very light deniers of stockings or pantyhose, usually 10 or less. The denier of a stocking refers to the thickness of the nylon yarn used in the fabric. The greater the denier, the more durable the material and less prone to tearing (or "getting a run"). Ultra sheer stockings have a very light transparency and a high sheen.

== See also ==
- Net (textile)
- See-through clothing
