= Nylon riots =

Fashion-based social unrest in the 20th-century

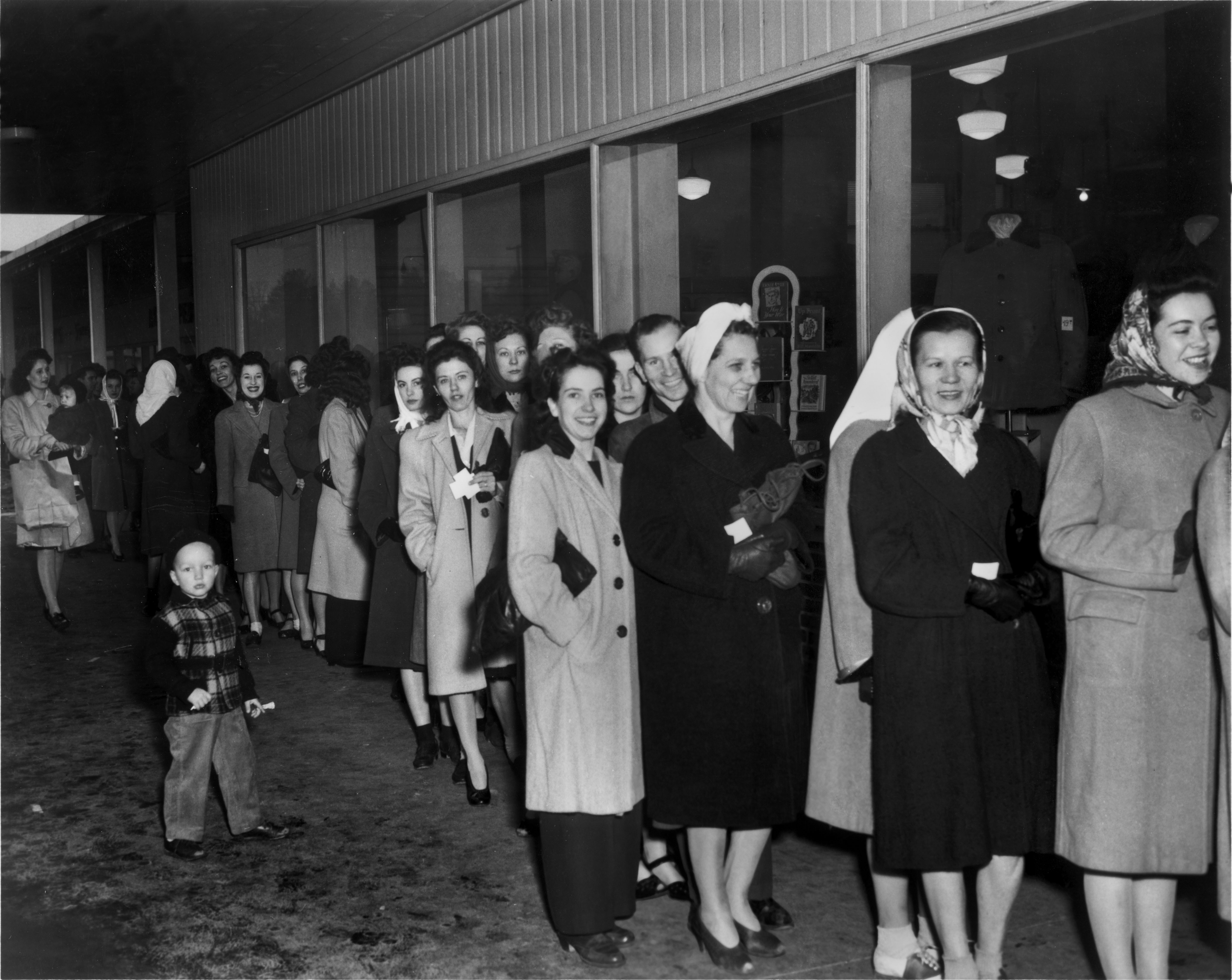
Women standing in line for nylon stockings outside Miller's Department Store in Oak Ridge in January 1946.

The nylon riots were a series of disturbances at American stores created by a nylon stocking shortage.

== Background ==
Nylon was patented by DuPont in 1935. The company began manufacturing nylon stockings in 1939, and introduced them to the world at the 1939 World's Fair, worn by a model called "Miss Chemistry". The product quickly became popular in the United States, with up to 4 million pairs of stockings bought in one day.

During World War II (1939–1945), nylon was used extensively for parachutes and other war materials, such as airplane cords and ropes. As a result, the supply of nylon consumer goods was curtailed.

The riots occurred between August 1945 and March 1946, when the War Production Board announced that the creation of DuPont's nylon would shift its manufacturing from wartime material to nylon stockings, at the same time launching a promotional campaign. In one of the worst disturbances, in Pittsburgh, 40,000 women queued up for 13,000 pairs of stockings, which led to fights breaking out. It took several months before DuPont was able to ramp up production to meet demand, but until they did many women went without nylon stockings for months.

== Wartime "stocking panic" ==
During World War II, embargoes against Japan resulted in the United States having difficulty importing silk from Japan. Eventually, the U.S. was unable to import any silk. So, DuPont thought of an idea to convince the army that nylon is a much more effective material than silk. DuPont succeeded in convincing the army, and nylon fabric became increasingly popular because of its elasticity, shrink-proof, and moth-proof material properties.

Nylon stockings became increasingly popular on the black market, selling for up to $20 (worth about $438 today) per pair. Women who could not acquire nylons resorted to lotions, makeup, creams, stick cakes, and painting seam lines down their legs to give the illusion of stockings. Spray-on nylon "liquid hosiery" products were also used.

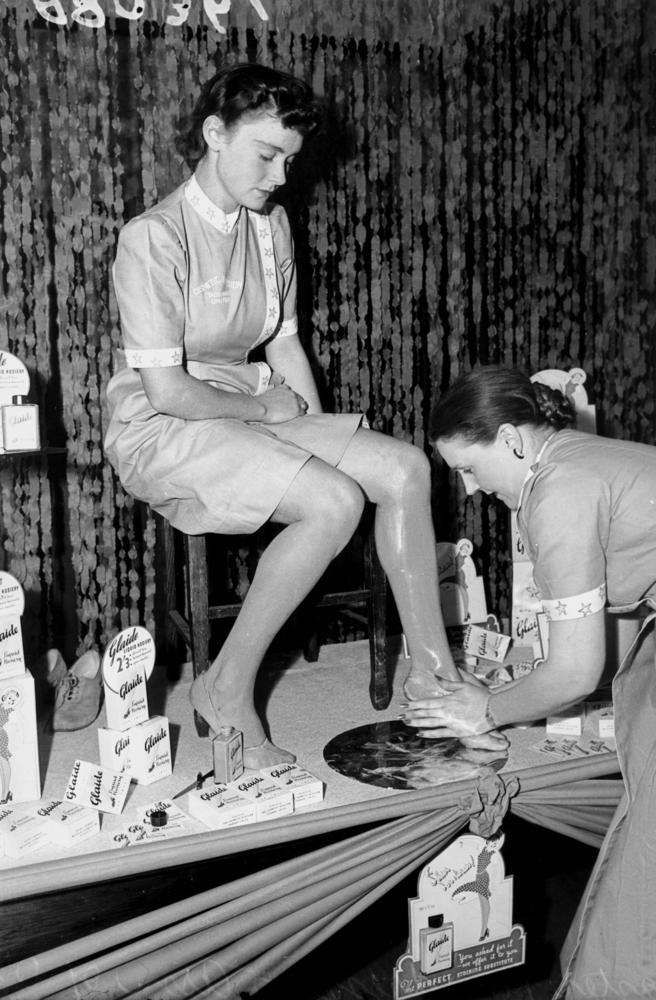
Liquid hosiery being applied to a woman's legs, Brisbane, 1941

Because nylon stockings were so widely sought-after, they also became a target of theft. In Louisiana, one household was robbed of 18 pairs of nylons. Similarly, robbery was ruled out as the motive of a murder in Chicago because the nylons were untouched.

George Marion Jr. and Fats Waller's song "When the Nylons Bloom Again" described this situation in poetic terms:

Gone are the days when I'd answer the bell
Find a salesman with stockings to sell
Gleam in his eye and measuring tape in his hand
I get the urge to go splurging on hose
Nylons a dozen of those
Now poor or rich we're enduring instead
Woolens which itch
Rayons that spread

I'll be happy when the nylons bloom again
Cotton is monotonous to men
Only way to keep affection fresh
Get some mesh for your flesh
I'll be happy when the nylons bloom again
Ain't no need to blow no sirens then

When the frozen hosen can appear
Man that means all clear

Working women of the USA and Britain
Humble dowager or lowly debutant
We'll be happy as puppy or a kitten
Stepping back into their nylons of DuPont

Keep on smiling to the nylons bloom again
And the WACS come back to join their men
In a world that Mr. Wallace planned
Strolling hand in hand

— George Marion Jr. and Fats Waller, "When the Nylons Bloom Again"

== End of the war and beginning of riots ==
In August 1945, eight days after Japan's surrender, DuPont announced that it would resume producing stockings and newspaper headlines cheered "Peace, It's Here! Nylons on Sale!" DuPont's announcement indicated that nylons would be available in September and the motto "Nylons by Christmas" was sung everywhere. DuPont originally forecast that it would be able to produce 360 million pairs per year. The shortage remained as DuPont under-delivered on that estimate, and caused mad rushes once stock was made available.

The first riot occurred in September 1945 when a small post-war shipment of stockings went on limited sale around the country. In June, 30,000 or 40,000 women in Pittsburgh queued up for a mere 13,000 pairs that were designated for "working girls" only. In November, 30,000 women lined up for stockings in New York. In San Francisco, a sale was called off in San Francisco after around 10,000 shoppers who were waiting to get in broke the store window, prompting several women to faint. The shortage persisted into 1946, but by March, DuPont was finally able to ramp up production and began churning out 30 million pairs of stockings a month. Widespread availability of the stockings ended the period of 'nylon riots'.

== Accusations ==
During the shortage, many people began to suspect that DuPont was deliberately delaying production and the shortage was a result of artificial scarcity. DuPont's factories were actually operating at full capacity, but nonetheless, public discontent remained high. Reporters suggested the company was being greedy and unpatriotic for maintaining exclusive patent and production rights to a substance in such popular demand. In 1945, an ad appeared in Knit Goods Weekly that called on readers and other retailers to write to their congressmen in protest.

In light of the public scandal, DuPont attempted to publicly shame 'selfish housewives' hoarding stock, which only brought more hostility towards DuPont. In 1951, after the riots had long subsided, DuPont was threatened with an antitrust suit. To avoid a long trial, they then agreed to share nylon licensing with the Chemstrand Corporation, followed by more licensees.

== See also ==
- History of clothing and textiles
- United States home front during World War II
- Women in World War II
