= Stocking =

Hosiery that covers the feet and legs to the knee or higher

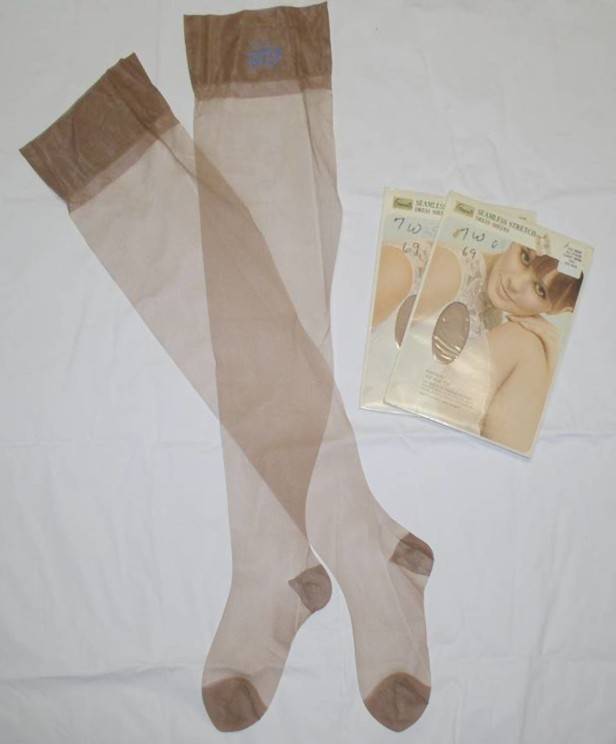
- A pair of nylon stockings
- Material: Chiefly nylon, silk, wool, cotton, rayon

Stockings (also known as hose, especially in a historical context) are close-fitting, variously elastic garments covering the leg from the foot up to the knee or possibly part or all of the thigh. Also it can cover up to the hips. Stockings vary in color, design, and transparency. Today, stockings are primarily worn for fashion and aesthetics, usually in association with mid-length or short skirts.

== History ==
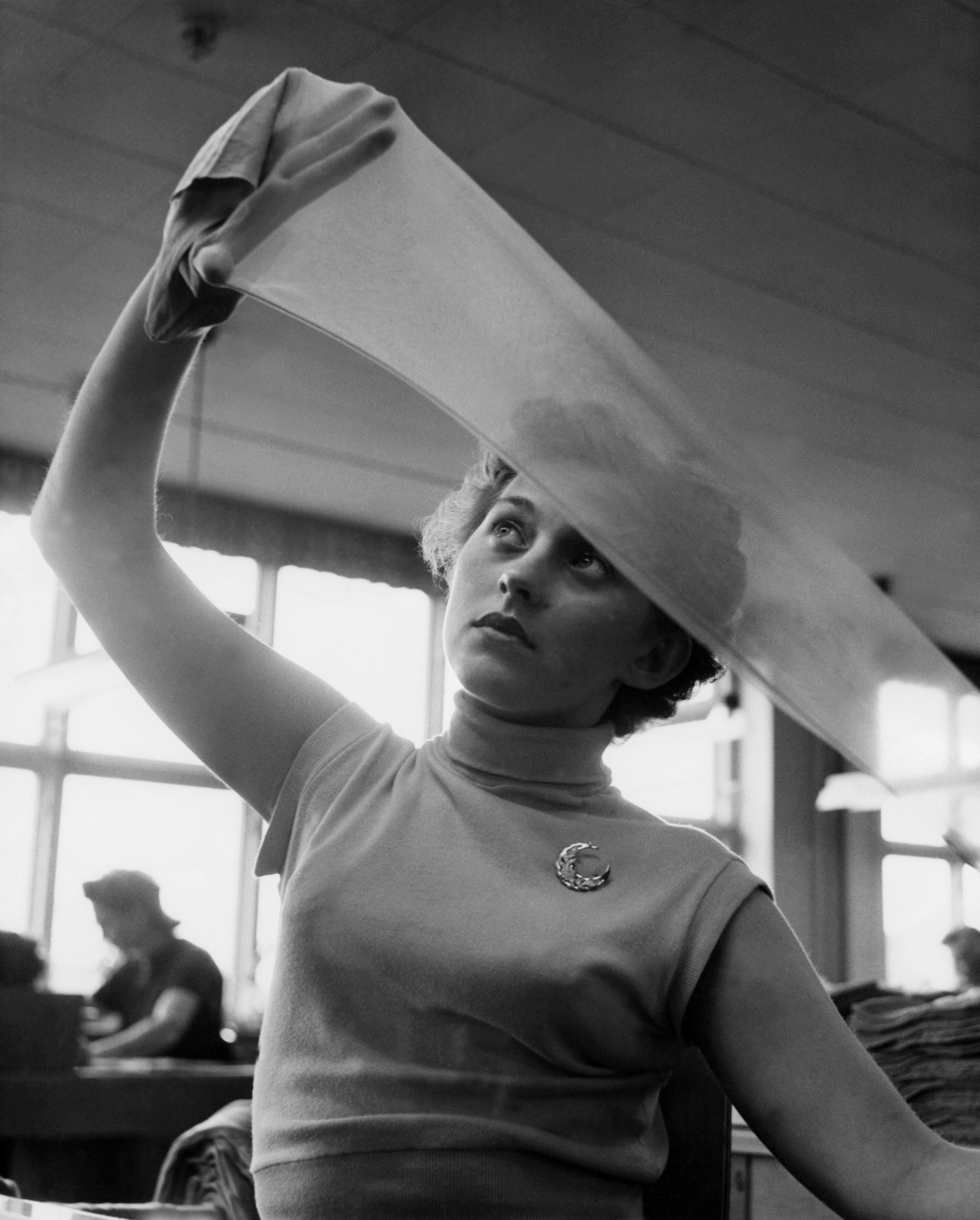
Examining the quality of nylon stockings, Malmö clothing factory, Sweden, 1954

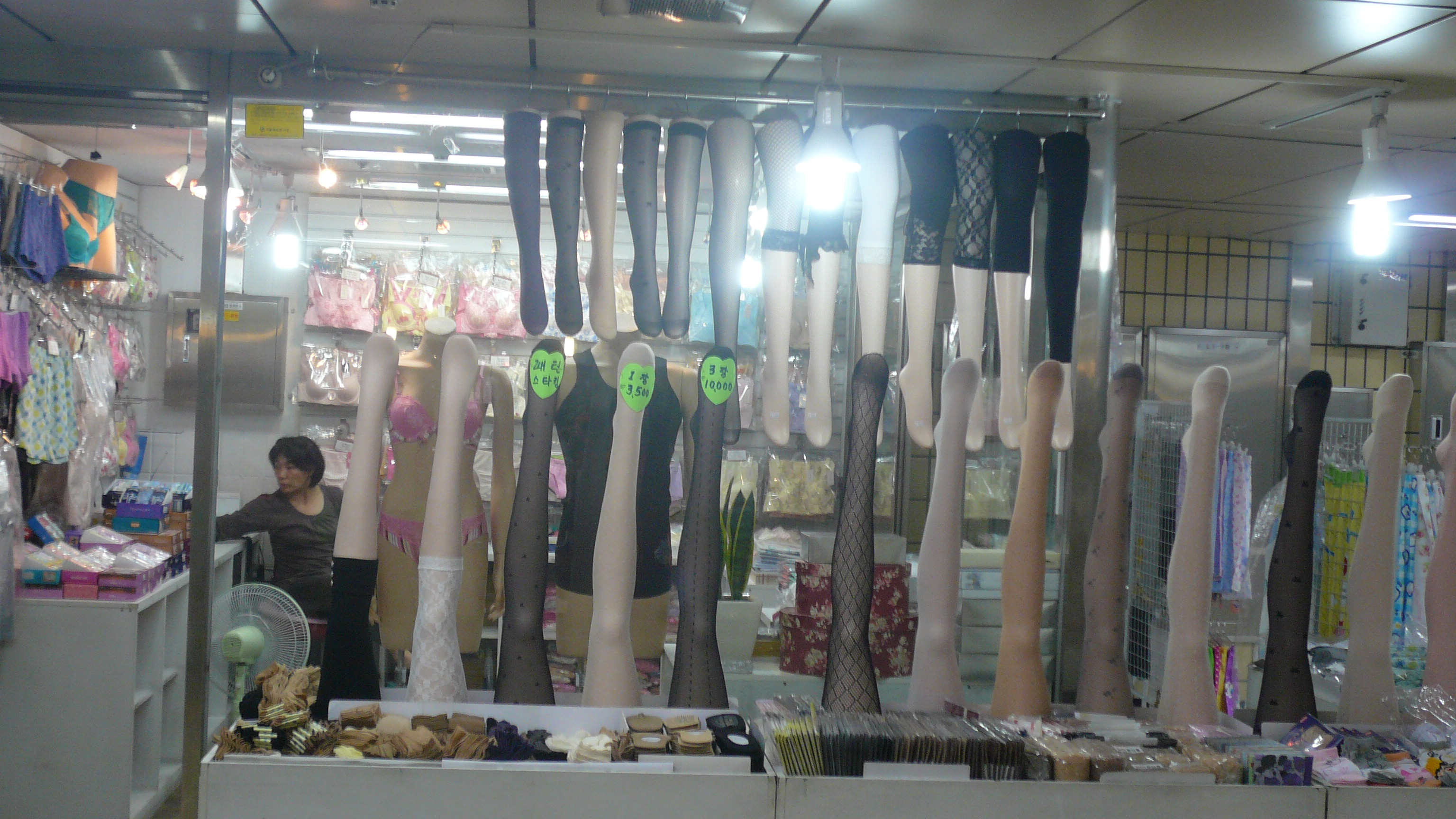
Stockings on display for sale in South Korea

Historically, even though the word sock is at least as ancient in origin, what men normally wore in the medieval period were referred to as hose.

The word stock used to refer to the bottom "stump" part of the body, and by analogy the word was used to refer to the one-piece covering of the lower trunk and limbs of the 15th century—essentially tights consisting of the upper-stocks (later to be worn separately as knee breeches) and nether-stocks (later to be worn separately as stockings). (See Hose.)

In 1560, the merchant Thomas Gresham tried to buy silk hose ("sylke howsse") for Elizabeth I in Antwerp, but not finding any, instead sent her measurements to Spain for 20 pairs to be made. As a New Year's Day gift in January 1562, Sybil Penn gave Elizabeth I a pair of "silk knytt hoose". These were knitted silk stockings, and in subsequent years were supplied by the queen's silkwoman Alice Montague.

Before the 1590s, stockings were knitted by hand or constructed from woven cloth. Knitted stockings were preferred because of their flexibility. The first knitting machines were for making stockings. The stockings themselves were made of cotton, linen, wool or silk. A polished cotton called lisle was common, as were those made in the town of Balbriggan.

Before the 1920s, stockings, if worn, were worn for warmth. In the 1920s, as hemlines of dresses rose and central heating was not widespread, women began to wear flesh-colored stockings to cover their exposed legs. Those stockings were sheer, first made of silk or rayon (then known as "artificial silk") and after 1940 of nylon.

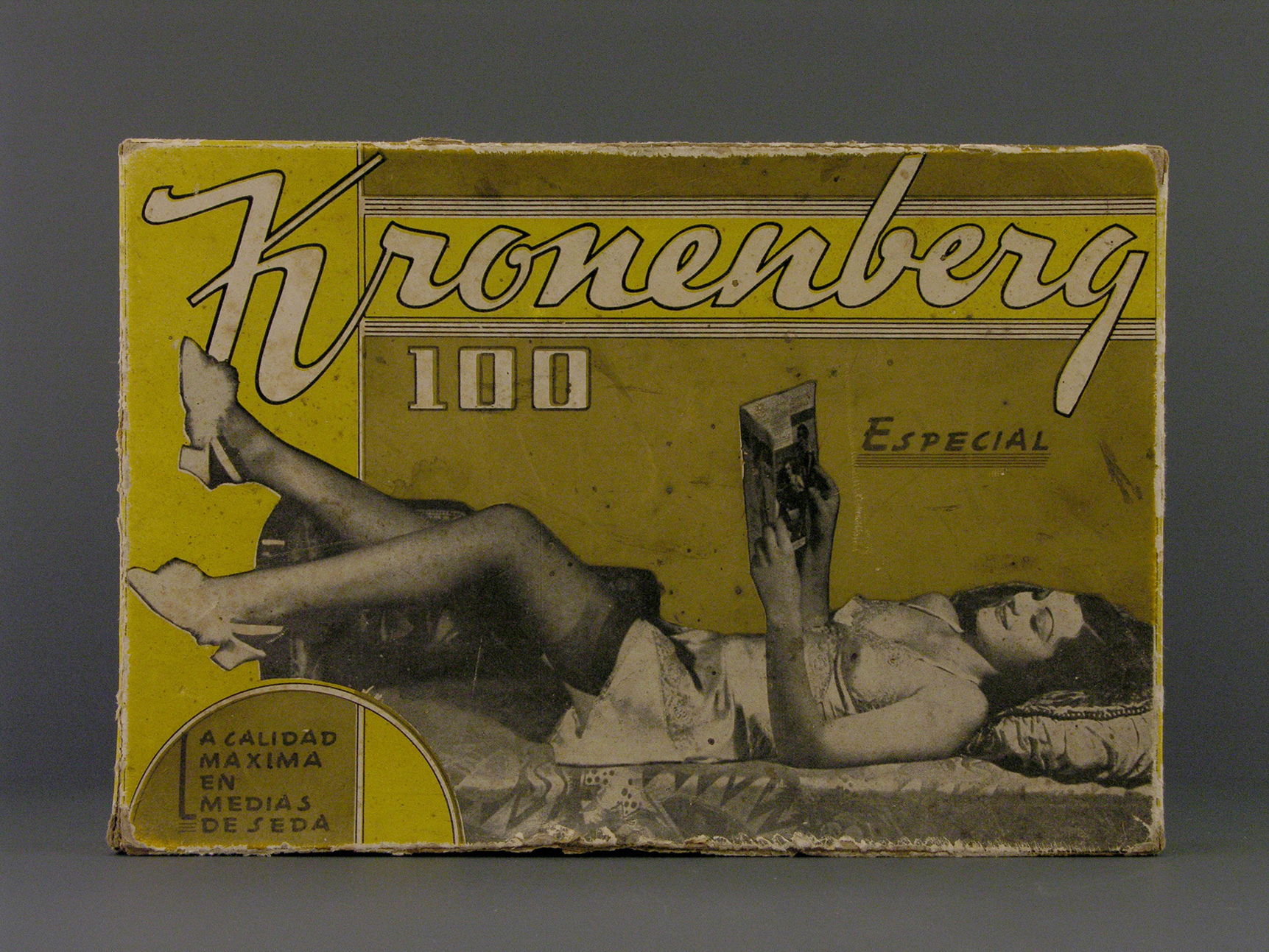
Kronenberg brand stocking from mid-20th century

The introduction of nylon in 1939 by chemical company DuPont began a high demand for stockings in the United States with up to 4 million pairs being purchased in one day. Nylon stockings were cheap, durable, and sheer compared to their cotton and silk counterparts. When America entered World War II, DuPont ceased production of nylon stockings and retooled their factories to produce parachutes, airplane cords, and rope. This led to a shortage and the creation of a black market for stockings. At the end of the war DuPont announced that the company would return to producing stockings, but could not meet demand. This led to a series of disturbances in American stores known as the nylon riots until DuPont was able to increase production.

A precursor of pantyhose made an appearance in the 1940s and 1950s, when film and theater productions had stockings sewn to the briefs of actresses and dancers, according to actress-singer-dancer Ann Miller and seen in popular films such as Daddy Long Legs. Today, stockings are commonly made using knitted wool, silk, cotton or nylon (see hosiery). The introduction of commercial pantyhose in 1959 gave an alternative to stockings, and the use of stockings declined dramatically. A main reason for this was the trend towards higher hemlines on dresses (see minidress). In 1970, U.S. sales of pantyhose exceeded stockings for the first time, and has remained this way ever since. Beginning in 1987, sales of pantyhose started a slight decline due to the newly invented hold-ups, but still remain the most sold kind of hosiery.

== Benefits and drawbacks ==
Stockings are still sometimes preferred to pantyhose in North American English, for a number of reasons. These may include the perception that stockings, and the associated use of garters, lace, high fashion, appliqué and the exposure of the thigh, are more aesthetically pleasing, or sexually attractive and alluring than pantyhose.

Both nylon stockings and pantyhose in being sheer share the advantage of being quick-drying compared to trousers. Spare pairs are also easy to carry if they are ruined. If laddered they can be replaced 'one at a time' which provides a cost advantage over tights.

However, stockings have a drawback in colder weather, because more skin is exposed to the cold compared to pantyhose. Also, pantyhose do not require garters or garter belts.

== Support ==
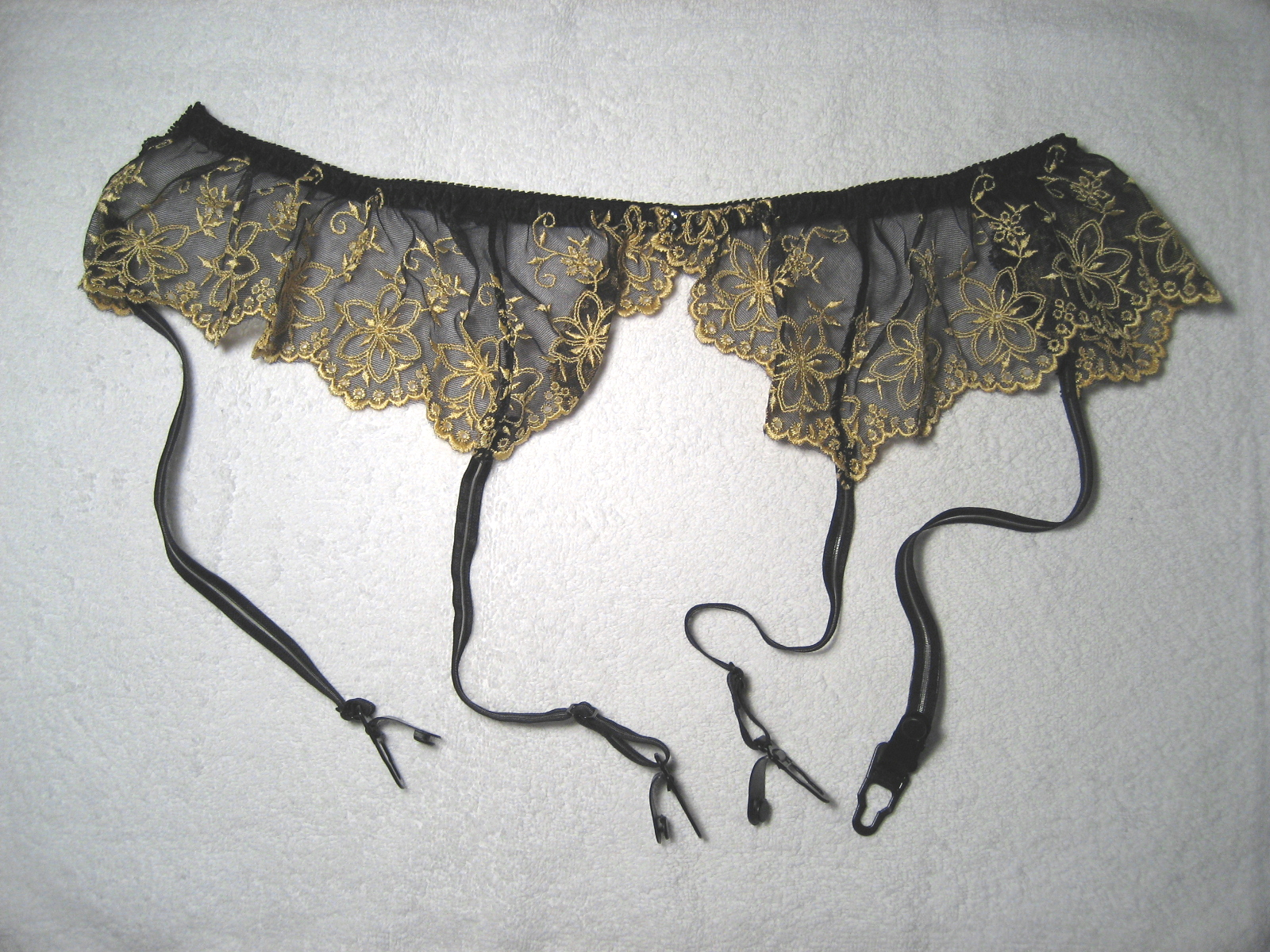
A garter belt with guipure lace

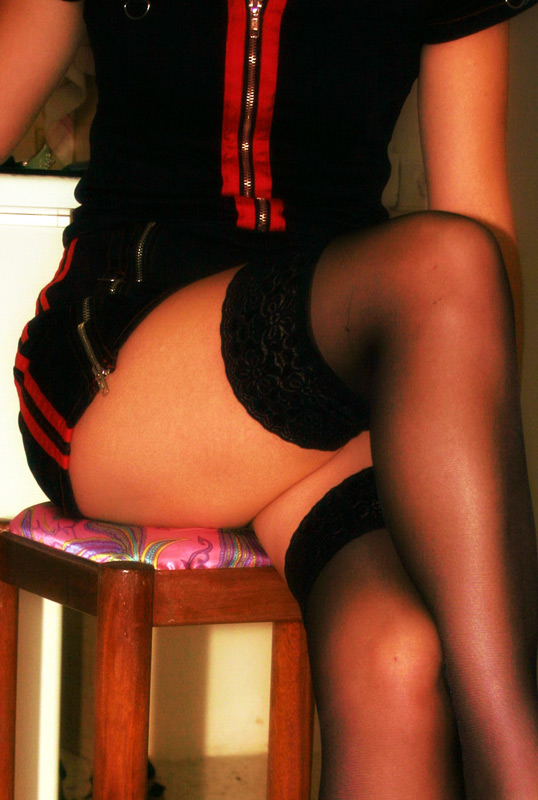
A woman wearing stay-up stockings held up by elastic

Stockings can be held up in one of three ways:

1. Hold-ups are the most common means of support. The inside of the top of the stockings has a band (typically silicone) of elastic or highly tractive material that resists slipping down the thigh.
2. A garter belt (AmE), or suspender belt or suspenders (BrE), is the second most common way of holding up stockings. It is a piece of underwear worn around the waist like a belt but under clothing which has "suspenders" or "stays" that clip to the tops of the stockings. Frequently, wearers opted for girdles that included the clips instead of a separate belt.
3. A garter is the least common means of support. It is slipped over the top of the stocking to hold the stocking by essentially clamping it to the leg. These are the garters typically worn by a bride at her wedding.

== Terminology ==
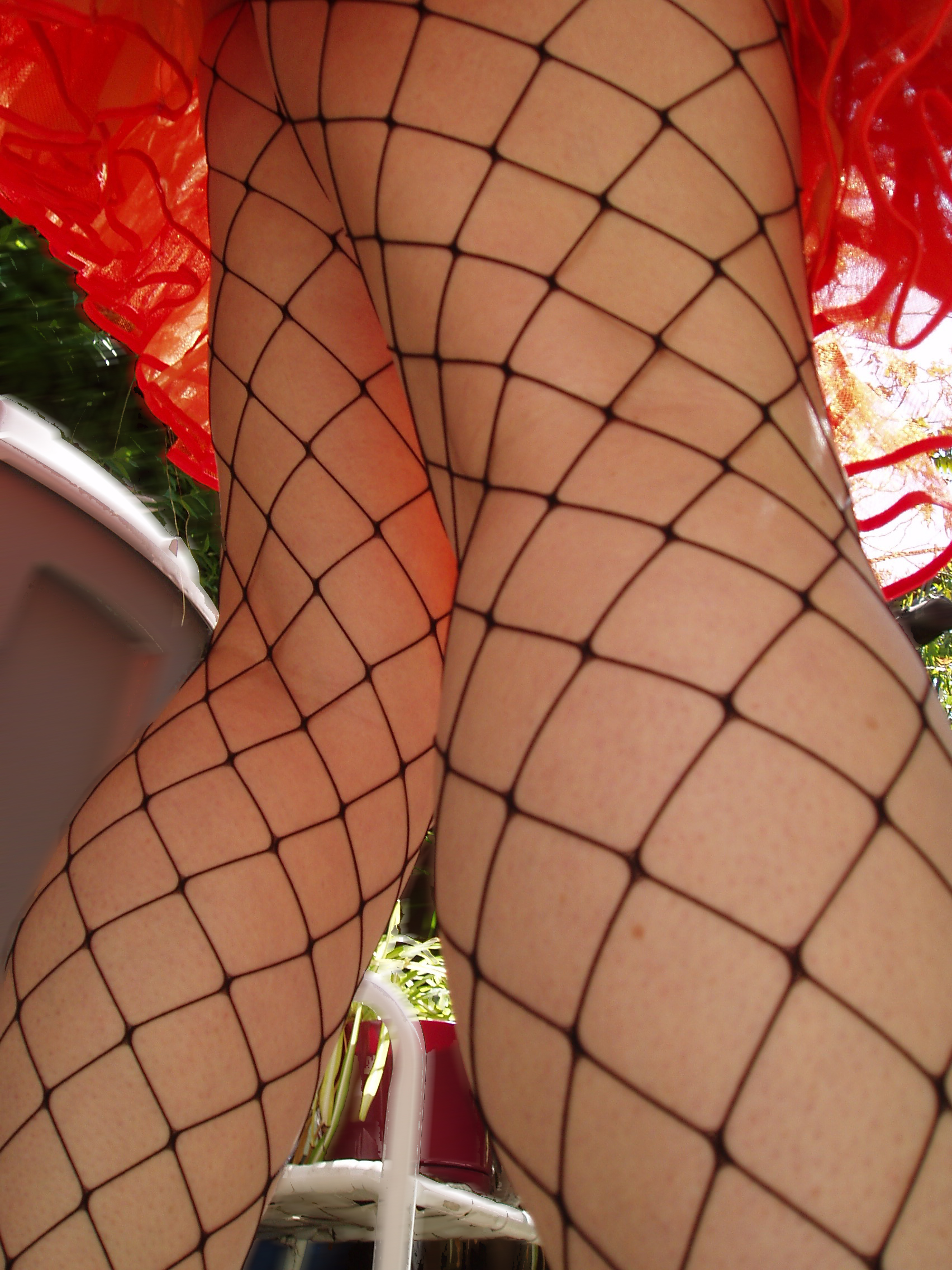
Fishnet hosiery

In modern usage, stocking specifically refers to the form of hosiery configured as two pieces, one for each leg (except for American and Australian English, where the term can also be a synonym for pantyhose). The terms hold-ups and thigh highs refer to stockings that stay up through the use of built-in elastic, while the word stockings is the general term or refers to the kind of stockings that need a suspender belt (garter belt, in American English), and are quite distinct from tights or pantyhose (American English).

Other terms used with stockings include:

- Cuban heel: A stocking with a heel made with folded over and sewn reinforcement.
- Demi-toe: Stockings which have a reinforced toe with half the coverage on top as on the bottom. This results in a reinforcement that covers only the tip of the toes as opposed to the whole toe. These can be with or without a reinforced heel.
- Denier: The lower the denier number the sheerer the garment. Stockings knitted with a higher denier tend to be less sheer but more durable.
- Fishnet: Knitted stockings with a very wide open knit resembling a fish net.
- Fencenet: Similar to fishnet, but with a much wider pattern. These are sometimes worn over another pair of stockings or pantyhose, such as matte or opaque, with a contrasting colour. Sometimes referred to as whalenets.
- Football stockings: typically made out of heavy cotton or a thick, durable synthetic fabric that reaches the knee.
- Full Fashioned: Fully fashioned stockings are knitted flat, the material is then cut and the two sides are then united by a seam up the back. Fully fashioned stockings were the most popular style until the 1960s.
- Hold-ups (British English) or Stay-ups: Stockings that are held up by sewn-in elasticated bands (quite often a wide lace top band). In the US they are referred to as thigh-highs.
- Knee highs: Stockings that terminate at or just barely below the knee. Also known as half-stockings, trouser socks, or socks.
- Matte: Stockings which have a dull or non-lustre finish.
- Mock seam: A false seam sewn into the back of a seamless stocking.
- Nude heel: Stockings without reinforcement in the heel area.
- Opaque: Stockings made of yarn which give them a heavier appearance (usually 40 denier or greater).
- Point heel: in a Fully Fashioned stocking it is a heel in which the reinforced part ends in a triangle shape.
- RHT: Abbreviation of reinforced heel and toe.
- Open-toed: Stockings that stop at the base of the toe with a piece that goes between the first and second toes to hold them down. They can be worn with some open-toed shoes, especially to show off pedicured toes.
- Sandalfoot: Stockings with a nude toe, meaning no heavier yarn in the toe than is in the leg. They are intended to be worn with sandal or open-toe shoes.
- Seamed: Stockings manufactured in the old Full-Fashioned manner with a seam running up the back of the leg. In the past they were manufactured by cutting the fabric and then sewing it together.
- Seamless: Stockings knit in one operation on circular machines (one continuous operation) so that no seaming is required up the back.
- Sheers: Stockings generally of a 15 to 20 denier.
- Contrast Tops: Stockings with a different colour top to the main stocking, such as black tops with a natural beige colour stocking
- Stocking Feet: Shoeless feet covered by stockings or socks.
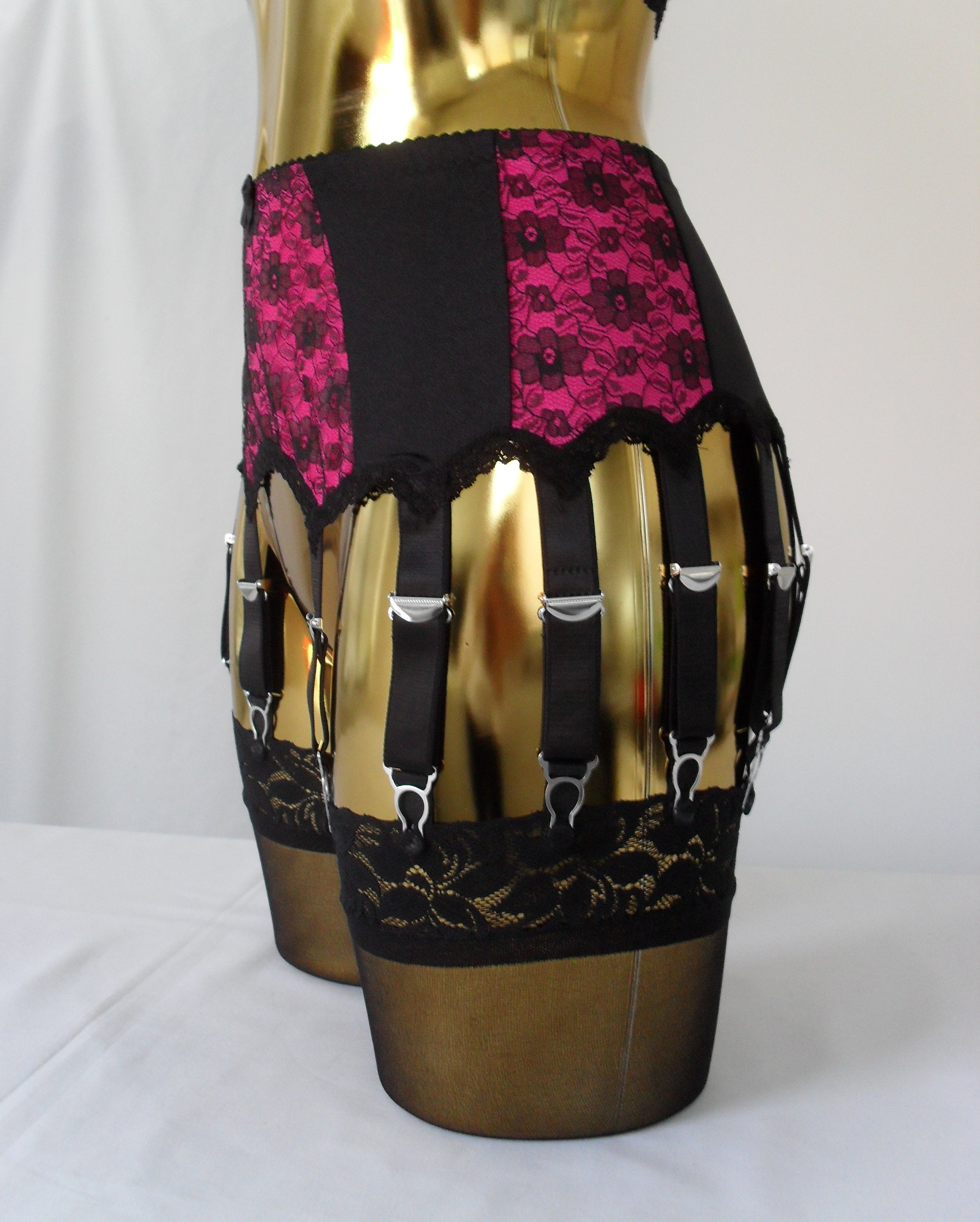
- 14 Strap Burlesque style Suspender Belt
  Suspender belt (British English) or Garter belt (American English): a belt with straps to keep stockings (not hold-ups) in place: usually they have 4 or 6 straps, but may have from 8 to as many as 14 straps. Suspender Belts with 12 or 14 straps are often associated with the Burlesque style and era.
- Ultra sheer: A fine denier fiber which gives the ultimate in sheerness. Usually 10 denier but can be as low as 1 denier.
- Welt: A fabric knitted separately and machine-sewn to the top of a stocking. Knit in a heavier denier yarn and folded double to give strength for supporter fastening.

== See also ==
- Bodystocking
- Fully fashioned stockings
- Hold-ups
- Leggings
- Nylon riots
- Pantyhose
- Sock
- Stocking fetishism
- Tabi
- Tights
- Zettai ryōiki
