= Hosiery =

Legwear for the feet and legs

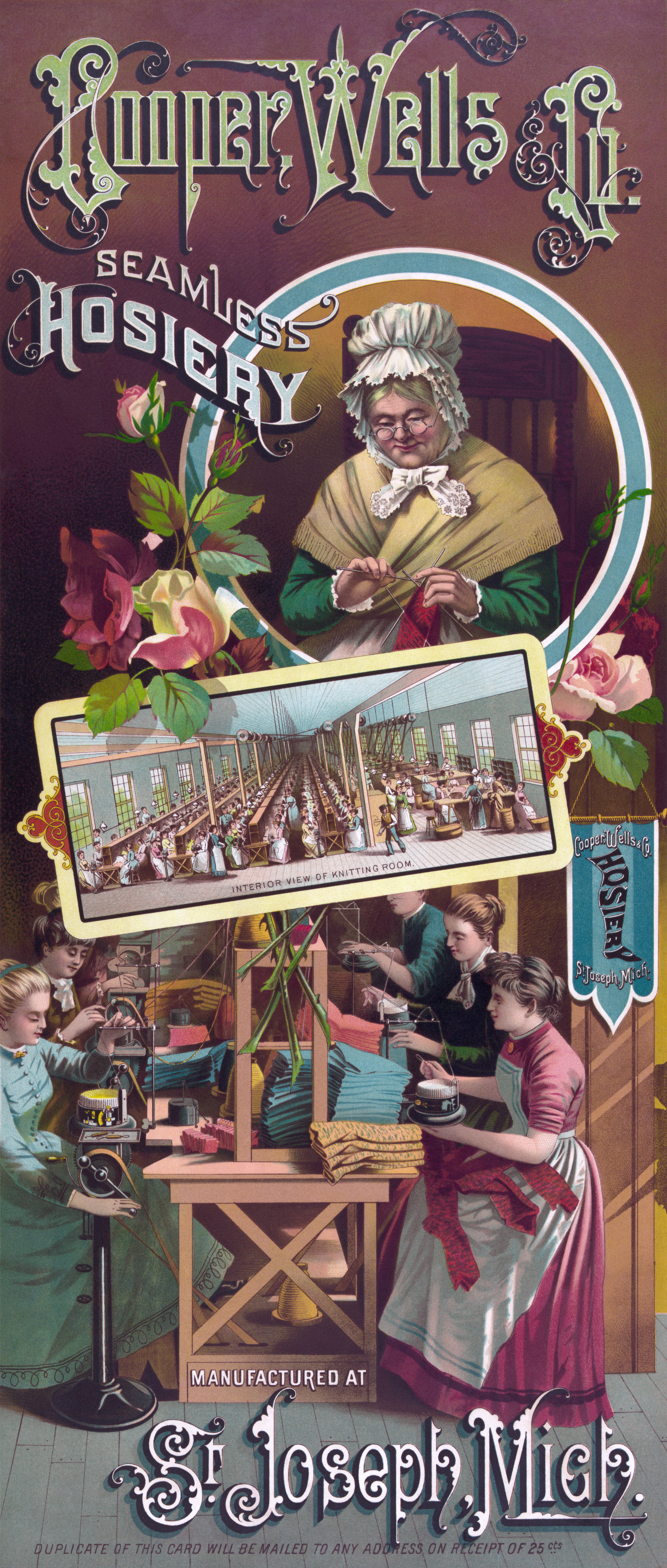
This 1886 advertisement for a hosiery factory demonstrates both handmade construction and factory production with nineteenth-century technology.

Hosiery, (UK: /ˈhoʊziəri/, US: /-ʒəri/) also referred to as legwear, describes garments worn directly on the feet and legs. The term originated as the collective term for products of which a maker or seller is termed a hosier; and those products are also known generically as hose. The term is also used for all types of knitted fabric, and its thickness and weight is defined by denier or opacity. Lower denier measurements of 5 to 15 describe a hose which may be sheer in appearance, whereas styles of 40 and above are dense, with little to no light able to come through on 100 denier items.

== Etymology ==
The word hosiery is a morphological derivation of the Anglo-Saxon word ''hosa'', which meant a woven garment for the lower body and legs.

== Overview ==
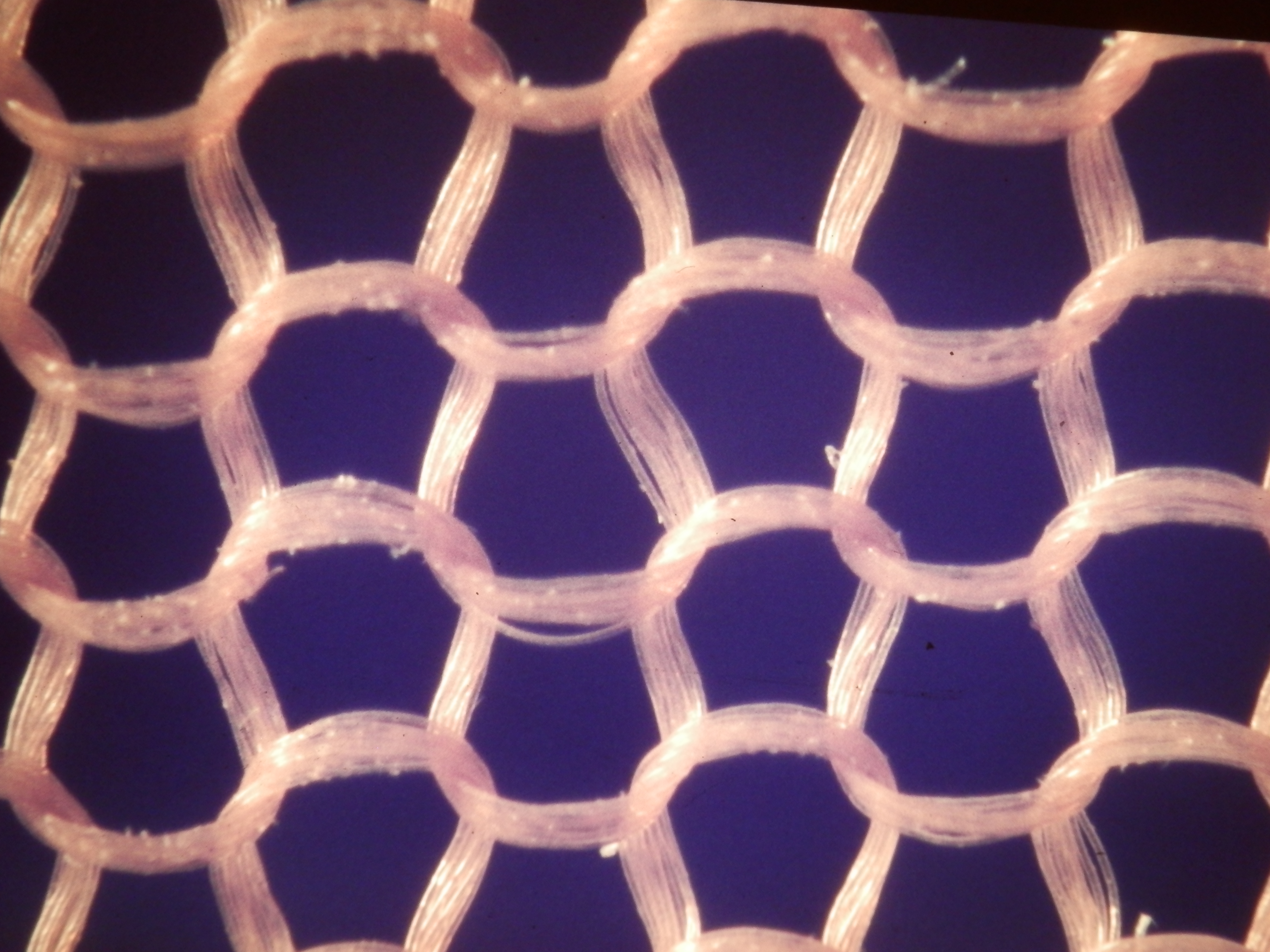
Close-up photograph of knitted nylon hosiery

The first references to hosiery can be found in the works of Hesiod, where Romans are said to have used leather or cloth in forms of strips to cover their lower body parts. Even the Egyptians are speculated to have used hosiery, as socks have been found in certain tombs.

Most hosiery garments are made by knitting methods. Modern hosiery is usually tight-fitting by virtue of stretchy fabrics and meshes. Older forms include binding to achieve a tight fit. Due to its close fit, most hosiery can be worn as an undergarment, but it is more commonly worn as a combined under/outer garment.

Hosiery garments are the product of hosiery fabric produced from hosiery yarn. Like the yarn used for making woven fabric, hosiery yarn comes from a separate spinning (yarn making) process, and is used with circular knitting machines to form fabric. One or more hosiery yarn is used to make knitted or hosiery fabric, and garments produced out of this are generally referred to as hosiery garments.

== Types ==
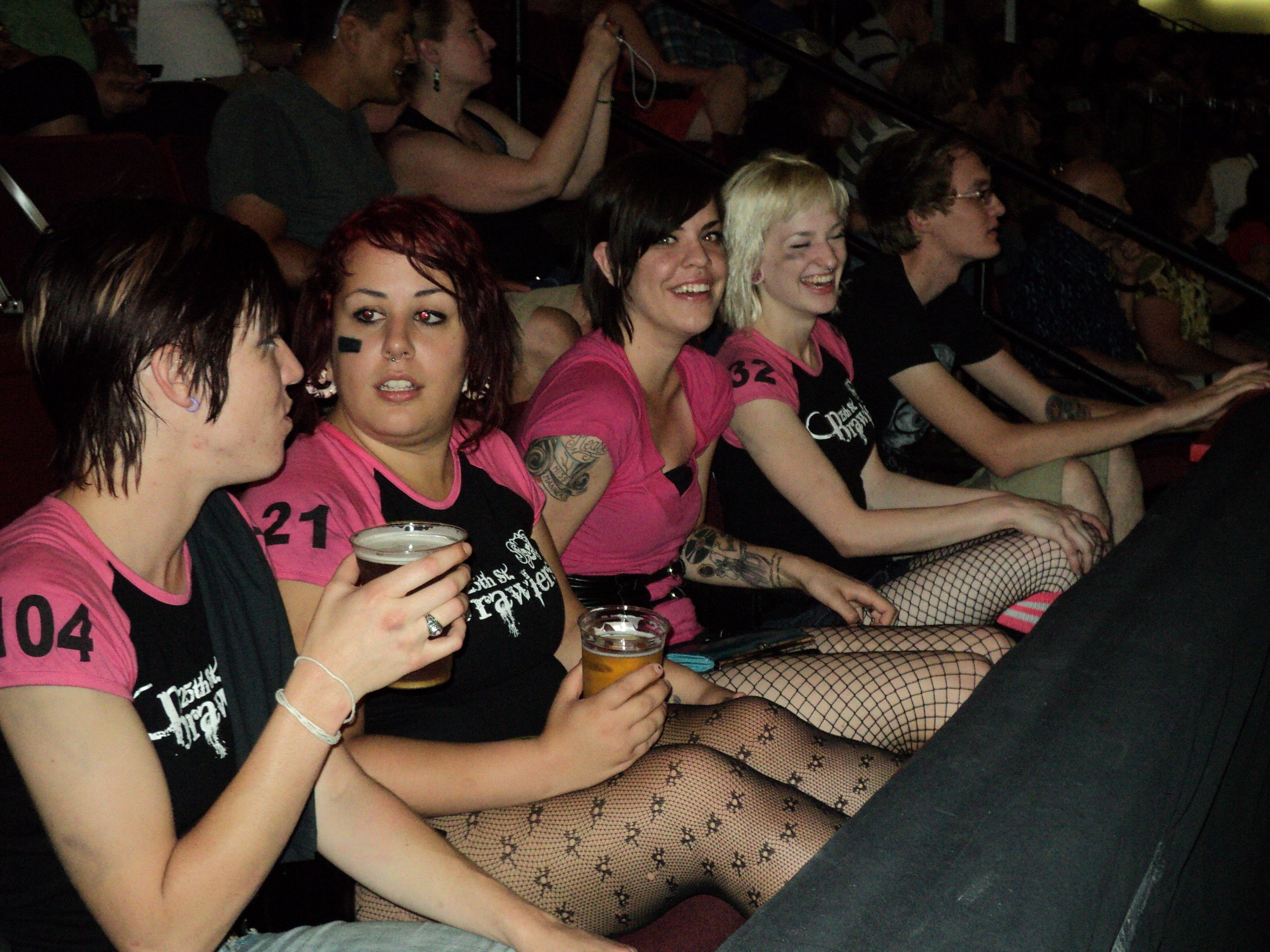
Roller derby athletes shortly after a bout in Boise, Idaho, wearing fishnet and patterned pantyhose.

- Bodystockings
- Compression stockings, a.k.a. support stockings
- Hold-ups (British English), stay-ups (British English) or thigh-high stockings (American English)
- Hosen (clothing)
- Knee highs
- Leggings, or yoga pants
- Socks, tube socks (American English), knee-highs and over-the-knees
- Stockings, held by a suspender belt
- Tights (British English; also common in American usage) or pantyhose (American English)
- Toe socks
- Legwarmers

== See also ==
- Pantyhose for men
- Undergarment
