= Hold-ups =

Thigh-high stockings

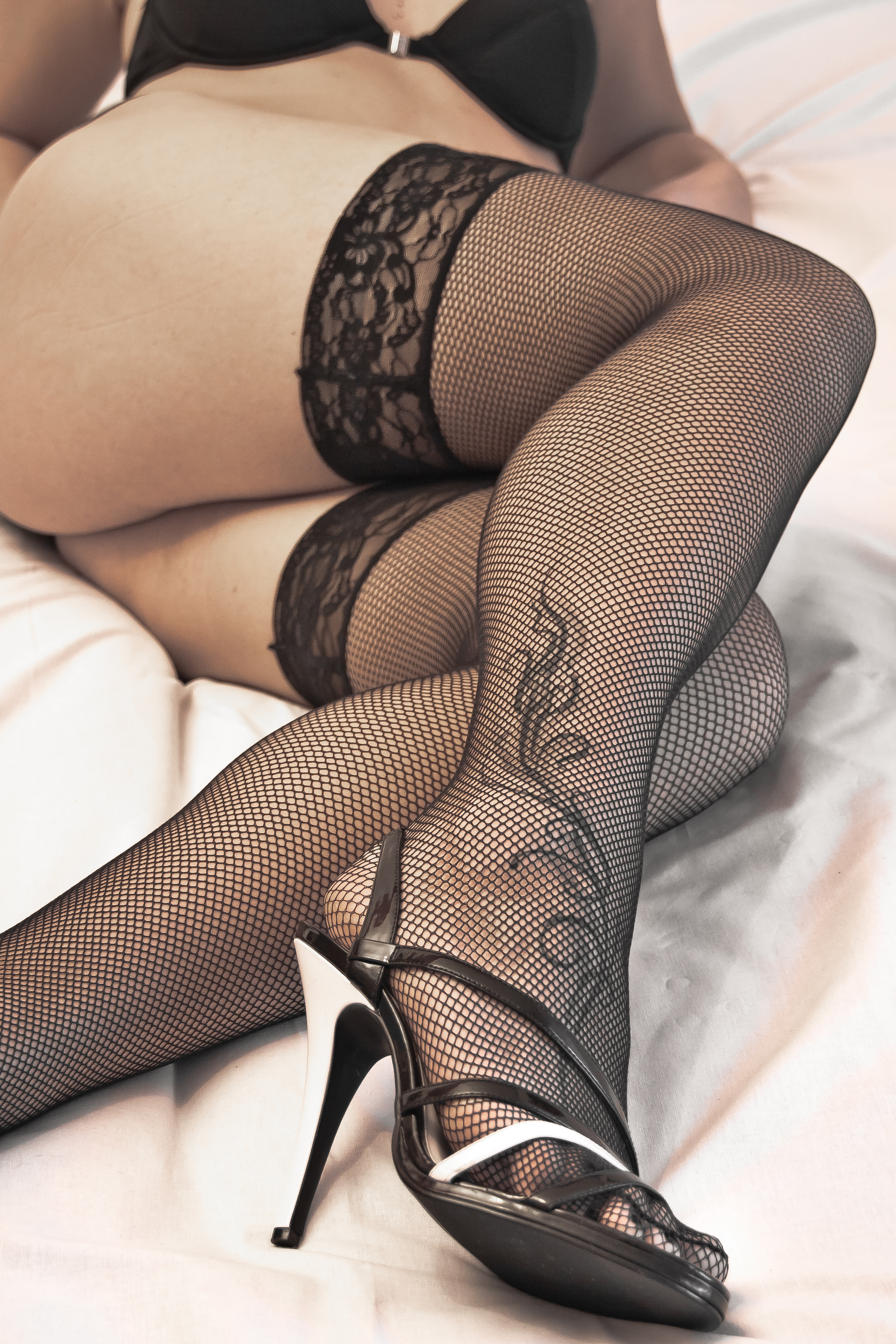
Woman wearing Hold-ups

Hold-ups or stay-ups (in the United States also referred to as thigh-high stockings or simply thigh highs) are a form of stockings with an elasticised band at the top. They are designed to hold themselves up on the thigh when worn, without the use of a suspender or garter belt.

Typically made of nylon or elastane, the top of the stocking is lined with a silicone or rubberised strip and may be covered by lace or decorative fabric. Some manufacturers refer to this style as garter stockings. First popularised in the mid-20th century, hold-ups are now widely used in fashion, performance, and entertainment contexts.

== Fashion ==
Hold-up stockings gained popularity in Europe and North America from the 1960s onwards, marketed as a modern alternative to traditional gartered stockings. Unlike tights or full-length pantyhose, hold-ups leave the groin area uncovered, which some wearers find more comfortable, especially in warm weather.

In fashion, hold-ups are often positioned as luxury items, commonly sold as part of lingerie sets or for formal wear under dresses. Lace-trimmed versions are popular for bridal, evening, or boudoir settings. Their dual role, both practical and decorative, has contributed to their continued commercial success.

Hold-ups have also seen periodic revivals in retro or vintage-inspired fashion, associated with 1950s and 1960s styling. In mainstream advertising and consumer culture, they may be used to signify elegance, femininity, or sophistication.

== Medical use and hygiene ==
While hold-ups are primarily marketed for fashion, they are occasionally favoured in clinical or post-operative contexts where less restrictive garments are required. Their open design may assist with air circulation, which some clinicians consider beneficial following gynaecological procedures.

In hospital settings, compression variants of hold-ups are used to prevent blood clots in patients with limited mobility, although these differ in design and function from fashion styles. Some wearers claim that hold-ups are more hygienic than tights due to improved ventilation, although peer-reviewed studies are limited.

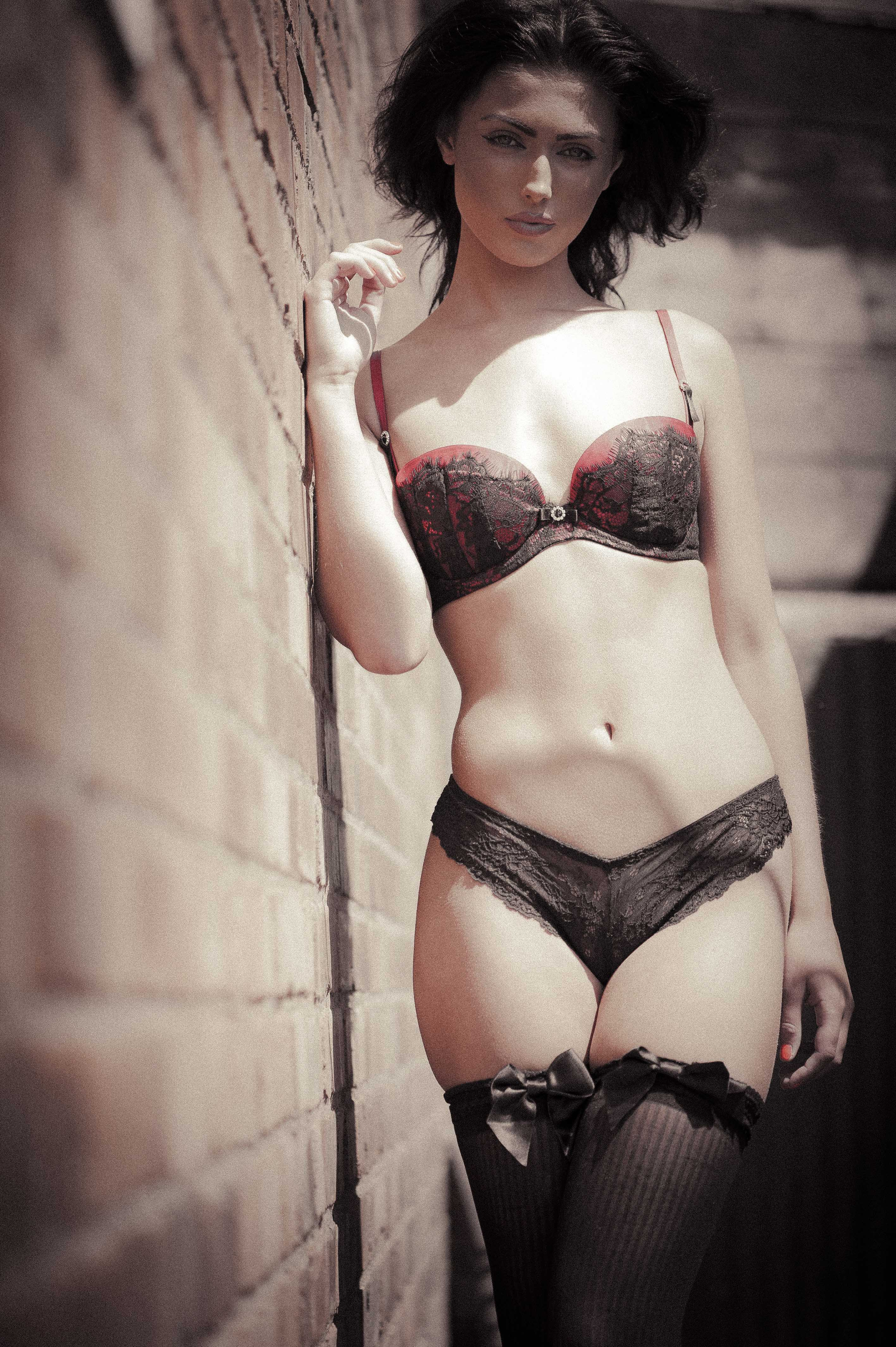
Matched lingerie with Hold-ups

== Erotica and media ==
Hold-ups have long held a place in erotica, glamour photography, and adult entertainment, used to accentuate the leg or suggest sexual availability with a combination of partial coverage and exposed skin.

In adult films, burlesque performances, and glamour photography, hold-ups are commonly worn as part of lingerie outfits. Their ability to be quickly removed or adjusted makes them popular in performative or staged contexts. The presence of hold-ups in visual media often reflects broader cultural narratives around femininity, glamour, and sexual agency. In some feminist and body-positive discourses, they are reinterpreted as symbols of confidence and control rather than mere sexual display.

While often considered fetish wear when styled provocatively, hold-ups also appear in more mainstream fashion shoots and film costumes, especially when referencing retro aesthetics or pin-up imagery.

== History ==
- In 1967, the British brand Pretty Polly marketed its hold-ups model.
- The following year, Le Bourget introduced its first Top model with an adjustable garter.
- In France, the market for self-supporting stockings expanded with the launch of Dim's Dim Up in 1986.

== See also ==
- Fully fashioned stockings
- Knee highs

=== Bibliography ===
- Jean Feixas, Le bas, Paris, Jean-Claude Gawsewitch Éditeur, October 2012, 240 pp. ISBN 978-2-35013-361-4.
