= Knee highs =

Type of hosiery

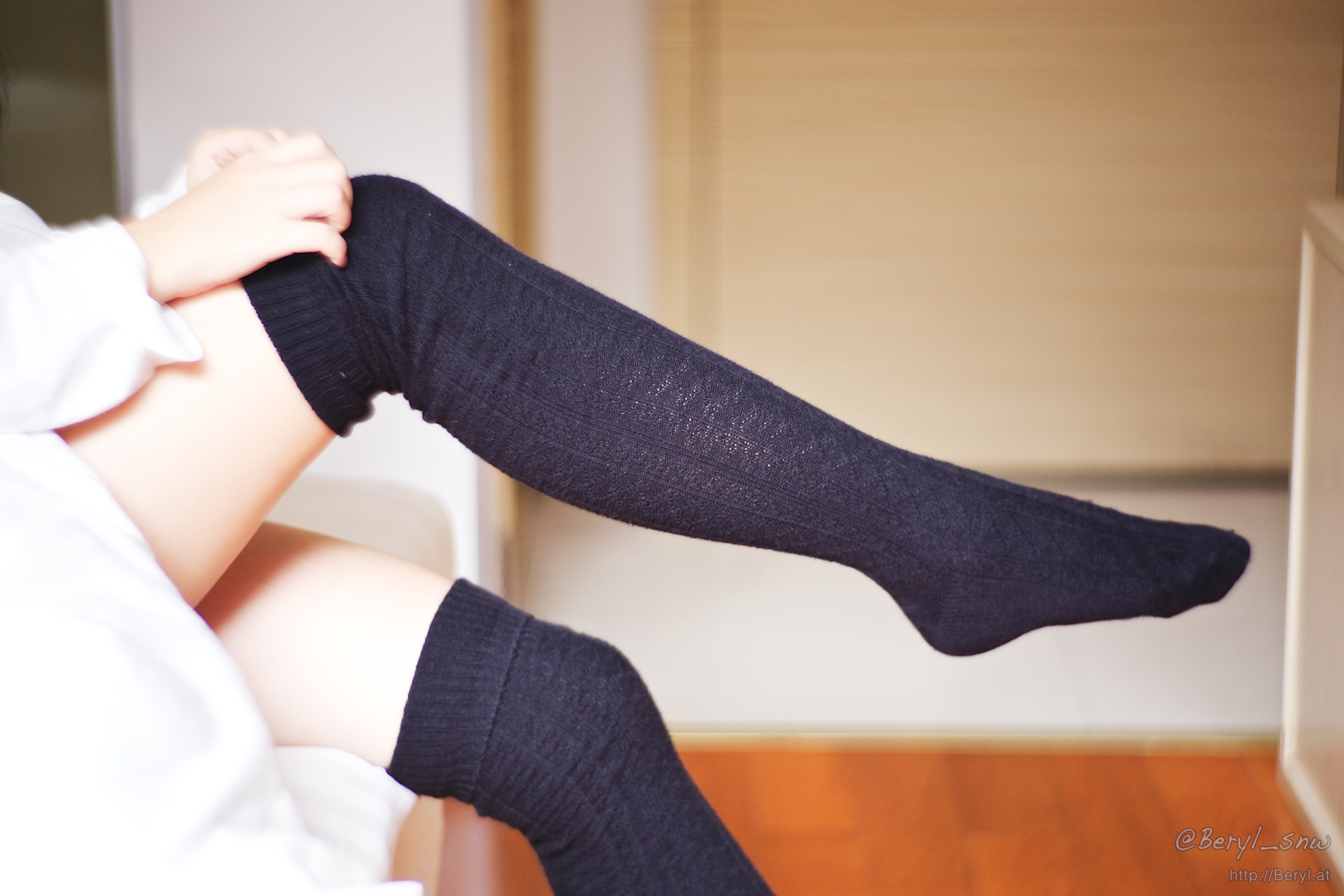
Knee highs

Knee highs are hosiery that cover the feet and legs up to the knee. A fashion accessory for casual and classic cool or warm weather apparel. Typically worn by women in many societies, they are sometimes worn with modern semi-formal attire. Unlike ordinary socks, they are generally made of nylon or other stocking materials. There were also different types and uses of knee highs for women.

Knee highs became popular during the 1960s and 1970s, worn in regular knee high length or top of the knee length so they could be folded over at the top, with the increase in popularity of the mini dress and miniskirt. This style continued throughout the 1980s with above the knee and at the knee length dresses. And in the '80s they were worn not only with boat shoes and flats but also with sneakers that could be worn both dressy or casual. They come in many colors and patterns and transparency levels. They are more popular in cold weather, because they keep the feet and lower legs warm. They are sometimes worn with dresses or skirts whose hemline is below the knee, and with trousers and leggings to keep the feet warm, and with boots to catch perspiration; and sometimes form part of girls' school uniforms.

== History ==
The Greeks, Egyptians, Romans, and Europeans wore articles of clothing similar to knee highs. It was during the Roman Empire that the first type of knee highs was introduced. At the time women wrapped their feet with cloth and bound leather straps around their feet up to the calves. It was done in order for warmth and protection. Later on, knee highs were bought and sold and became a fashion accessory. During the 1920s knee highs become popular in America. In the 1960s they became a fashionable accessory which lasted through the 1970s and 1980s and made a comeback in the mid to late 90s thanks to the movie Clueless. They are still seen as part of many school uniform requirements.

== Military ==
The British Army and the Navy required men to wear long woolen knee highs. They were to be worn for protection in the trenches, preventing foot rot. Many women sent long knitted socks to the troops during both World Wars.

== See also ==
- Hosiery
- Socks
- Stocking
- Hold-ups
