= Hosen (disambiguation) =

Hosen may refer to:

== Places ==
- Hosen, place in Northern, Israel
- Hosen, Iran, village in Kerman, Iran

== Surname ==
- Amgad Hosen (born 1975), Egyptian athlete
- Roger Hosen (1933–2005), English rugby union player and cricketer

== Other uses ==
- Die Toten Hosen, German punk rock band
- Hosen Gakuen College, Japanese private junior college
- Hōsen-in, Buddhist temple in Kyoto, Japan
