= Sheer fabric =

Any lightweight, translucent fabric

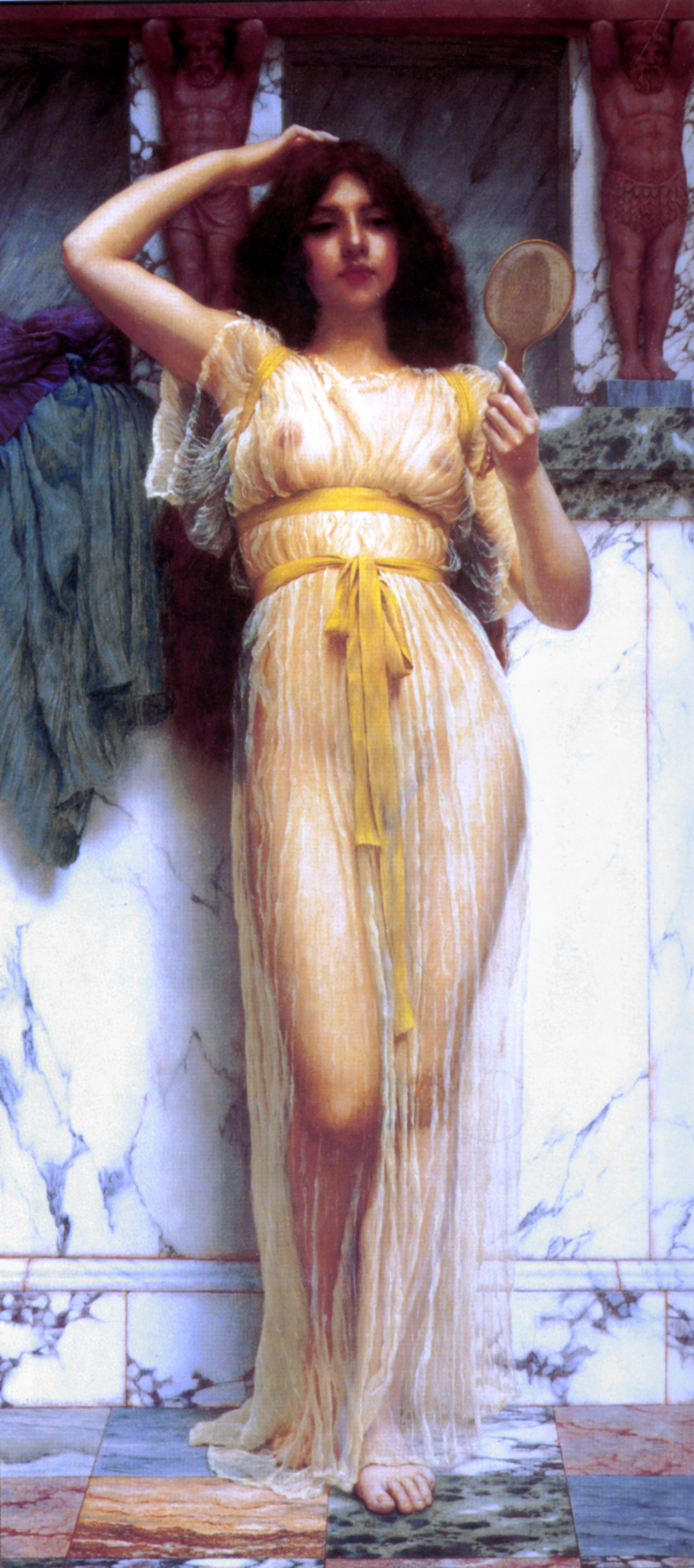
The Mirror (1899) by John William Godward

Sheer fabric is fabric made using thin thread or low density of knit. This results in a translucent and flimsy cloth. Some sheer fabrics become transparent when wet.

== Overview ==
The sheerness of a fabric is expressed as a numerical denier which ranges from 3 (extremely rare, very thin, barely visible) to 15 (standard sheer for stockings) up to 30 (semi opaque) until 100 (opaque). The materials which can be made translucent include gossamer, silk, rayon or nylon. Sheer fabric comes in a wide variety of colors, but for curtains, white and shades of white, such as cream, winter white, eggshell, and ivory are popular. In some cases, sheer fabric is embellished with embroidered patterns or designs.

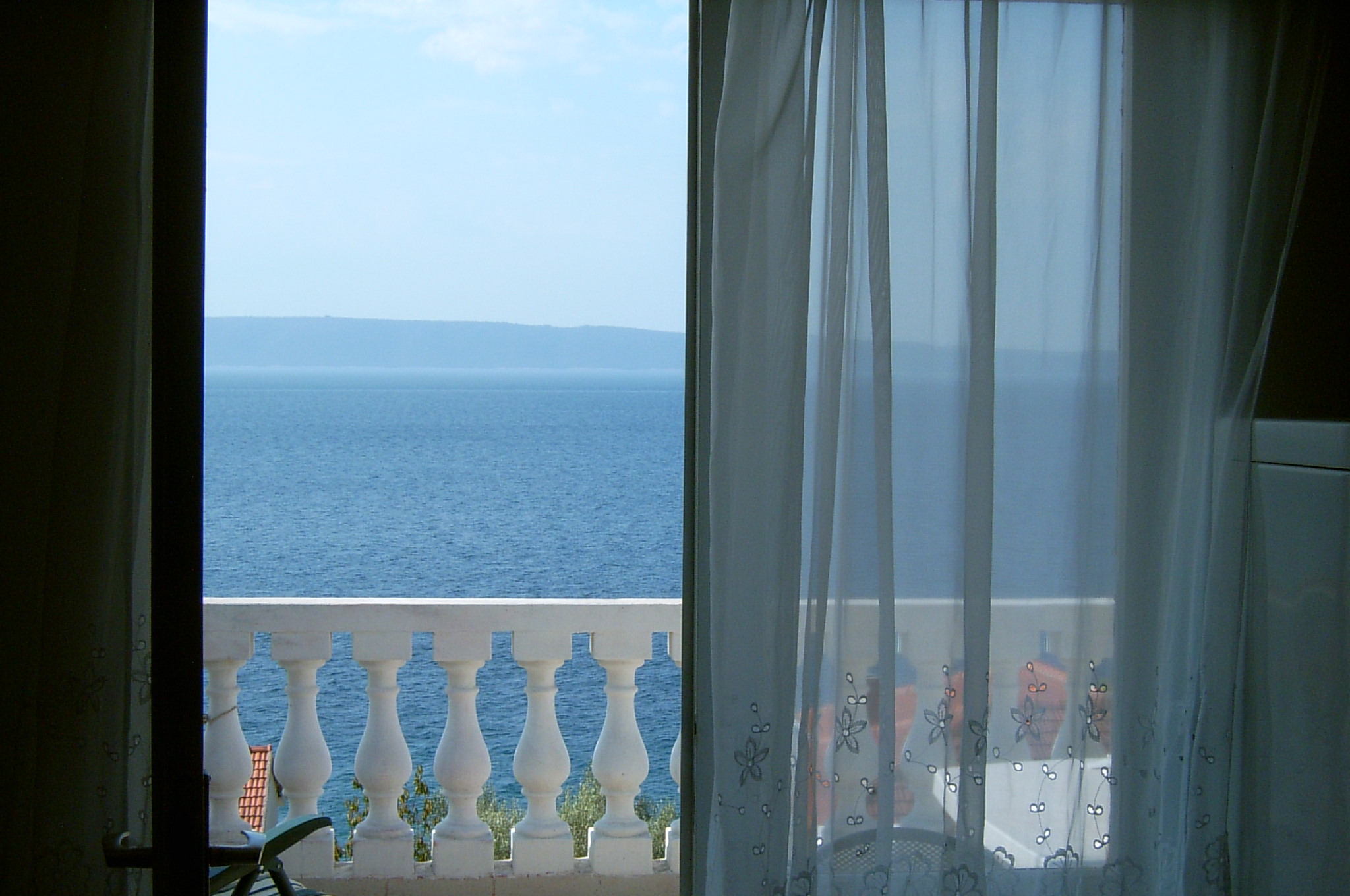
Sheer curtains

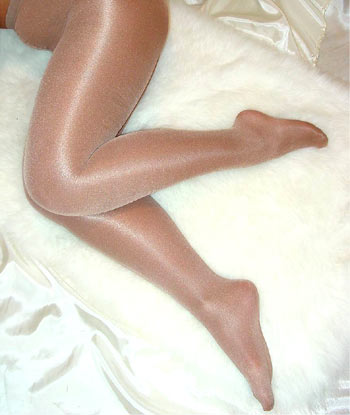
Sheer pantyhose made from nylon

A common use for sheer fabric is in curtains, which allows for sunlight to pass through during daylight, while maintaining a level of privacy. However, when it is lighter on the inside of a room than it is on the outside (such as at nighttime), then the inside of the room can be seen from the outside. Due to the loose weave in sheer fabrics, such curtains offer little heat insulation.

Sheer fabric is used in clothing, in garments such as stockings or tights and in dancewear and lingerie, and sometimes as part of clothing, such as in wedding gowns and formal costumes. Sheer fabric for clothing offers very little in the way of warmth for the wearer, and for this reason is commonly worn in hot weather. It offers relatively low sun protection.

Though sheer stockings have been popular since the 1920s, and have been used in women's nightwear for some time, the use of sheer fabrics in other clothing has become more common in recent years. There has been a sheer fashion trend in fashion circles since 2008, with sheer fabrics being used in tight clothes, layers, and in delicate feminine draping.

== See also ==
- Bodystocking
- Georgette (fabric)
- See-through clothing
- Silk
- Ultra sheer
