= Pantyhose =

Sheer waist-high nylon legwear usually worn by women

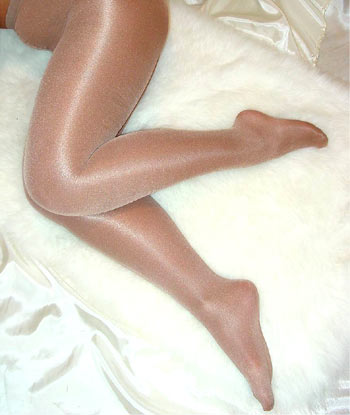
High-gloss, sheer-to-waist pantyhose

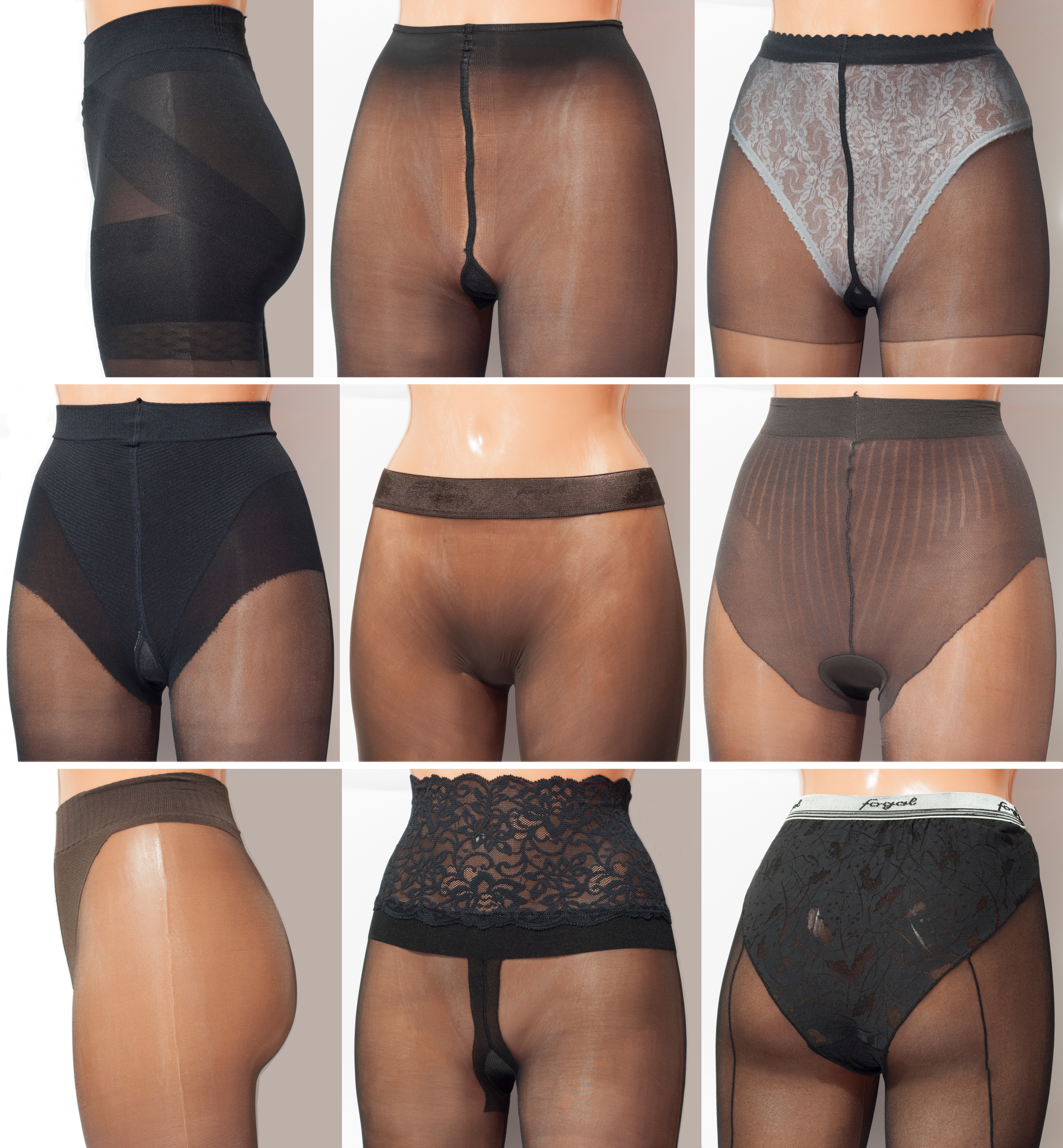
Pantyhose brief styles (top to bottom, left to right): control-top, sheer-to-waist and simple-panty sections

Pantyhose, sometimes also called sheer tights, are close-fitting legwear covering the wearer's body from the waist to the toes. Pantyhose first appeared on store shelves in 1959 for the advertisement of new design panties (Allen Gant's product, 'Panti-Legs') as a convenient alternative to stockings and/or control panties which, in turn, replaced girdles.

Like stockings or knee highs, pantyhose are usually made of nylon, or of other fibers blended with nylon. Pantyhose are designed to:

- Be attractive in appearance,
- Hide physical features such as blemishes, bruises, scars, leg hair, spider veins, or varicose veins,
- Give those with very pale skin a tan-like appearance,
- Reduce visible panty lines, and
- Ease chafing between feet and footwear or between thighs.

Besides being worn as fashion, in Western society pantyhose are sometimes worn by women as part of formal dress. Also, the dress code of some companies and schools may require pantyhose or fashion tights to be worn when skirts or shorts are worn as part of a uniform.

== Terminology ==
The term "pantyhose" originated in the United States and is a combination of panties (an American English term) with sheer nylon hosiery. In British English, these garments are called "sheer tights". The term tights alone refers to all such garments regardless of whether they are sheer lingerie or sturdy outerwear.

In American English, the term "tights" typically refers to pantyhose-like garments made from thicker material, which are generally opaque or slightly translucent. Opaque leg wear made of material such as spandex are often worn by both sexes for athletic activities or as utility clothing, and are usually referred to as "leggings", a term that includes casual wear.

The primary difference between tights and leggings is that leggings can be worn as outerwear, whereas tights are not. In most cases, leggings will have a seam on the inside of the leg, whereas the legs of tights will be seamless. Leggings will often be footless, whereas tights usually will not.

== History ==
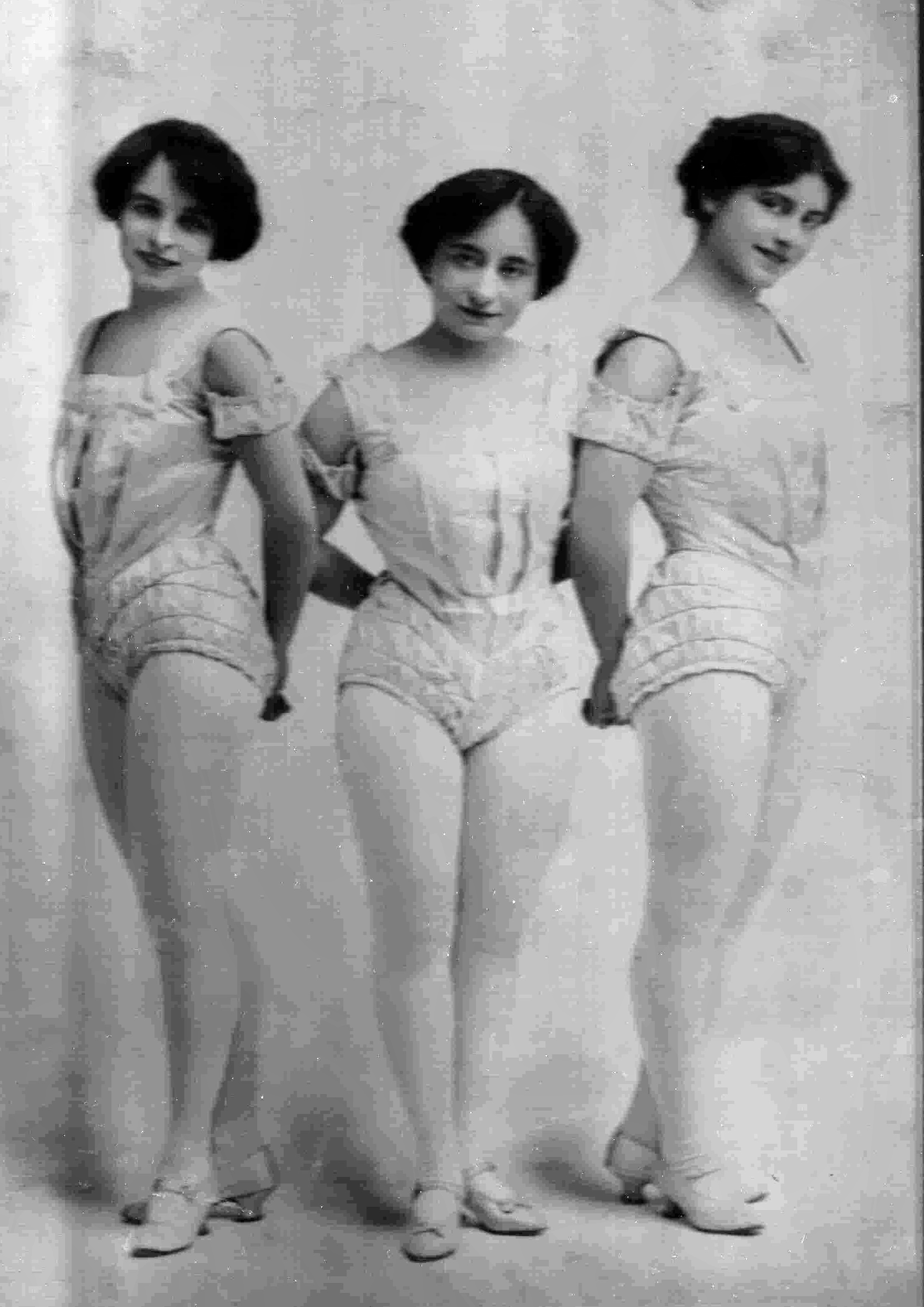
The Macarte Sisters wearing tights under their leotard-based costumes in 1910

The history of pantyhose, as for stockings, is tied to that of changes in styles of women's hemlines. Before the 1920s, it was generally expected that women would cover their legs in public, including their ankles; dress and skirt hemlines were generally to the ground. The main exceptions were in sports and entertainment, making tights a more suitable choice.

In cases of high-cut legs or fabrics that would produce a visible panty line, it was a practical necessity to wear them as the only lower undergarment. In the 1920s, fashionable hemlines for women began to rise, exposing the legs to just below the knees. Stockings also came into vogue to maintain leg coverage, as well as some level of warmth.

The most popular stockings were sheer hosiery which were first made of silk or rayon (then known as "artificial silk"), and, after 1940, made of nylon, which had been invented by DuPont in 1938. During the 1940s and 1950s, stage and film producers would sew stockings to the briefs of their actresses and dancers, as testified to by singer-actress-dancer Ann Miller. These garments were seen in popular motion pictures such as Daddy Long Legs.

In 1953, Allen Gant Sr. of Glen Raven Knitting Mills developed a commercial equivalent to these hose that he named "Panti-Legs", but these were not brought to the open market until about 1959. During this time, Ernest G. Rice invented his own design for pantyhose similar to those worn today, and in 1956 he submitted a patent titled "Combination Stockings and Panty". This design was adopted by other makers, and this caused disputes in U.S. courts for many years before the patent was upheld some time after Rice's own death.

Meanwhile, the yarn manufacturer Chemstrand already presented a product with an opaque panty part and gusset called leotard-stockings in November 1958. In 1974, actress Julie Newmar successfully filed a patent for "Pantyhose with shaping band for cheeky derriere relief", a garment innovation made famous through the costume she designed in the 1960s for her role as Catwoman in the TV show Batman.

Up until this time, there was little reason for women outside show business to wear "panty hose", as the longer hemlines allowed for the use of over-the-knee stockings secured with a garter belt. Nonetheless, during the 1960s, improved textile manufacturing processes made pantyhose increasingly more affordable, while human-made textiles such as spandex (or elastane) made them more comfortable and durable.

The advent of the fashionable miniskirt, which exposed the legs to well above the knee, made pantyhose a necessity to many women. In 1970, U.S. sales of pantyhose exceeded stockings for the first time, and it has remained so ever since. Pantyhose became a wardrobe staple throughout the 1970s and 1980s.

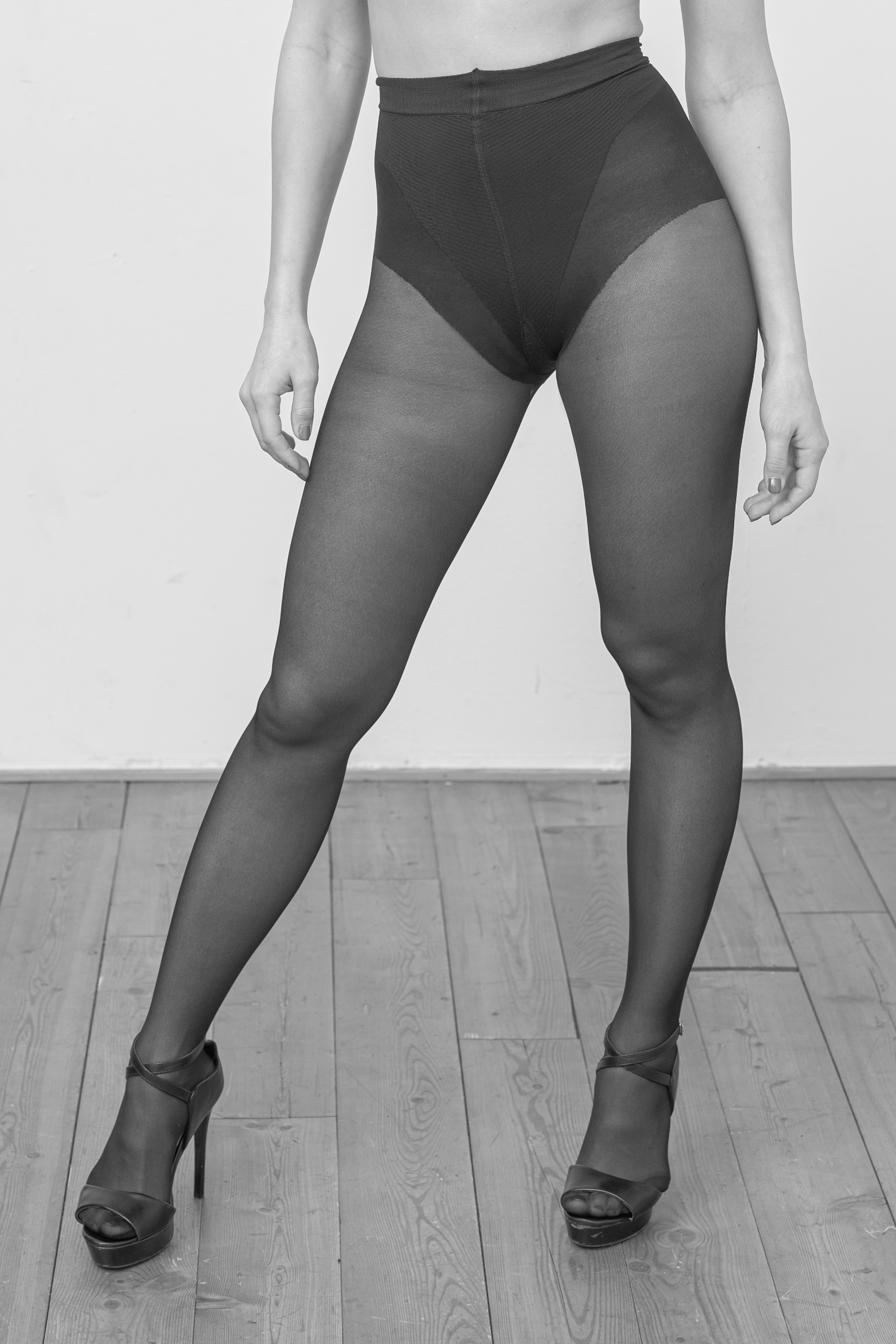
Sheer tights with a control-top

From 1995 a steady decline began, leveling off in 2006 with U.S. sales less than half of what they had once been. This decline has been attributed to bare legs in fashion, changes in workplace dress code, and the increased popularity of trousers.

While sales of traditional styles did not recover, the 2000s saw the rise of other specific styles. Fishnet hose, patterns and colors, opaque tights, low-rise pantyhose, footless shapewear, and pantyhose for men (playfully referred to as "mantyhose") all experienced increased sales.

In the 2010s, an increasing popularity for form-fitting opaque leggings paired with casual dress (and even some officewear) supplanted the fashion role previously held by pantyhose, although pantyhose remain popular as part of formalwear.

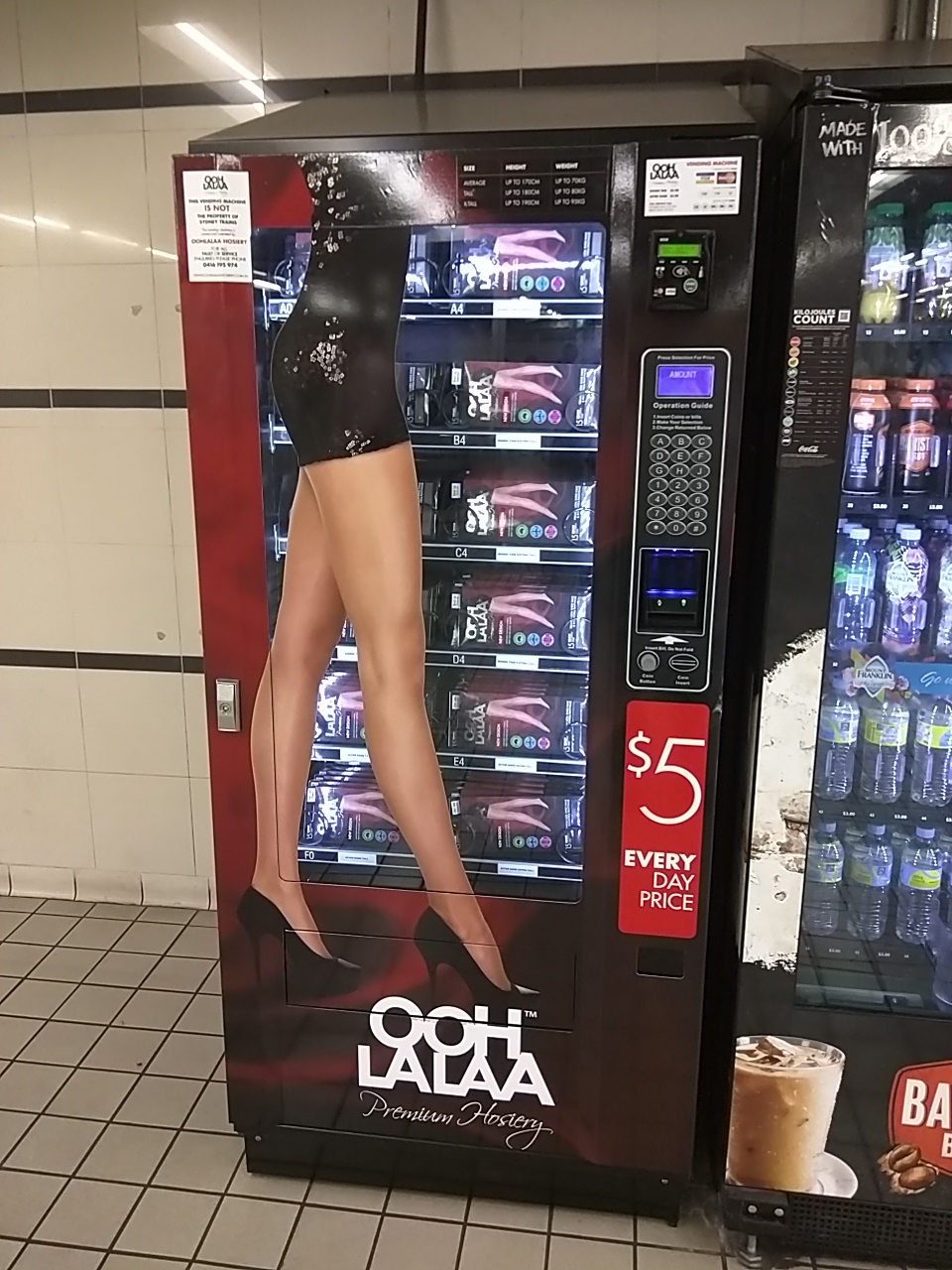
Pantyhose vending machine at Town Hall railway station, Sydney, Australia

== Composition ==
Pantyhose generally have a standard construction: the top of the waist is a strong elastic; the part covering the hips and the buttocks (the panty area) is composed of a thicker material than for the legs.

The gusset or crotch covering the genitalia is a stronger material, sometimes made of porous cotton, but the legs of the pantyhose are made of the thinnest usable fabrics, and it has a consistent construction down to the wearer's toes. These can be reinforced to guard against wear and tear.

Most pantyhose are composed of nylon and a mixture of spandex, which provides the elasticity and form-fitting that is characteristic of modern pantyhose. The nylon fabric is somewhat prone to tearing ("running"), and it is common for very sheer hose to "run" soon after snagging on anything that is rough or sharp.

Variations in pantyhose construction exist, such as with fishnet pantyhose. Pantyhose may be composed of other materials such as silk, cotton, cashmere or wool.

== Styles ==
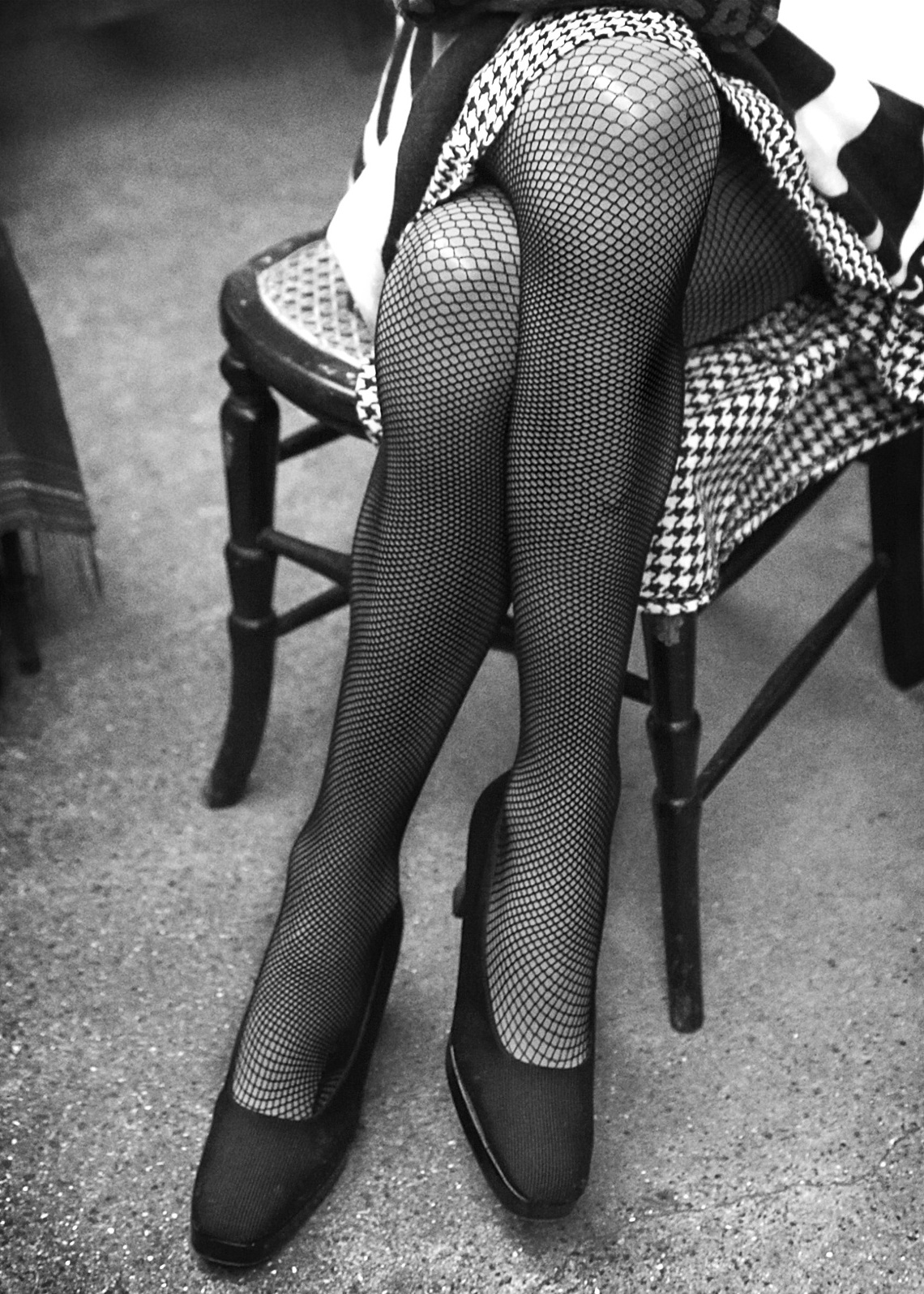
Fishnet pantyhose

Pantyhose are available in a wide range of styles. The sheerness of the garment, expressed as a numerical "denier"/'dtex", ranges from 3 (extremely rare, very thin, barely visible) up to 20 (standard sheer), 30 (semi opaque) up to 250 (opaque). The term denier is often referred to the weight of the yarn that was used to produce the item of hosiery. A higher denier of yarn results in a thicker pair of tights.

Control-top pantyhose, intended to boost a slimmer figure, has a reinforced-panty section. The panty section may be visible when wearing short skirts or shorts.

Sheer-to-waist pantyhose is sheer throughout, with the panty portion being the same thickness and color as the leg portion, and are designed for use with high-slit gowns, miniskirts, hot pants, or lingerie. Often sheer-to-waist pantyhose will be reinforced along and on either side of the seam in the middle of the panty. Often sheer-to-waist pantyhose comes with sandal toes - invisibly reinforced toes part.

Open toe pantyhose starts from the waist and ends just before the toes, leaving toes free, which allows legs to be covered with the tights, but toes to be shown in sandals or peep toe shoes.

Open-crotch pantyhose, sometimes known as crotchless pantyhose, do not have a gusset. Instead, an opening is in place for hygiene or sexual-fetishism activities.

Some pantyhose have single- or double-panel gussets incorporated into them. In single-panel, there are two seams instead of the usual one, with a single seam on the opposite side; with double-panel gussets, there are two seams on either side.

== Concerns ==
The disadvantages of pantyhose includes:

- Unlike cotton, nylon is not an absorbent material. As a result, perspiration is more likely to remain in contact with the feet, legs and genital area, thereby encouraging bacterial growth and bad odor. Some hosiery products contain silver to help prevent odor and sweating of the feet, thus making the wearing of hosiery a more pleasant experience. Wearing natural fiber silk stockings and tights is another means of reducing perspiration.
- Some women do not wear pantyhose for environmental reasons, noting that they usually cannot be recycled, and nylon pantyhose are not biodegradable. Disposing of the item contributes to overuse of landfill. Burning nylon pantyhose sometimes releases toxins into the atmosphere.

In the UK, local authorities accept clean, dry textiles along with other recyclables. This is both at recycling centres and curb-side collections. Textiles (including tights, pantyhose and stockings) which cannot be re-worn are recycled and turned into things like roofing felt. There are several internet sites which explain ways of reusing pantyhose (laddered or otherwise).

In the US, nylon stockings, tights, and pantyhose can be sent to Recycled Crafts to be used in craft projects like pet toys, rugs, placemats, and table runners. Swedish Stockings, maker of hosiery, has a program to grind down old pantyhose for use in oil and grease traps. In the past, hosiery manufacturer No Nonsense had a recycling program, and so did Matter of Trust.

- Pantyhose have been criticized for being flimsy because the thin knit fabric is prone to tearing or laddering (or "running"). The wearer can cause a run in the hose by catching a toenail in the fabric when the hose is put on, by catching it on a rough surface like a corner of a desk, or a car, and by numerous other risks. Some women apply clear nail polish or hair spray to their hose to prevent runs from growing. Some brands offer "ladder-resist" pantyhose which are more durable than regular ones.

== Use by men ==
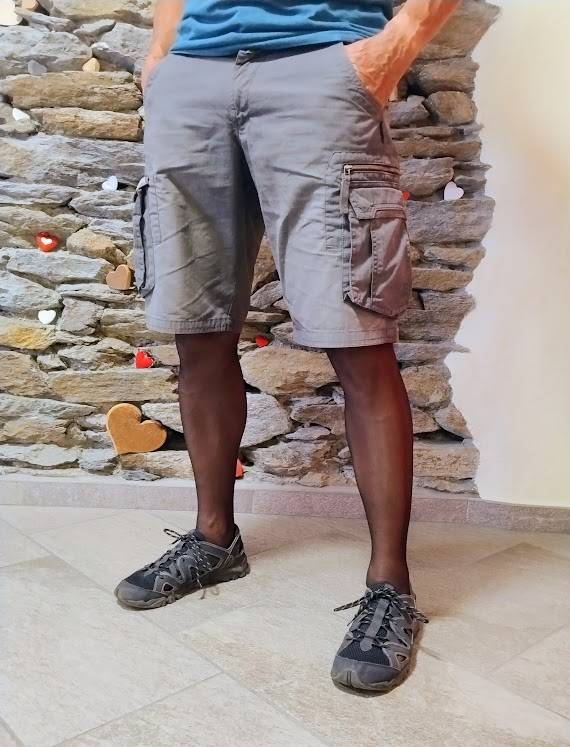
Typical mantyhose worn by a man

While usually considered to be a woman's garment, pantyhose can also be worn by men, for example for thermal protection, therapeutic relief or simply as a fashion choice. For centuries, men wore hosiery of various kinds from pantyhose, stocks (stockings), chausses to the modern knee high athletic socks.

Race horse jockeys may wear pantyhose under their uniform to enable them to glide freely over the legs and waist when the jockey's body moves at a rapid pace.

Some fishermen who surf fish from tropical beaches may wear pantyhose for protection from jellyfish whose stingers are triggered by contact with a chemical on bare skin. In the late 1990s, several manufacturers introduced pantyhose styles designed for men to cater to this niche market.

== Gallery ==
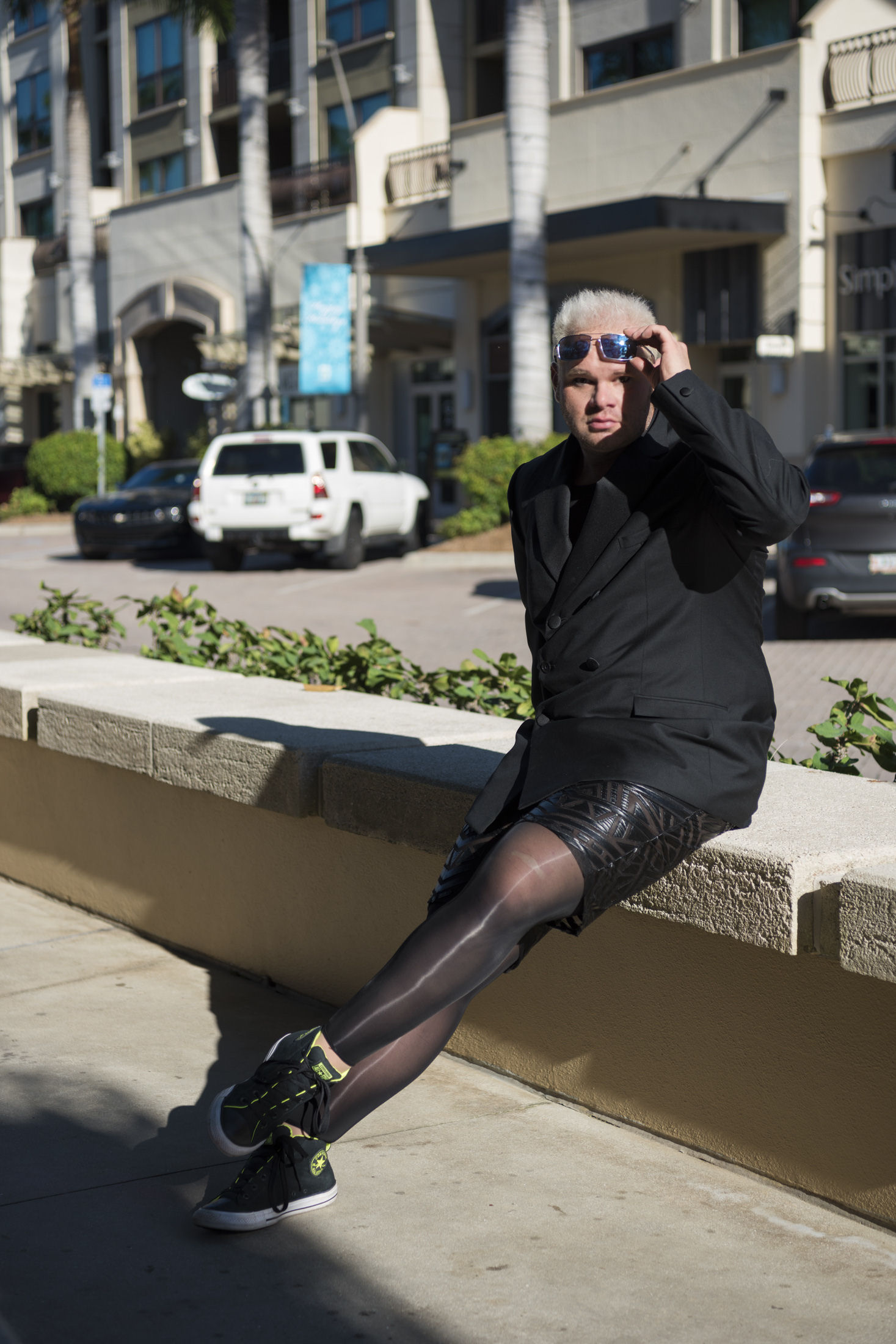
A man wearing mantyhose (pantyhose designed specifically for men)

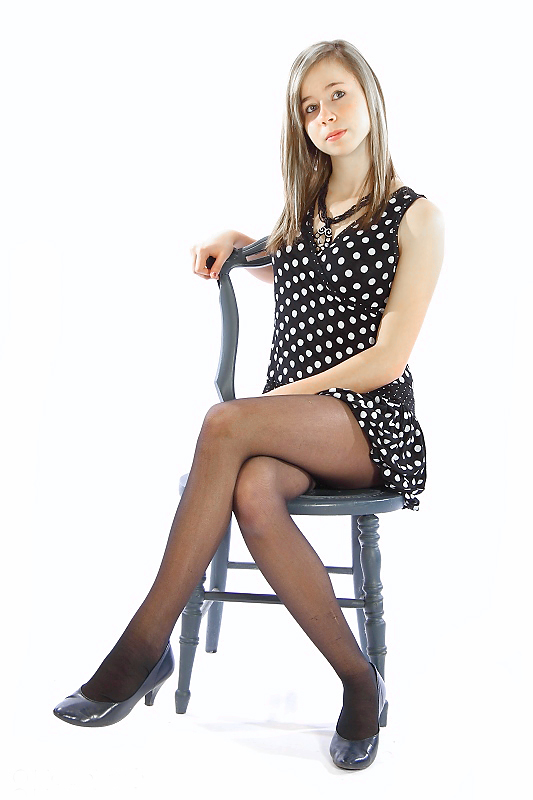
Woman wearing pantyhose and a polkadot dress

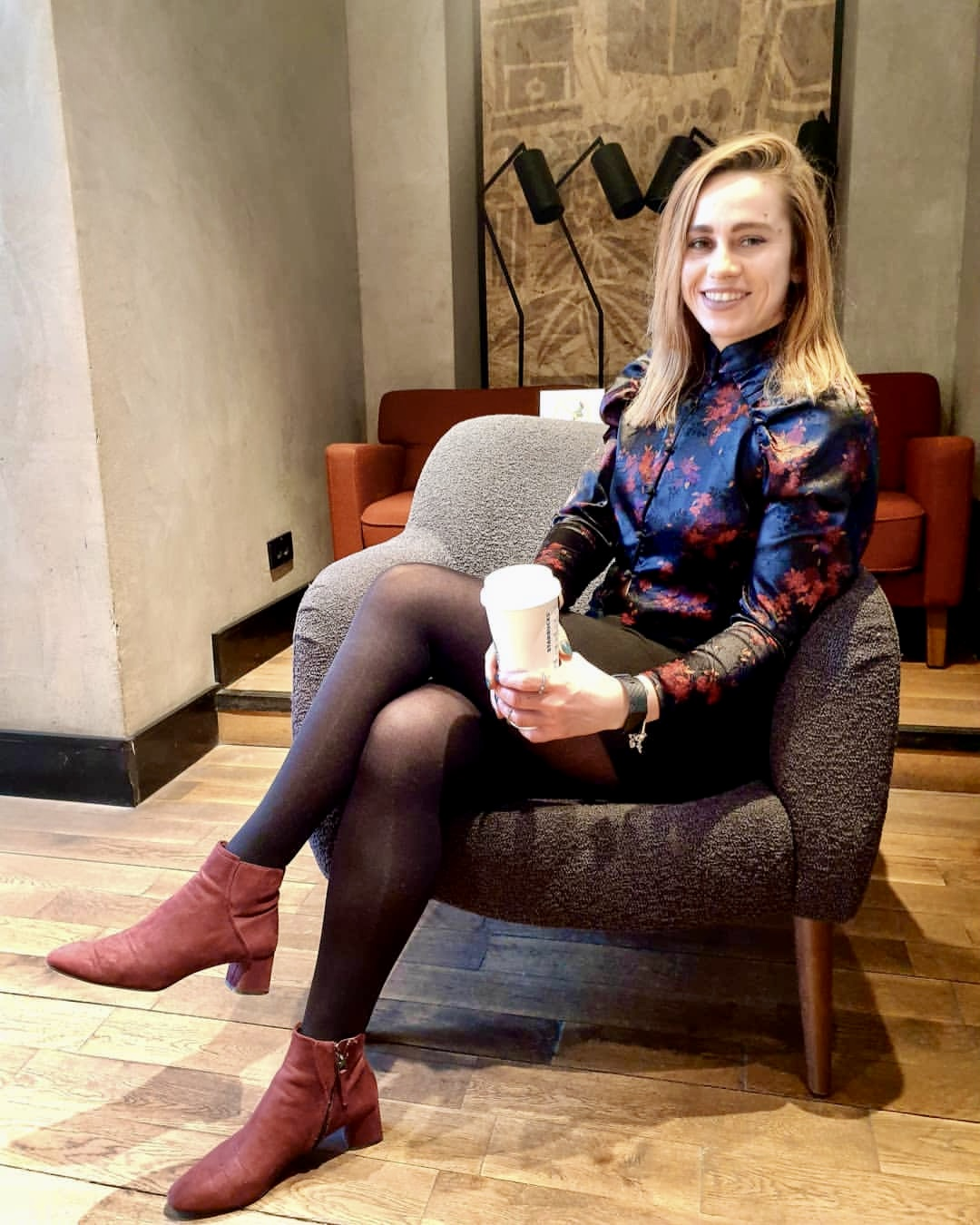
Woman wearing a mini-skirt and pantyhose

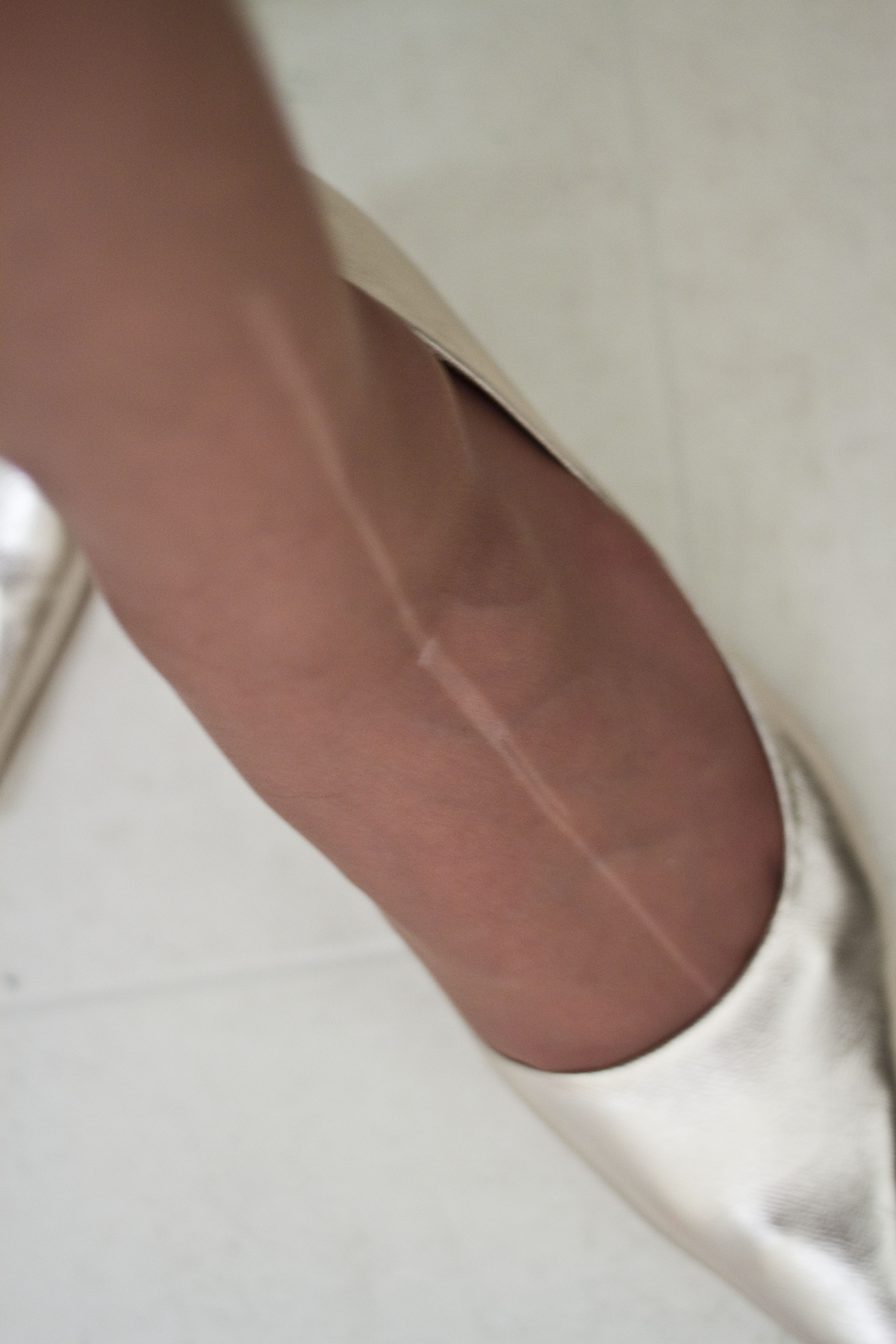
Example of a "run" or "ladder"

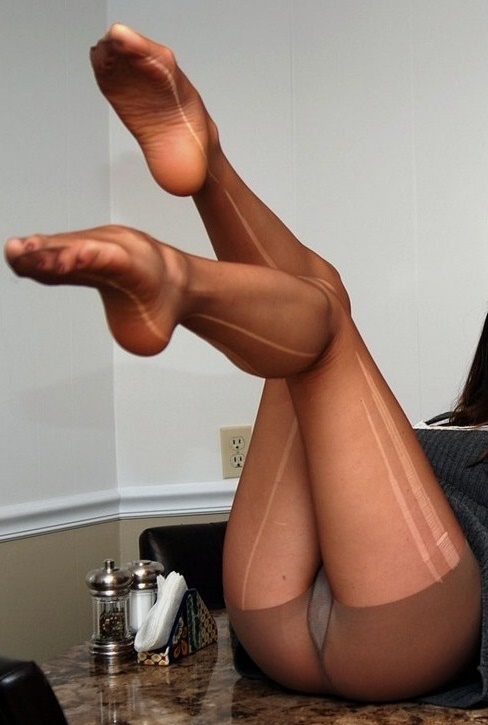
Image of a woman with her legs and pantyhose posing erotically, an example of tights fetishism.

== See also ==
- Tights
- Long underwear
