= Mizuage =

Ceremony undergone by apprentice courtesans and some apprentice geisha (pre-1956)

Mizuage (水揚げ, lit. 'hoisting from water') was a ceremony undergone by apprentice oiran (kamuro) and some maiko (apprentice geisha) as part of their coming of age ceremony and graduation.

For kamuro, who had often already lost their virginity, a patron would pay for the exclusive privilege of being a new oiran's first customer; for maiko who underwent mizuage, it formed part of a number of ceremonies and occasions used to mark graduation into geishahood, including symbolic changes in hairstyle and official visits to benefactors. Before the outlawing of prostitution in Japan, maiko who underwent mizuage would see patrons and benefactors bid large sums of money for the privilege of taking their virginity, a sum of money the okiya (the geisha house an apprentice was affiliated to) would take entirely.

In the present day, a maiko's graduation is known as erikae (襟替え, 'turning the collar [of a kimono]'), and is entirely non-sexual, though some older sources – such as the autobiography of Mineko Iwasaki, the geisha that inspired the character Sayuri in the novel Memoirs of a Geisha by author Arthur Golden refer to the non-sexual graduation of maiko to geishahood as mizuage. Kamuro, and courtesans as an extension, exist in a wholly non-sexual capacity in modern-day Japan; oiran re-enactment parades are performed by actors, and tayū perform their profession's traditional arts without the inclusion of sex work. In both capacities, the kamuro of both oiran (who are merely actors in a parade) and tayū (for whom the role is a profession) do not engage in sex work as part of a 'graduation' out of apprenticeship.

== History ==
Mizuage has been long connected with the loss of virginity of a maiko, because some maiko did undergo ceremonies to lose their virginity. Mizuage for a maiko would also include monetary sponsorship by the mizuage patron, intended to support and promote the maiko's debut to geisha status. Through this sponsorship of the apprentice, a patron would essentially purchase the right to take the maiko's virginity. The mizuage patron would often have no further relations with the young woman in question.

In the modern day, mizuage is a contentious issue, both within the geisha communities of Japan and elsewhere. The practice was outlawed following the introduction of the Anti-Prostitution Law in 1956, categorised under the "traffic in human flesh". Many geisha who came of age before the passing of the law went through the experience of mizuage, and though most geisha had no choice in the patron who took their virginity, with some instances of geisha being sold more than once, according to the research of anthropologist Liza Dalby, though this process was generally not pleasant, for many, it was perceived as a natural stage in growing up, with trainees in the same age cohort who had not graduated viewed by their peers as having been somewhat left behind.

== Post-1956 ==
Mineko Iwasaki, former high-ranking Gion geisha, detailed her experience of mizuage in her autobiography, Geisha, a Life. Describing her experience of graduation to geishahood with the term mizuage, Iwasaki described her experience as a round of formal visits to announce her graduation, including the presentation of gifts to related geisha houses and important patrons, and a cycle through five different hairstyles before graduating. This set of graduation experiences is generally referred to as erikae in the modern day.

Dalby relays the change between pre- and post-1956 attitudes to mizuage within the geisha community through her first-hand accounts with the geisha mothers of Ponto-chō:

"What about mizu-age now?" I asked, seeing this as a chance to find out more about sex in the geisha world [...] "It's all changed now," said the okāsan. "There's no mizu-age ceremony any more [...] All the maiko have been through junior high school, so they aren't as ignorant as we were – right, Ichiume? They pretty much pick their own boyfriends and patrons when they're ready. That's not the same as mizu-age."

All modern maiko and geisha have full control over their personal choices regarding sex, and most maiko begin training, attending banquets, and interacting with customers aged 18 – though they may start living at the okiya as a shikomi (maids) for a few years before graduation to minarai (lit. 'learning by observation') and then maiko status.

Though customers attending geisha parties and banquets generally expect some level of convivial and low-key flirtation, a maiko is likely to be considered off-limits as a younger and more vulnerable participant to such gatherings. Maiko are instead treated with generosity by guests cognisant of their relative inexperience at geisha parties.

== In literature ==
Arthur Golden's novel Memoirs of a Geisha portrays mizuage as a financial arrangement in which a girl's virginity is sold to a "mizuage patron", generally someone who particularly enjoys sex with virgin girls, or merely enjoys the charms of an individual maiko.

Former geisha Sayo Masuda describes mizuage in her 1957 autobiography Autobiography of a Geisha as sexual exploitation. Masuda describes being sold multiple times by her okiya to men, ostensibly for the purposes of taking her virginity, under the pretence that she had not yet lost it. The transaction was explicitly a sexual arrangement, far removed from the ceremony of graduating into geishahood, netting the okiya a large profit. Despite her personal experiences, Masuda argued against the outlawing of sex work in Japan, explaining that it provided a way for women to make an independent living when chosen as a profession, and through criminalisation, would merely be driven underground.

== See also ==
- Virginity auction
