= Shinto wedding =

Religious wedding ceremony in Japan

Shinto weddings, Shinzen kekkon, Shinzenkekkon (神前結婚, "Marriage before the kami"), began in Japan during the early 20th century, popularized after the marriage of Crown Prince Yoshihito and his bride, Princess Kujo Sadako. The ceremony relies heavily on Shinto themes of purification, and involves ceremonial sake drinking of three cups three times, the nan-nan-san-ku-do. Shinto weddings are in decline as fewer Japanese people get married, with those who do often choosing Western-style, white wedding ceremonies.

== The ceremony ==
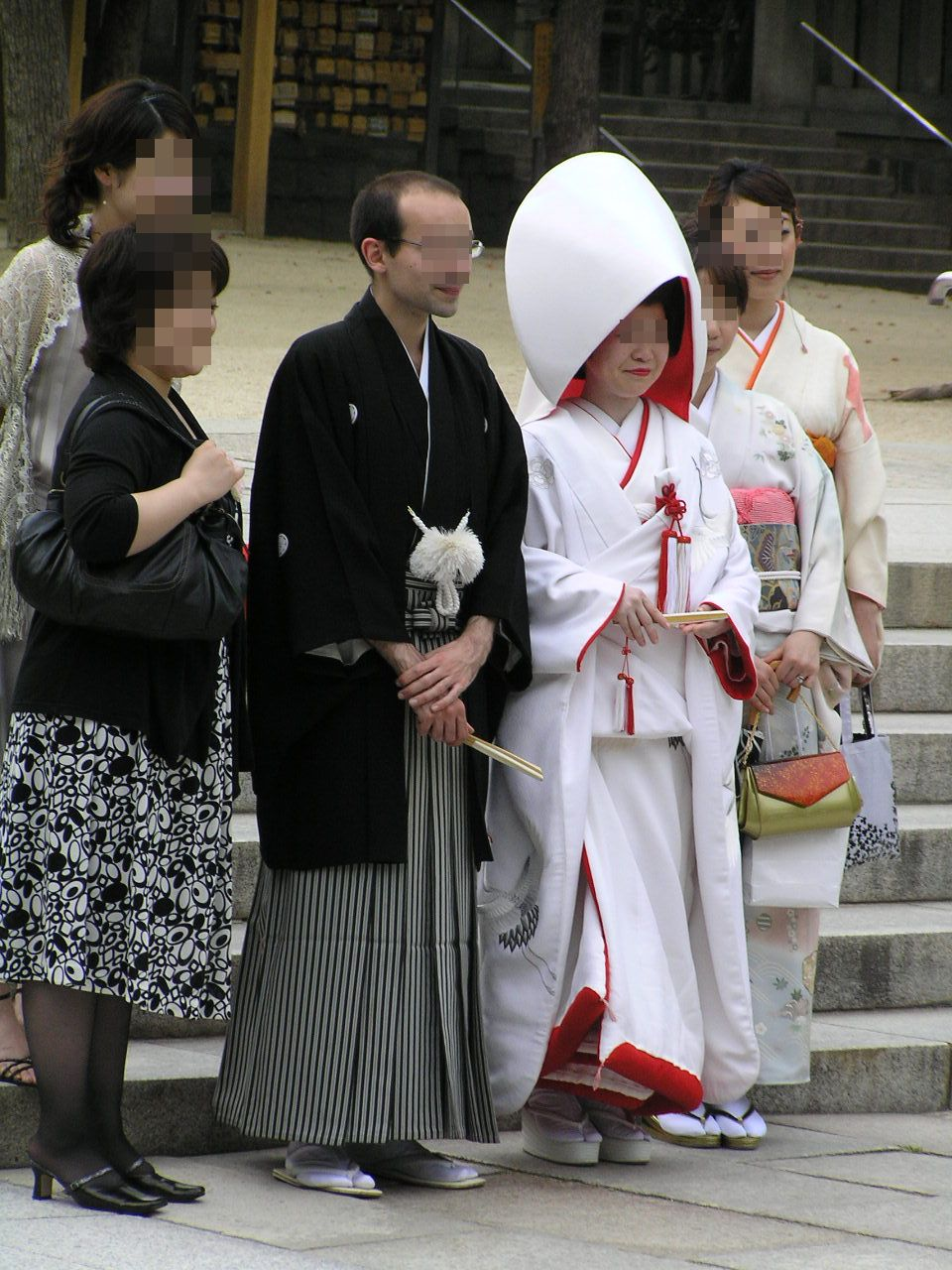
A Shinto wedding ceremony.

A Shinto wedding ceremony is typically a small affair, limited to family, while a reception is open to a larger group of friends.

Shinzen kekkon, literally "wedding before the kami," is a Shinto purification ritual that incorporates the exchange of sake between the couple before they are married. The ceremony typically takes 20 to 30 minutes. Food items, including salt, water, rice, sake, fruit, and vegetables, are left at a ceremonial wedding altar, which also holds the wedding rings. A Shinto priest stands to the right of the altar, while a shrine maiden, Miko, stands to the left. The couple will often stand in the center of the room, while closest family members stand behind tables containing sake and small fruits.

The priest will purify the shrine and call the attention of benevolent spirits, or kami. Then, the priest announces the beginning of the san-san-ku-do ceremony, or "three-three-nine-times," reflecting three oaths taken three times, represented by three cups, poured three times, and swallowed in three sips. This often includes three pourings from three cups of increasing sizes. The first, smallest cup, is first poured to the groom, who drinks from it before offering it to the bride. The second pouring goes first to the bride, then to the groom. The final pouring goes from the groom first, then the bride (essentially repeating the first pour). The sake aspect of the ceremony is said to be the core of a Shinto wedding. The ritual may have originated at samurai weddings, though the symbolism of the action and numbers has no clear origin. Some see the ritual as representative of sharing joys and sorrows as a married couple, others suggest that san-san is a homonym for "birth after birth," suggesting fertility symbolism. Still others suggest it represents man, woman, and child, or heaven, earth and man.

A video depicting a full shinto wedding

The couple approaches the altar, where the groom reads his vows while the bride listens. Reflecting a history of arranged marriage in Japan, a nakodo, or "matchmaker," will be thanked in the vows. If no matchmaker exists, a friend or family member will be appointed to fill the role, serving a role similar to the "best man" or "bridesmaid." Then, the families join in with the drinking of sake and a traditional cheer of "kanpai (乾杯)". In the final portion of the ceremony, the priest offers Japanese evergreen to the altar, said to reflect gratitude to the spirits who blessed the union. The bride and groom follow with their own offering, then a representative from each family (often the fathers of the bride and groom). The rings are then presented.

Within wedding prayers, the gods Izanagi and Izanami are often invoked. These married gods were part of the Japanese lore of the "first wedding," and are called upon to reflect a harmonious balance within the marriage. Other aspects of the Shinto wedding prayer include calling for the couple to work to maintain a respectful home, and for the couple to have children.

=== Wedding attire ===
Shinto brides and grooms typically wear kimono. However, the groom can wear a Western-style business suit during the process. The bride will wear a number of layers of kimono, the outermost layer being the most formal. A bride will either wear a colourful uchikake (打ち掛け) over-kimono, or a pure-white shiromuku (白無垢, lit. "white pure-innocence") over-kimono. The uchikake, a garment derived from the ostentatious over-kimono worn by samurai women before the Meiji Restoration, is typically a colourful over-kimono, made of a heavy brocade fabric that may feature a woven design or embroidery and couching in gold and silver thread. The shiromuku is also derived in part from the dress of the samurai classes, but is instead solid white in colour, featuring only woven designs, also in white. Though uchikake are often red, white and black - all auspicious colours in Shinto - they may also feature other colours as part of their design.

Both uchikake and shiromuku are highly-formal kimono, designed to be worn over the actual kimono and obi unfastened, and are typically silk or imitation silk. Due to the high cost of new kimono, and the particularly high cost of brand-new formal kimono, a bride may only hire out the ensemble for the day, instead of purchasing it new, or may wear an ensemble passed down through the family or borrowed. Brides typically wear a wig (katsura) dressed in a traditional style, dressed in a set of auspiciously designed hair accessories. The bride may change into a red kimono for the wedding reception events after the ceremony for good luck.

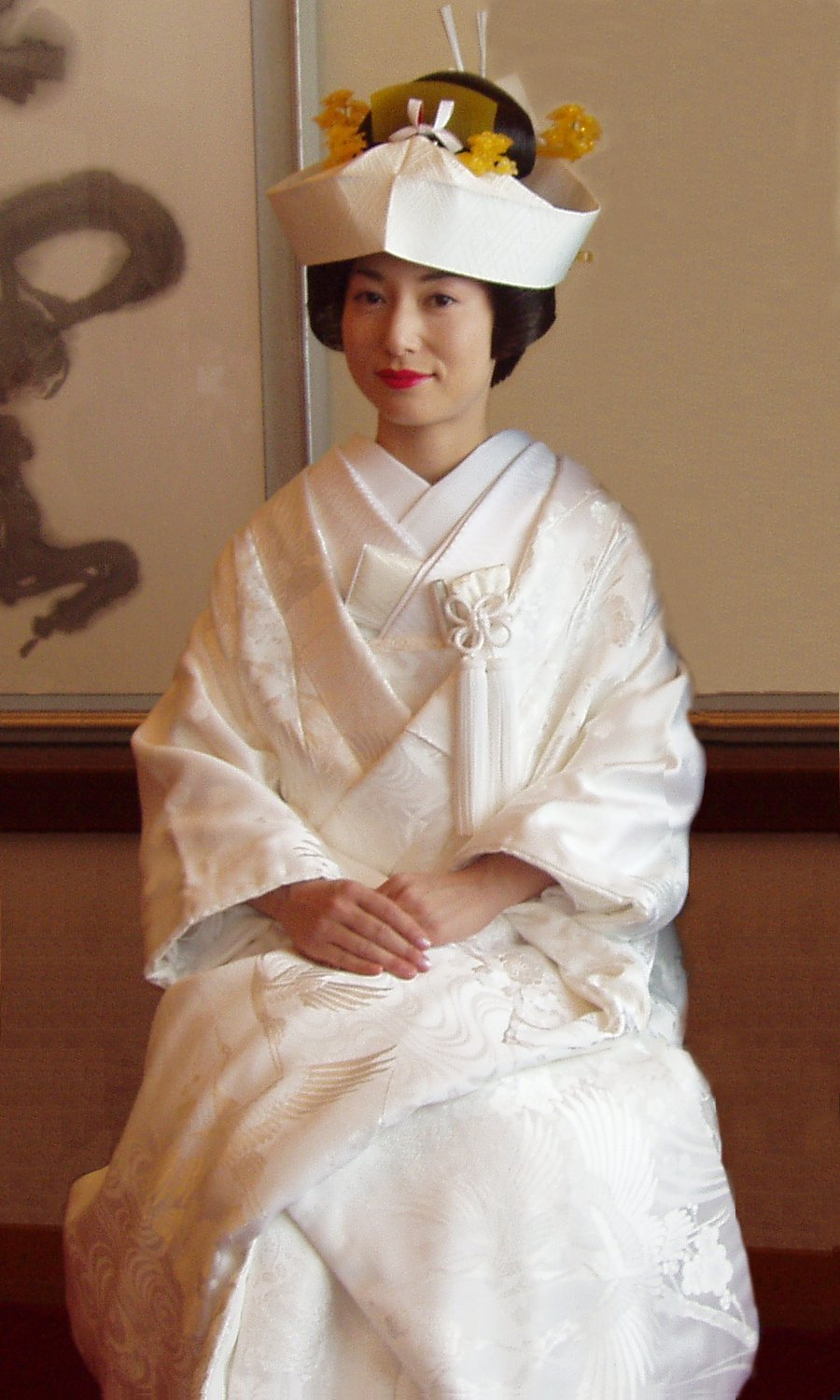
Japanese formal wedding kimono shiromuku

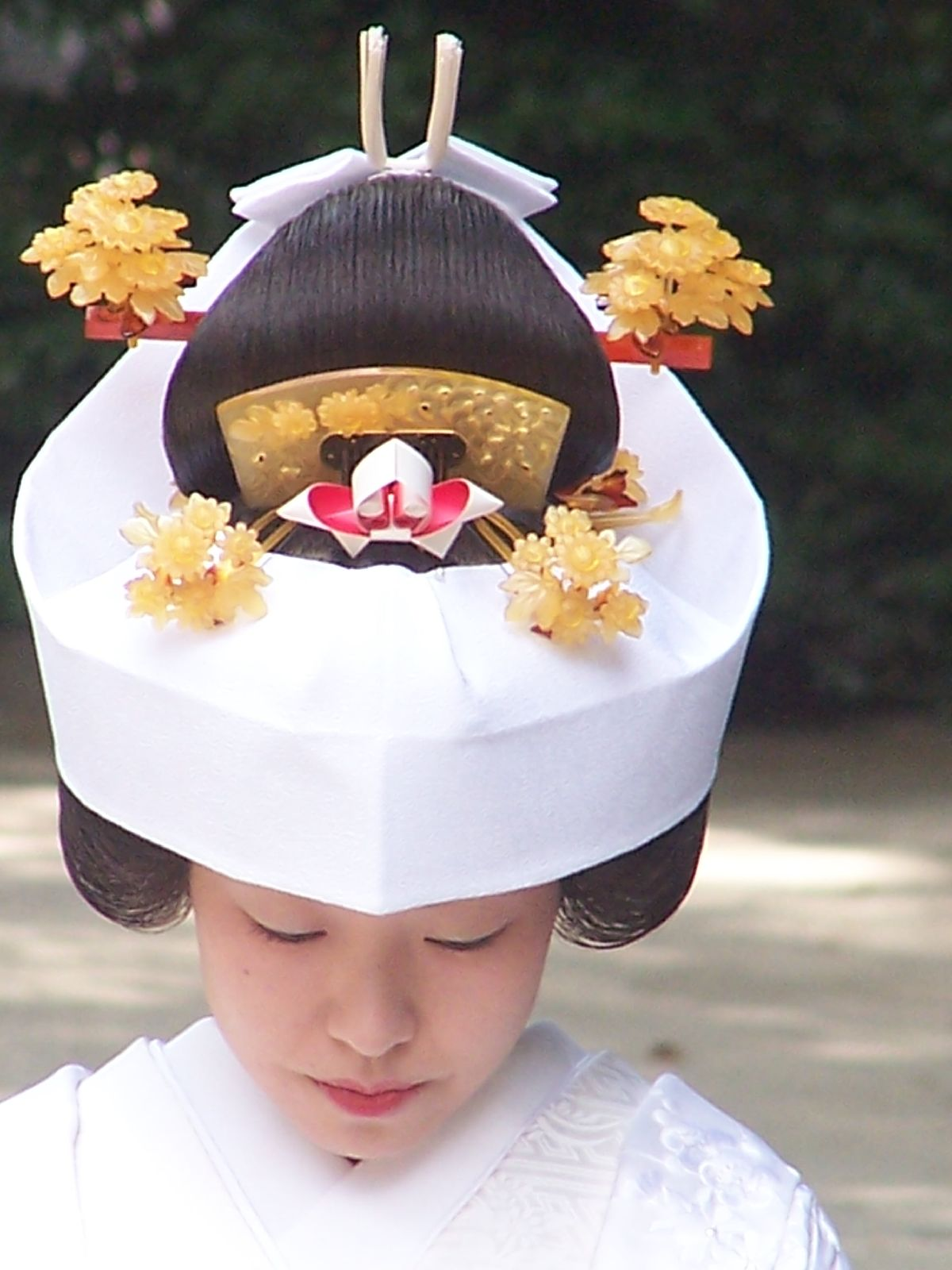
A bride at a Shinto wedding shows her wig and tsuno-kakushi headdress.

Brides may also wear one of two styles of headdress. The tsunokakushi (角隠し, lit. "horn-hiding") headdress, made from a rectangular piece of cloth, often white silk, which covers the high topknot of the bunkin takashimada-style wig typically worn by the bride. The bunkin takashimada is said to be worn to veil the bride's metaphorical horns of jealousy, ego and selfishness, and also to symbolize the bride's resolve to become a gentle and obedient wife. The wataboshi (綿帽子, lit. "cotton hood") headdress, an all-white hood or cowl, may also be worn as the Japanese equivalent to the Western bridal veil; its purpose is to hide the bride's face from all others except the bridegroom until the end of the wedding ceremony. The wataboshi was adapted from the katsuki, a hood worn outdoors by married women in samurai families from the Muromachi to Momoyama period, before it was taken up by younger women from the Edo period onwards. Like the shiromuku it accompanies, the wataboshi is a symbol of innocence and purity; it is worn only outside and only in accompaniment with the shiromuku, and is removed during indoor receptions.

== Origins and early history ==
The Shinto wedding is a modern invention. The first mention of a wedding in a Shinto manual was in 1872; weddings were not reported until the 1880s. These weddings were limited to the families of Shinto priests. Earlier Shinto weddings were a family gathering without religious significance, aside from the occasional appearance of female dancers, katsurame, said to protect the bride from demons.

Scholars suggest that the adoption of religious wedding ceremonies was driven by the decline of state-sponsored Shinto shrines during the 1880s. A rash of new ceremonies emerged in this period, including visits for newborns and on certain birthdays.

=== The wedding of Prince Yoshihito ===
Prince Yoshihito married Kujo Sadako in a Shinto ceremony at the Imperial Palace in 1900, one of the first ceremonies of its kind. The wedding reflected a change in Meiji-era thinking about marriage, which had recently legally allowed for marriage to be a balanced partnership between husband and wife.

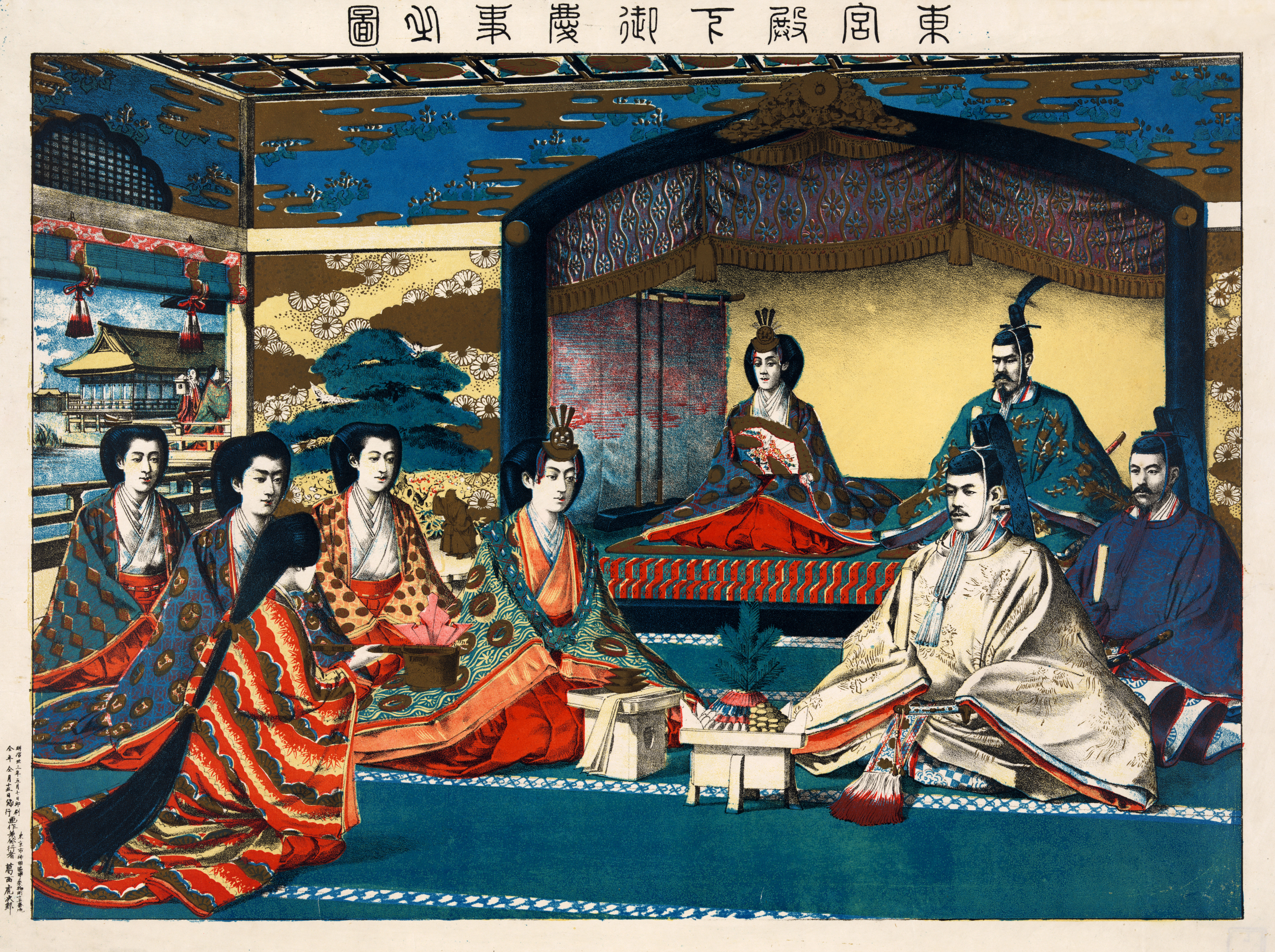
An illustration of the first contemporary Shinto wedding ceremony, the 1900 marriage of Crown Prince Yoshihito and Princess Kujo Sadako.

The next Shinto wedding ceremony was performed at Tokyo's Hibiya Daijingu shrine in 1901. Later, shrines such as Ueno Shimotani and Tokyo's Izumo Grand Shrine hosted wedding ceremonies. These ceremonies, concentrated in Tokyo, were still limited to elites. Soon, wedding ceremonies were performed in more cities, starting in Osaka and Kyoto, and began to attract the donation of larger dowries.

== Post-war weddings ==
After being stripped of its status as a state religion in 1945, there came a rapid rise in the democratization of Shinto wedding ceremonies, and, in turn, the number of people choosing them. This also reflected a mass movement of families into cities and smaller homes, which made it more difficult to host domestic ceremonies.

This period also saw the rise of the commercial wedding industry, which grew out of collaboratives that lent large venues for wedding ceremonies.

In the 1950s, invoking a single "God of Marriage" during weddings was common, as well as young girls and the bride and groom making offerings to the kami, who was often seen as a single god with an aspect or "Spirit" being offered to and invoked during weddings. This being was and is popularly thought to be Ōkuninushi.

== Contemporary Japanese weddings ==
Japanese Shinto weddings are overseen by priests, but often take place in hotels or in special venues designed to accommodate weddings. As Japan's marriage rate declines, fewer Shinto weddings are being performed; the number has dropped from 90% of ceremonies to 50% since the 1990s. Japanese weddings more often reflect a Christian wedding ceremony, regardless of the personal faith of the married couple.

== See also ==
- Family law in Japan
- Women in Japan
