= Autobiography of a Geisha =

Autobiography of former Japanese geisha Sayo Masuda

- Author: Sayo Masuda
- Original title: 芸者、苦闘の半生涯
- Translator: G. G. Rowley
- Publication date: 1957
- English publication date: 2003

Autobiography of a Geisha (芸者、苦闘の半生涯, Geisha, kutō no hanshōgai; "Geisha, Half a Lifetime of Pain and Struggle") is a book by Sayo Masuda (増田 小夜, Masuda Sayo). It was first published in Japan in 1957, and the English translation by G. G. Rowley was published in 2003. Masuda wrote her autobiography between the years of 1956 and 1957 in response to a magazine ad for a non-fiction women's writing competition. Having never learned to read kanji, Masuda wrote the entire book in hiragana, with her editors carefully working to convert her writing into standard kanji while preserving the feeling of her original writing.

== Autobiography ==
=== Early life ===
As a child, Masuda lived as a nurse-maid in a large farming household near Shiojiri, where she suffered under little food, poor sleeping quarters and frequent punishment. Masuda initially spent most of her time looking after the owners' young children, but, after being caught taking melons from the field to feed herself, was forced into manual labour instead.

During these years, other children gave her the derisive nickname "Crane", as Masuda was not allowed to wear socks, causing her to lift one leg up to warm it on the thigh of the other leg during winter; this nickname continued even when Masuda began to work as a geisha. Masuda did not learn of her real name until she was hospitalised aged 12.

=== Geisha career ===
When Masuda was 12, her mother, needing to pay for her husband's medical treatment, agreed for Masuda's uncle to retrieve her from the landowners she had been working for in order to sell her to an okiya (geisha house) in Suwa, Nagano named the Takenoya.

Due to her illiteracy and total lack of education and etiquette, the geisha gave her another nickname, "Low", mocking her "low intelligence". Masuda was also frequently mocked for her darker, sunburnt skin, as a paler complexion was considered beautiful, especially for a geisha to have. However, Masuda's "elder sister" Karuta, the second-oldest geisha in the okiya, worked with Masuda to help her through her training, starting a lifelong friendship between the two.

Soon after Masuda's arrival, one of the other geisha in the okiya, Takemi, died of peritonitis caused by gonorrhea, and her refusal to seek medical treatment in the hopes of hastening her death greatly influenced Masuda's perception of living as hell and dying as paradise. Takemi's death lead to Karuta beginning to drink very heavily, leading to confrontations with the head of the okiya. During one such confrontation, Masuda intervened on Karuta's behalf; this incident led to Masuda being thrown down the stairs, breaking her right leg. This injury landed her in the hospital, where she learned her real name.

While Masuda was recovering in the hospital, she and Karuta pledged to commit suicide by throwing themselves in front of a train; however, after Karuta had carried Masuda to the tracks on her back, they backed away from the train before it hit them, leading to Masuda falling on her broken leg and leaving her with a serious infection by the following day. It took several days to heal, nearly requiring amputation and ultimately leaving Masuda with a large scar that she was self-conscious of for the rest of her life. Masuda's real mother came to visit her for just four days, leaving Masuda alone in the hospital once again. She eventually recovered and returned to the okiya, where she debuted as an apprentice.

As Masuda got closer to becoming a full-fledged geisha, her work became increasingly sexual in nature; upon debuting, Masuda underwent a practice known as mizuage with a man nicknamed Cockeye. After this, Masuda was sold four more times by the owner of the okiya under the pretense of having never had sex, generating a huge profit for the okiya. A year later, Cockeye bought out her contract as a geisha and she went to live with him and his mistress. Masuda despised Cockeye, eventually convincing him to let her get a job at a factory. There, she caught the eye of a man named Motoyama, and they quickly fell in love; however, she was unable to keep their relationship from Cockeye and had to stop seeing Motoyama. Upon receiving a letter stating that he was leaving, Masuda once again attempted suicide by trying to drown herself; however, she was pulled out by someone who happened to be fishing nearby.

=== After her geisha career ===
After Masuda was released from the hospital, she ran from Cockeye, eventually returning to Shiojiri to look for family. She located her aunt and a younger brother, convincing her aunt to get her a job at the sawmill she worked at, before deciding to find a job that could pay better. Masuda travelled to Chiba to find Karuta. When she realized she needed to get money for the train fare, the only person she could get it from was Hii, who made her dance naked in return. When she arrived in Chiba, the house she and Karuta were staying in was destroyed in a firebomb raid. She worked several jobs until she got a job at a restaurant. While she was there, she received two marriage proposals. The second, from the son of the restaurant's owner, caused Masuda to leave the restaurant — although she was only 21, she already had a long history as a geisha and felt that she could not risk ruining his reputation by marrying him.

She and her brother joined a group of people foraging for food in the countryside to resell in the city, and there she met a Korean man who gave her another job selling soap. She did this for two and a half years, when in the summer of 1952 her brother contracted intestinal tuberculosis and was hospitalized. His penicillin shots were 600 yen each, and Masuda soon realized that the only way to make enough money for them was to become a sex worker. Although she kept her work hidden from her brother, he felt he was placing an undue burden on her and committed suicide. She decided to bury him next to their father, returning to Shiojiri to do so.

When Masuda returned, she caught a cold and was bedridden with a high fever. Her old lover, Motoyama, had returned to nearby Suwa and had become a city councilor; when he heard that she had returned, he sought her out and found her a place to live. Despite the fact that Motoyama had married and had a child, they began to see each other regularly. Around this time, Masuda learned to read hiragana and kept a diary of their encounters. However, when elections for city council came near, at the urging of Motoyama's wife, Masuda left him to improve his chances of being reelected.

Masuda moved to Toyoshina, where Karuta had opened a restaurant, but her longing for Motoyama caused her to start uncontrollably drinking. She became bloated and jaundiced, but continued to drink even after her doctor warned her she would soon die of liver failure if she continued. Despite the urgings of her doctor and Karuta, Masuda attempted suicide a third time. After visiting her brother's grave, she tried to freeze herself to death and had almost succeeded when an elderly man found and rescued her. He convinced her to make one more attempt at having a good living, and she returned to Toyoshina.

=== Later years ===
Upon returning to Toyoshina, Masuda got a job as a waitress, and discovered a love for children. She frequently told stories to groups of children in town. Paradoxically, she also played tricks on people around town, trying to humble geisha or anyone she saw holding their status over others. Eventually, she heard that farmers in the area were desperate for people to work the rice fields, and over their protestations went to work there. When the rice was planted, she was asked by a family to look after their children, the end of her autobiography.

== Later life ==
After being a caretaker for several years, Masuda opened a restaurant and ran it for several decades. She and Karuta, who opened and ran a restaurant until three years before her death, remained friends. However, Karuta, who had fought to save Masuda from alcoholism, herself became an alcoholic. Her death in the mid-1990s was a huge blow to Masuda. On June 8, 2008, Masuda found out she had liver cancer, and died a few weeks later on June 26, 2008.

In the English version of the book, G. G. Rowley wrote an afterword detailing her attempts to meet Masuda in person. Masuda almost exclusively communicated through her publishers. At the time of the English translation's publication in 2003, they had declined Rowley's request, saying that Masuda wished to keep as low a profile as possible. However, in 2004 Masuda made a personal request for Rowley to visit her in Nagano, making Rowley one of the only people who she agreed to meet with. Afterwards they remained in touch for the rest of Masuda's life.

== Messages ==
Throughout her autobiography, Masuda projects the idea that parents should be responsible for their children and should not bear children they are not prepared to support. When she found an abandoned six-month-old baby, she felt the desire to quickly kill it so it would not have to suffer a slow death or the ignominy of growing up without parents. Though Masuda never married and never had children, caring for the children of others was always her favorite way to spend time.

Masuda vehemently argued against the prohibition of prostitution in Japan. She stated that although no-one became a prostitute to enjoy it, it was merely human instinct to find a way to make a living when no other venues were open. Although she agreed it was probably well-intentioned, Masuda stated that she could not have survived if sex work had not been an option for her. Furthermore, she argued that simply banning prostitution would not stop people from engaging in it, as people who wanted it would inevitably find ways.

== Reception ==
Although Masuda finished second in the writing competition, after writing Autobiography of a Geisha, Masuda was harshly criticised by her community, and eventually had to move to another town. Largely because of this, she almost always communicated with people through her publisher, emphasising that her goal was only to tell her story and never to become famous. She refused to meet with most people interested in discussing her book. Upon its translation into English, the book received positive reviews from anthropologist Liza Dalby and author Arthur Golden, as well as several other book reviewers.

Despite academic reviews, the book has been largely ignored in many publications about geisha. In her autobiography Geisha, a Life (also known as Geisha of Gion), published in 2002, Mineko Iwasaki claims to be the first geisha to come forward to tell her story. Many scholars echo this claim despite the fact that Masuda's work was published 45 years before Iwasaki's.
