= Misedashi =

Ceremony where an aspiring apprentice geisha debuts as an apprentice geisha

Misedashi (店だし, 'making business public') is a ceremony where a minarai (an aspiring apprentice geisha) becomes a maiko (an apprentice geisha) and officially begins their career. The maiko is guided around her local area to call on businesses, teachers, and other okiya by her okiya's otokoshi (male dresser) to thank her teachers and peers for their support and to let them know of her debut.

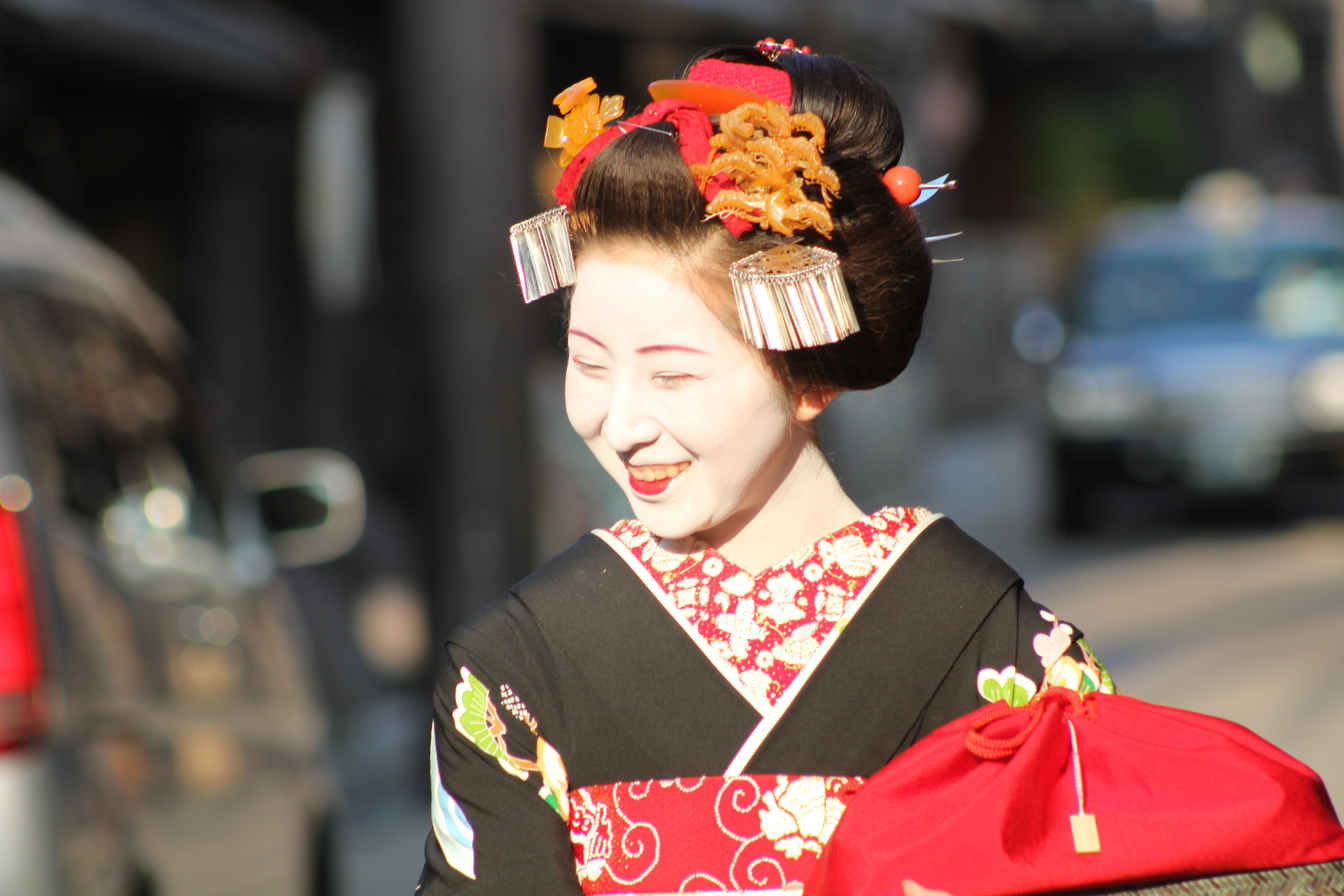
A maiko on the day of her misedashi

Maiko are usually 17 or 18 when this ceremony takes place as post-WWII labor laws prevent maiko from beginning their employment as apprentices at an earlier age as in pre-WWII eras. Some apprentices, however, skip the maiko stage, being too old to debut as a young apprentice, and instead begin their apprenticeship appearing as a geisha.

== Attire ==
Because the debut is considered one of the most important moments of a geisha's career, only the most formal attire is worn.

Wareshinobu (割れしのぶ)
The wareshinobu is a traditional hairstyle worn by junior maiko. A bun is made by inserting two lengths of padded red silk, and is then decorated with a large, short-pronged hair pin known as a kanokodome in the centre of the bun. For misedashi, apprentices wear formal hair ornaments made out of tortoiseshell, silver and red miokuri, and two bira-bira kanzashi.
Oshiroi (白粉)
Oshiroi is the white face makeup worn by geisha and maiko. Though it is usually applied by the wearer, because of the importance of the misedashi ceremony, a professional will apply the makeup.
Kuromontsuki hikizuri (黒紋付引きずり)
A kuromontsuki hikizuri (a trailing black kimono with five crests) is a formal black trailing kimono decorated with five crests of the maiko's okiya, placed on the centre back, the back of the sleeves, and the front shoulders. Hikizuri are usually 200 centimetres (79 in) in length, with a padded hem to aid the skirt in trailing across the floor. When outside, a maiko will hold her hikizuri up with her hands or tie it in place so that it does not touch the ground.
Darari obi (だらり帯)
The darari obi is a 6–7 metres (20–23 ft) long belt worn exclusively by maiko. The end of the obi is decorated with the crest of the okiya the maiko belongs to. For formal occasions, maiko wear a gold brocade obi.

== See also ==
- Mizuage
- Maiko

== Bibliography ==
- Liza Dalby (2000). Geisha. Vintage. ISBN 978-0099428992.
