= Tsunokakushi =

Traditional headdress worn by brides in some Shinto weddings

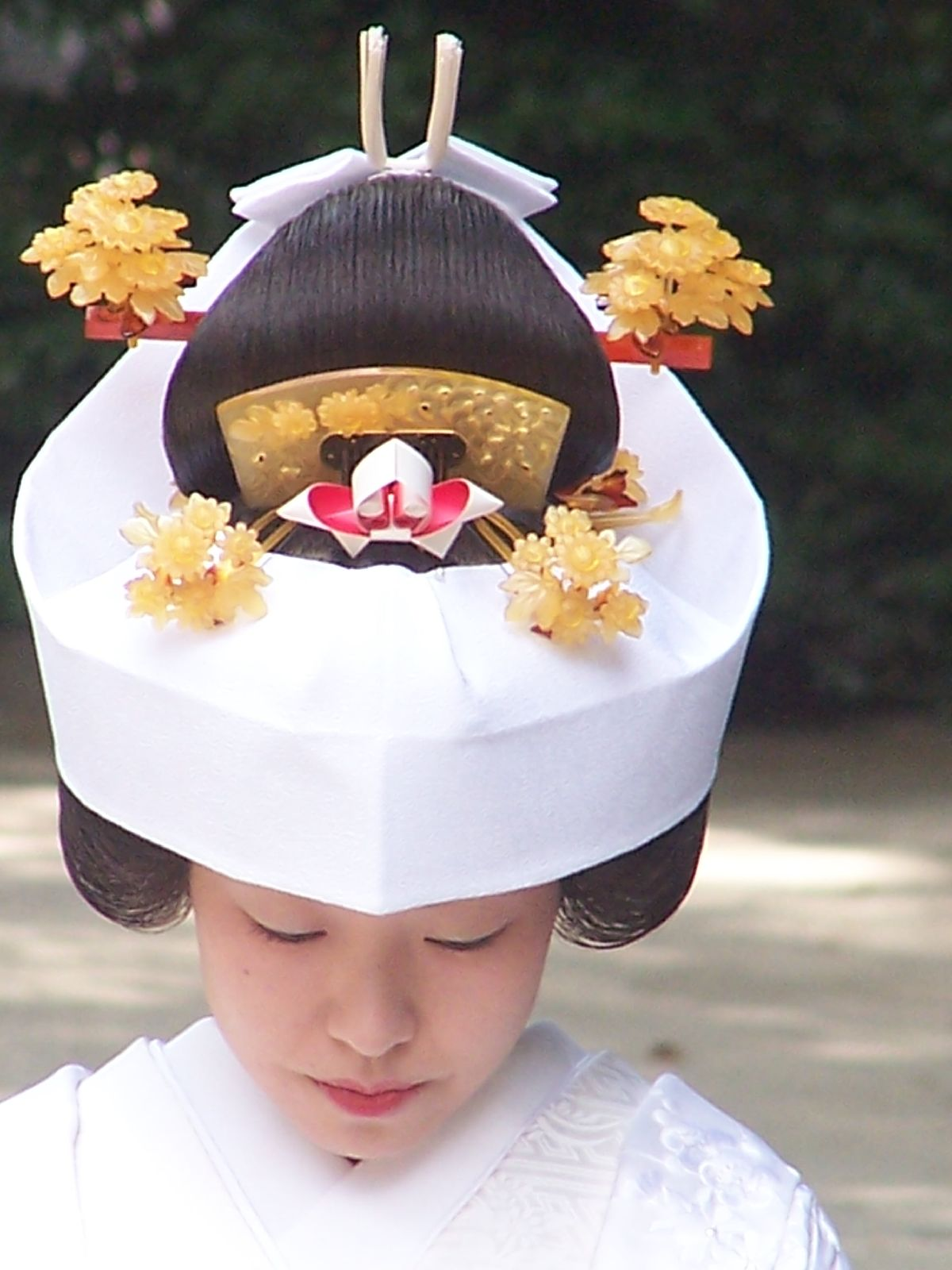
Japanese bride in her tsunokakushi

The Tsunokakushi (角隠し) is a type of traditional headdress worn by brides in Shinto wedding ceremonies in Japan. This is made from a rectangular piece of cloth folded and worn to partially cover bride's hair (in modern days, often a wig), worn in the traditionally-styled bunkin takashimada (文金高島田). The tsunokakushi is typically made of white silk, matching the bride's formal kimono outfit.

== Etymology ==
The term is a compound of 角 (tsuno, "horn") + 隠し (kakushi, "hiding"). This derivation is listed in some sources as a reference to hiding a bride's "horns" of anger, jealousy, or other negative qualities, in order to present a more virtuous image for the wedding. However, this interpretation might be a folk etymology resulting from a shift in the reading and meaning.

This specific headdress is described as arising in the Edo period as something worn by women when visiting a Buddhist temple. In certain Buddhist sects, women visitors to temples were required to cover their hairlines in front, also known as the 角 (sumi, literally “corner”; the hairline sense possibly in reference to a widow's peak, or in reference to the top "edge" or "corners" of the forehead), the same portion of the hairline that was traditionally shaved off in men's fashions. The headdress may have been known originally as a 角隠し (sumi kakushi, literally “front-hairline hider”).

Such a shift may have been facilitated by the existence of partial synonym 角帽子 (tsuno bōshi, literally “horn hat”, also read as sumi bōshi in different contexts), originally referring to a different kind of headdress used since at least the Heian period of 794–1185. This consisted of a triangular piece of material with one corner pointing straight up from the wearer's forehead, and 角 (tsuno, “horn”) referred to the peak of the triangle.

== See also ==
- Wedding
