= Sakko =

Sakko may refer to:

- Sakko (clothing) (also Sacco), a type of jacket
- Sakkō, a Japanese hairstyle
