= Onna-bori =

Remains of irrigation canal in Japan

- 女堀 (Japanese)
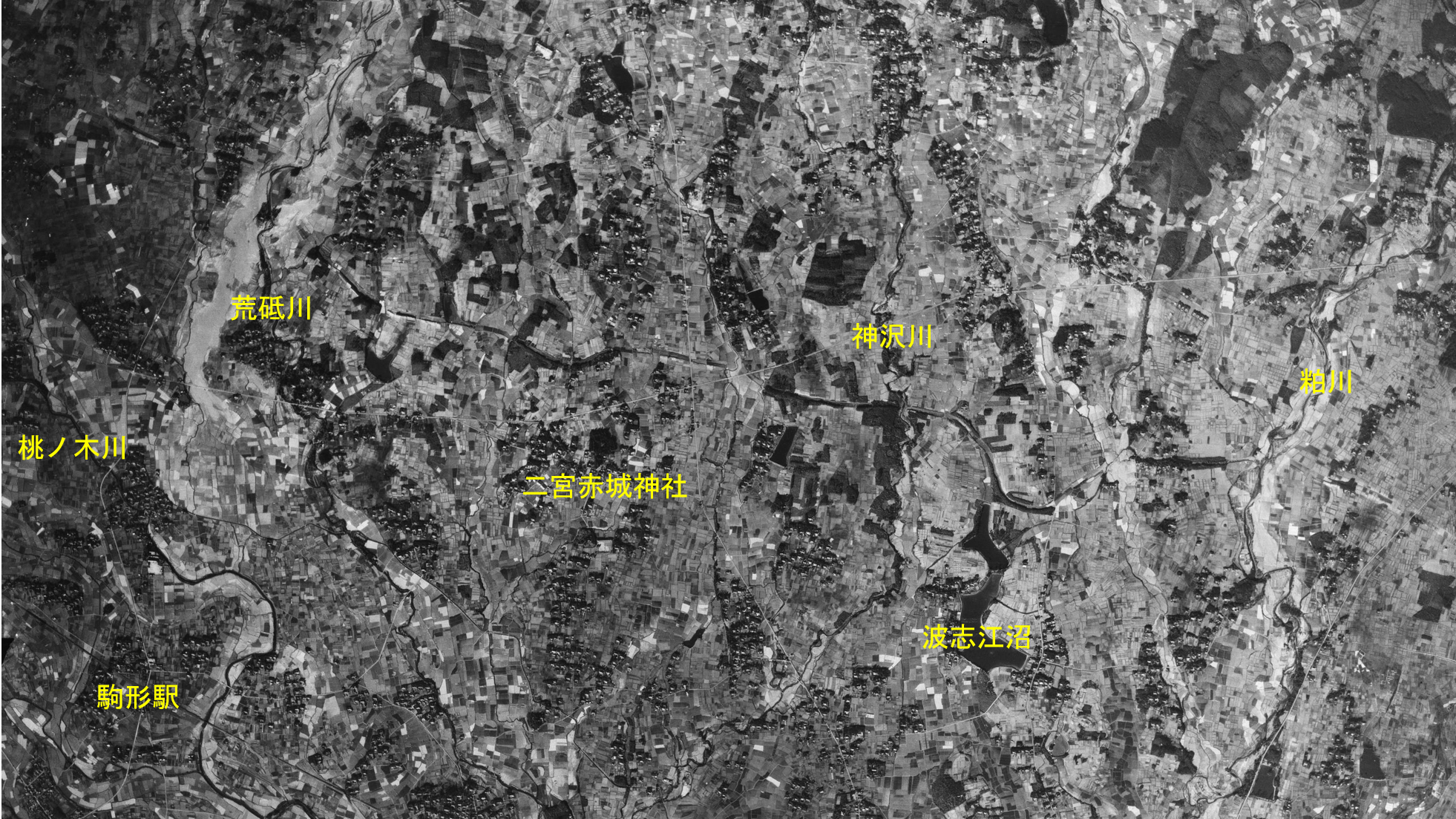
- Aerial photograph of Onna-bori in 1947

- Onna-bori Onna-bori (Japan)
- 36°22′10″N 139°11′12″E
- Periods: Kamakura period
- Location: Isesaki and Maebashi, Japan
- Region: Kantō region

Site notes
- Public access: Yes

The Onna-bori (女堀) was an irrigation canal dating the from Heian period, the remnants of which are located in what is now the cities of Maebashi, and Isesaki, Gunma Prefecture in the northern Kantō region of Japan. The six surviving disconnected portions were collectively designated a National Historic Site of Japan in 1983.

== Overview ==
The Onna-bori extends from an elevation of 100 meters on Mount Akagi for some thirteen kilometers east to west, and with a width of between 15 and 30 meters and a depth of three to four meters.

The origins of the Onna-bori are uncertain. According to legend, it was made by a woman using her kanzashi hairpin in one night. Other legends attribute it to the semi-legendary Empress Suiko or to the Kamakura period Hōjō Masako. Per another theory, the kanji of its name are a corruption of "媼堀", meaning literally "useless ditch" alluding to the fact that it was never completed. In 1979, archaeological evidence indicates that a portion of the canal was dug through a layer of soil which had been created by the 1108 eruption of Mount Asama, placing the date of its construction to sometime in the 12th century. There were a number of large shōen estates between Mount Akai and the Tone River in Kōzuke Province during this period; however, with the rise mutually antagonistic landlords during the Muromachi period, the canal was never completed, and eventually many portion were destroyed or were diverted for other uses.

== See also ==
- List of Historic Sites of Japan (Gunma)
