= Tokyo Daijingu =

Shrine in Tokyo, Japan

Coordinates: 35.7000°N 139.7469°E

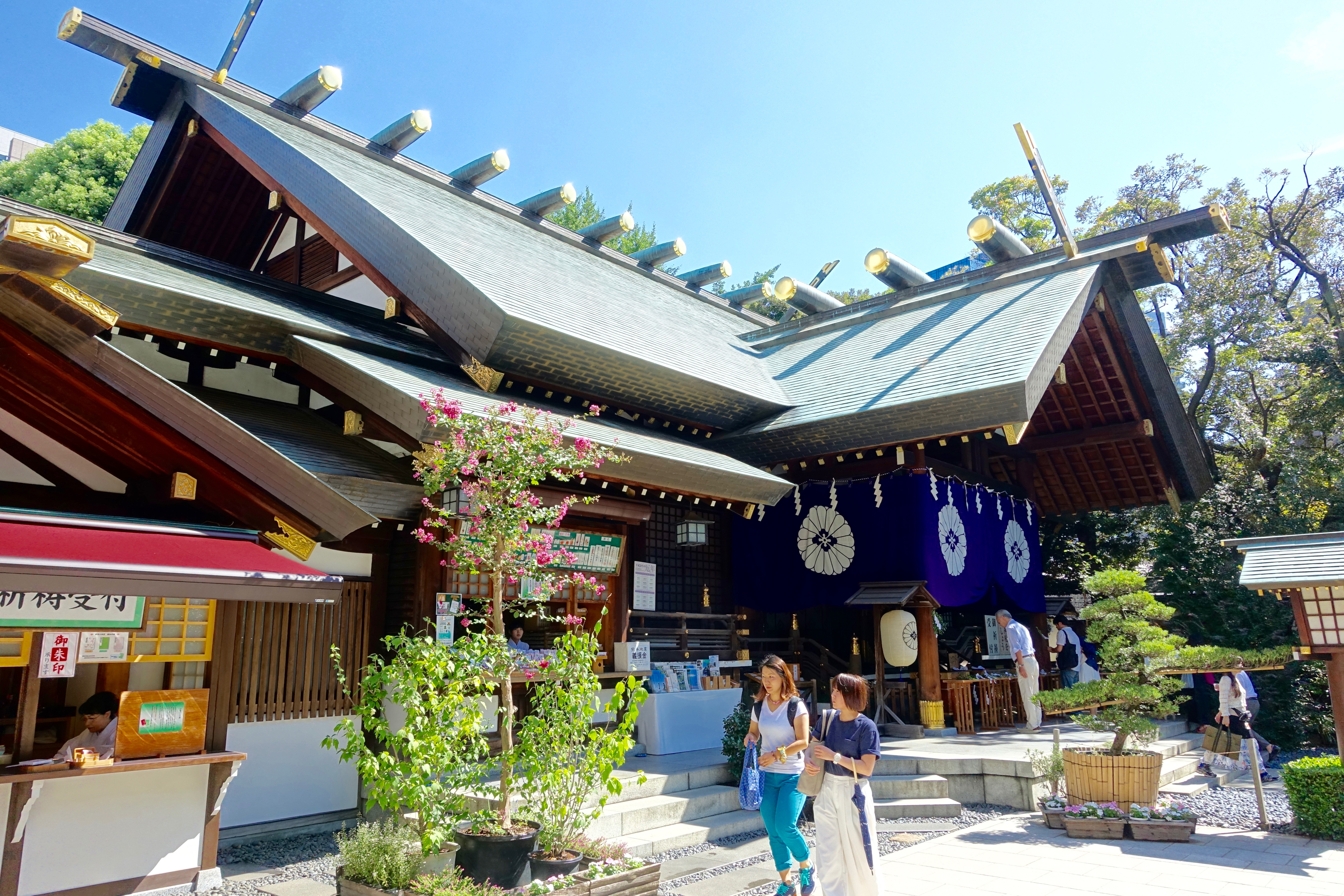

Religion
- Affiliation: Shinto
- Deity: Amaterasu; Ukemochi; Ame-no-Minakanushi; Takamimusubi; Kamimusubi

Location
- Location: Address : 2-4-1, Fujimi, Chiyoda-ku, Tokyo, 102-0071 Japan

Website
- http://www.tokyodaijingu.or.jp/index.html

Tokyo Daijingu (東京大神宮) is a shrine located in Tokyo. The shrine is also called O-Ise-sama in Tokyo because of the deities enshrined there. It is one of the top five shrines in Tokyo.

== History ==
The shrine was built in the early Meiji period by Jingu-kyo so people in Tokyo could worship the deities enshrined at Grand Shrine of Ise from afar. The shrine was originally called Hibiya Daijingu (日比谷大神宮).

In 1901, a wedding took place at the shrine, being the first Shinto wedding held in an urban area.

After the Kanto Earthquake, the shrine was moved to Iidabashi in 1928 and renamed to Iidabashi Daijingu. Following the end of World War II, the name of the shrine was changed to Tokyo Daijingu.

== Enshrined kami ==
Deities enshrined here include:

- Amaterasu
- Toyouke-no-Ohkami
- Ameno-Minakanushi
- Takamimusubi
- Kamimusubi
- Yamatohime-no-mikoto

== Gallery ==
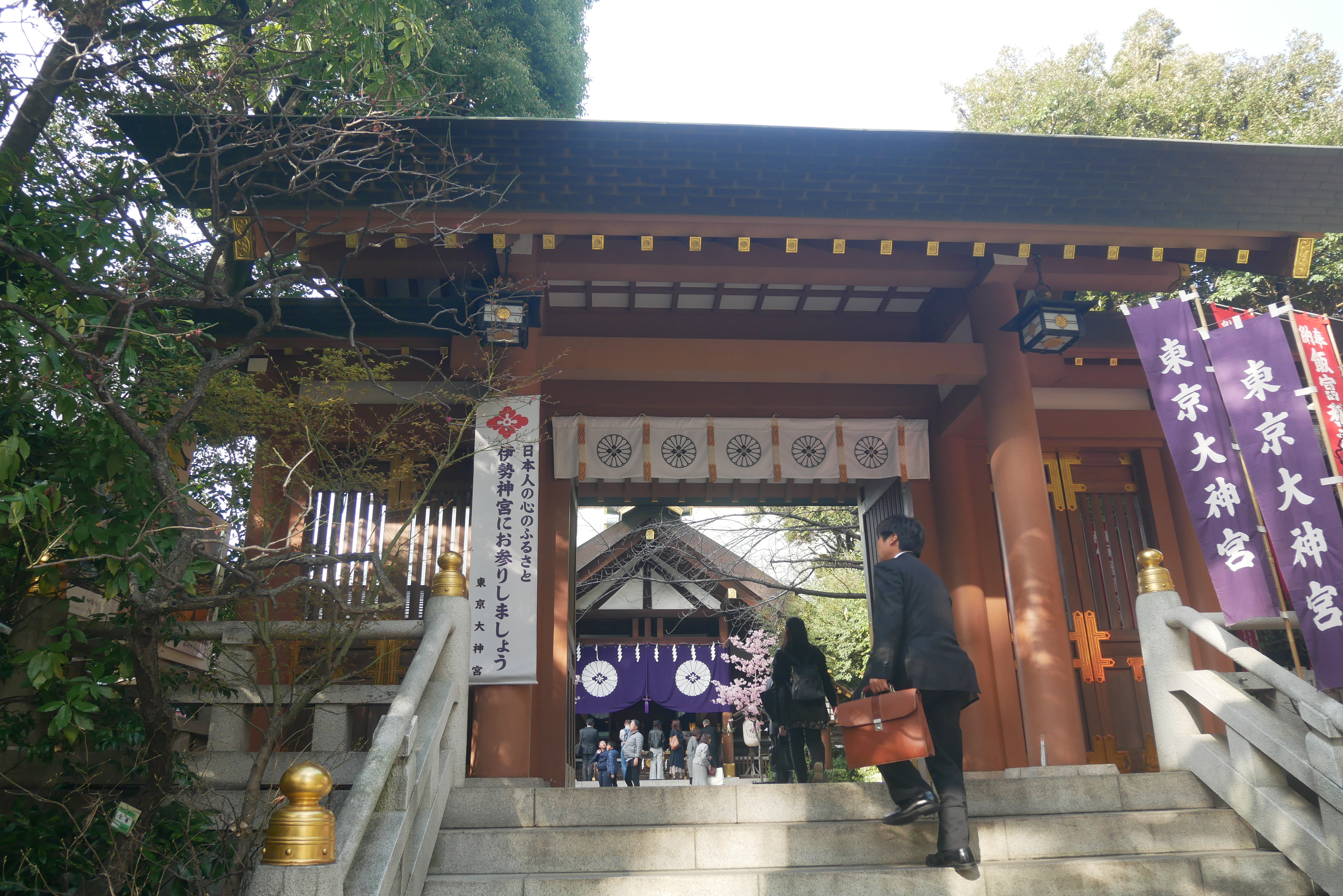

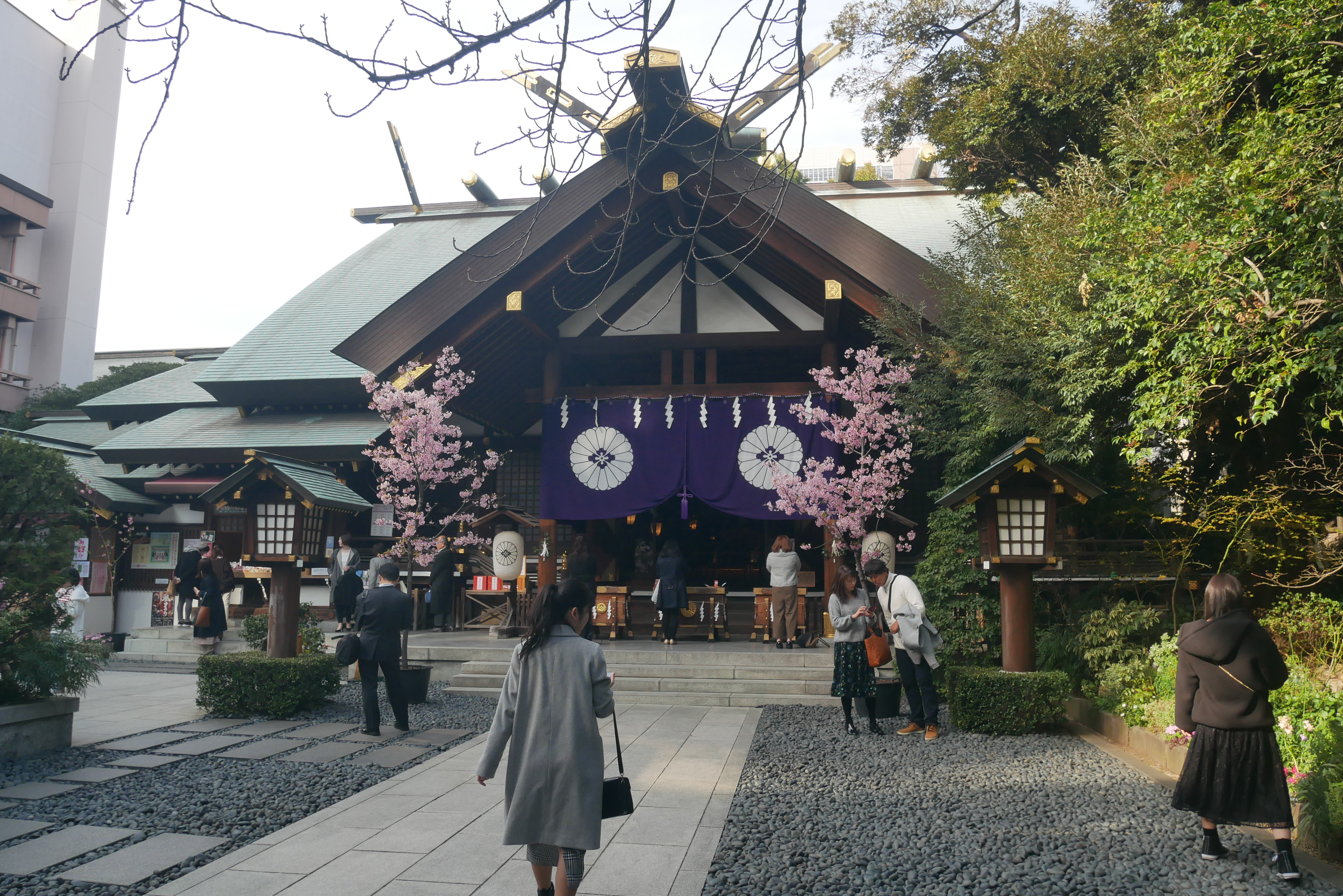

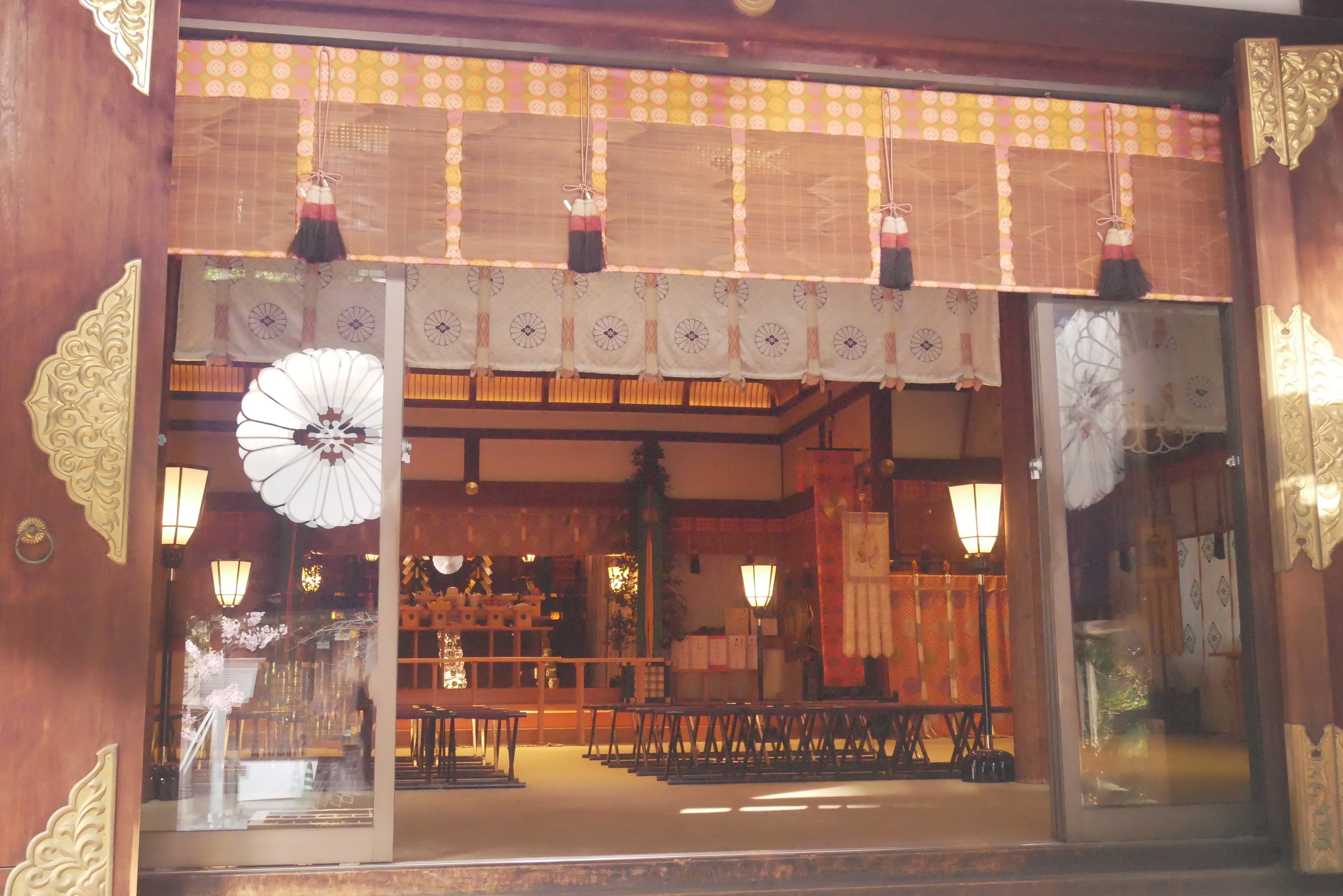

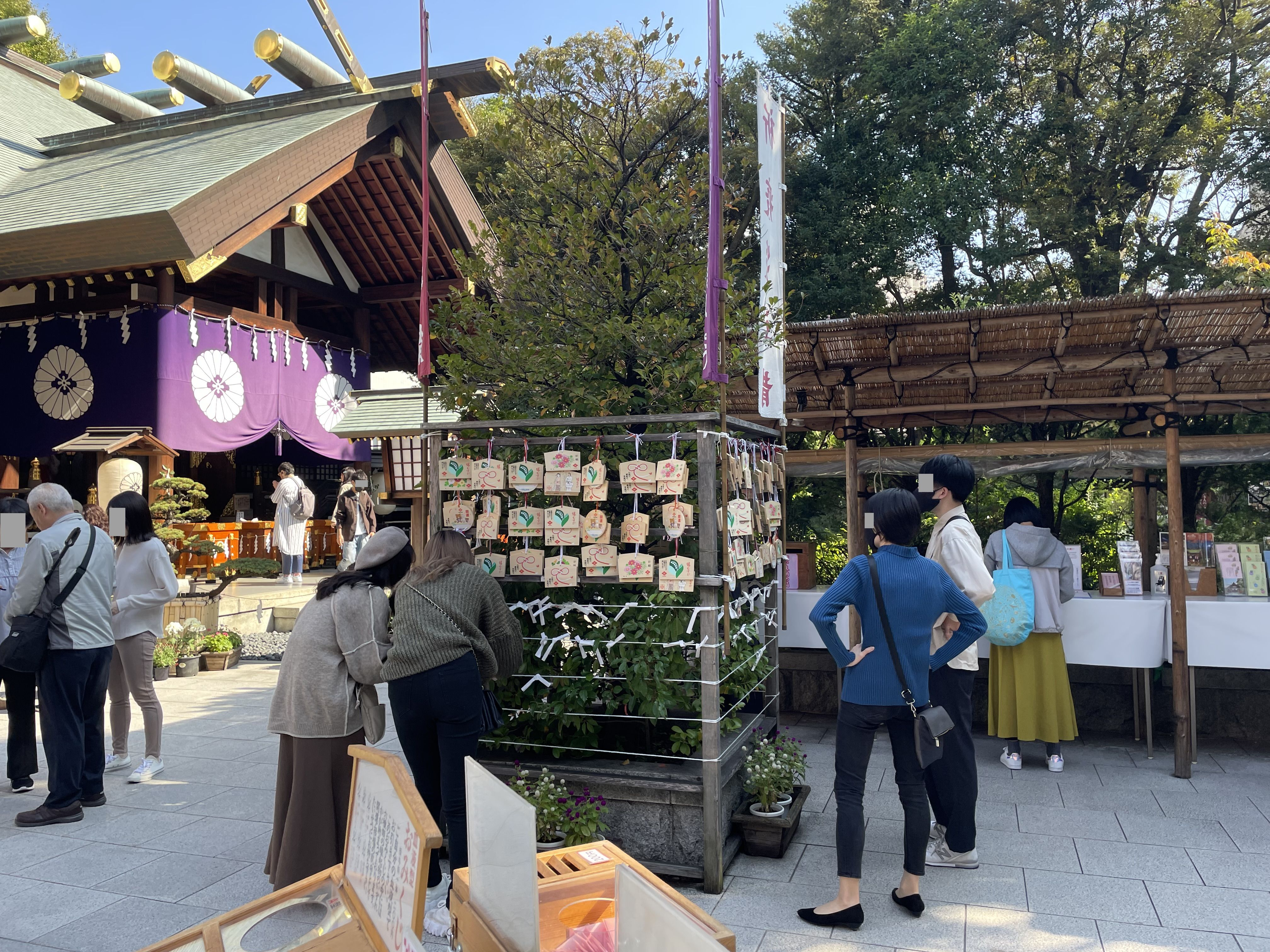
