= Erikae =

Ceremony for apprentice geisha graduating to full geisha status

Erikae (襟替え, 'the turning of the collar') is the ceremony where an apprentice geisha graduates to become a geisha. The occasion is marked by a number of ceremonies and changes in appearance, such as wearing a plain white collar on the underkimono (juban) instead of the embroidered red-and-white attached collar (han'eri) worn by apprentices. The hairstyle worn by an apprentice also changes: from a variety of different styles constructed with her own hair to the shimada-style wig worn by geisha.
