= Liza Dalby =

American writer and anthropologist (born 1950)

Liza Crihfield Dalby
- Born: 1950 (age 75–76); United States of America
- Other names: Kikuko (name given to Dalby as a teenager living in Japan), Ichigiku (市菊) (name given when informally working as a geisha in the 1970s)
- Citizenship: United States
- Education: Stanford University (PhD)
- Occupations: Anthropologist, geisha
- Known for: anthropologist and novelist specializing in Japanese culture
- Website: www.lizadalby.com

Liza Crihfield Dalby (born 1950) is an American anthropologist and novelist. She is pecialized in Japanese culture and is considered an expert in the study of the geisha community.

For her graduate studies, Dalby studied and performed fieldwork in the geisha community of Ponto-chō, which she wrote about in her Ph.D. dissertation The institution of the geisha in modern Japanese society.

Dalby's first book, Geisha, was based on her early research. The next book, Kimono: Fashioning Culture is about traditional Japanese clothing and the history of the kimono. This was followed with a fictional account of the Heian era noblewoman Murasaki Shikibu, titled The Tale of Murasaki. In 2007 she wrote a memoir, East Wind Melts the Ice, which was followed two years later by a second work of fiction, Hidden Buddhas.

Dalby worked as a consultant to novelist Arthur Golden and filmmaker Rob Marshall for the novel Memoirs of a Geisha and the film of the same name.

== Background ==
As a high school student, Dalby visited Japan in a student exchange program; there she learned to play the shamisen, the traditional three stringed Japanese guitar. In 1975, she returned to Japan for a year to research the geisha community, as part of her anthropology fieldwork. Dalby's research, done as part of her Ph.D. studies at Stanford University, was presented in her dissertation, and became the basis for her first book, Geisha, about the culture of the geisha community. Her study, which included interviews with more than 100 geisha, was considered to be excellent and received praise from scholars at the time of publication, although some retrospective scholarship is more critical.

During her Ph.D. studies about the geisha community, conducted first in Tokyo and then Pontochō in Kyoto, she was invited to join a geisha house in Kyoto, after her primary contact in the city, a former geisha who had gone by the name of Ichiraku in her working days, suggested it. Dalby began attending banquets under the name Ichigiku, with another geisha, Ichiume, acting as her ceremonial "older sister".

Though Dalby was fluent in Japanese and skilled at playing the shamisen, she performed at geisha parties and banquets, collectively referred to as ozashiki, in an unofficial capacity, having never undergone the rites of debuting as a geisha due to the temporary nature of her stay in Japan. As such, she was not paid for her performances, though guests and various geisha "mothers" within the community would not uncommonly give her a tip for her time. Though Dalby's experience of geisha society was conducted for academic purposes, Dalby formed strong friendships and relationships with geisha in both Kyoto and Tokyo, and came to be regarded as talented in the skills required to be a geisha:

On my last visit [to the Yamabuki okiya in Yoshichō, Tokyo]...the proprietress [of the house] felt she had to say something. "When we first met, Kikuko, you were so studious—all those serious questions that we had to try and answer. You've really changed a lot... I'd say your training in Pontochō has taken very well. What a waste to go back to your country now, when you could be such a wonderful geisha!"

== Works ==
=== Geisha ===
Dalby's first non fiction book, Geisha (filmed as American Geisha), is based on her experiences in Japan's various geisha communities, specifically within the district of Pontochō in Kyoto. In the book, Dalby writes of her experiences in both the contemporary geisha communities of the mid 1970s and the experiences of geisha in previous decades, emphasising a number of changes in the community and the profession of geisha stemming from WWII, changes in the economy and the changing status of women in wider Japanese society, amongst other issues. Dalby writes about the tightly knit geisha community, and the lives of the geisha within its hierarchical society of female artists, cutting between vignettes from her experiences in the geisha community and wider explanations of the many facets of geisha in Japanese society.

=== Kimono ===
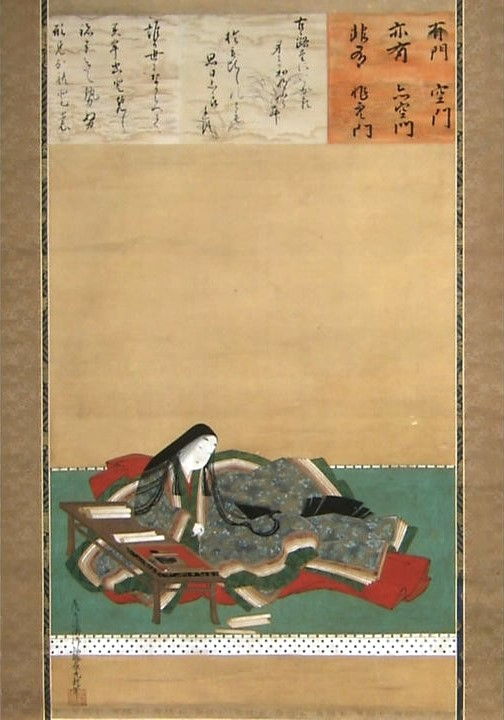
Murasaki Shikibu depicted in formal Heian period clothing in this 17th century illustration by Tosa Mitsuoki

Geisha was followed by a book about kimono, entitled Kimono: Fashioning Culture; Fashioning Culture leading on from the last chapter of Geisha, which briefly covers kimono in the context of geisha. In an interview with Salon.com, Dalby explained that in 11th century Japanese court literature, female authors such as Murasaki Shikibu wrote lengthy descriptions of the clothing people wore, with outright descriptions of people's faces or names considered highly rude and almost non-existent in Heian period literature, meaning that definitions of beauty and high fashion of the time period centred around the symbolism represented in the layering of clothing and its interaction with the depiction of nature and the seasons in Heian period art and literature. The fine interaction between clothing and art was often described in texts such as Murasaki's The Tale of Genji. In the book, Dalby presents essays about the social symbolism of the kimono, as well as its development over a period of several centuries, beginning in early 7th and 8th century Japan, through to the present status of the kimono in post WWII Japan, and the reasons behind wearing the kimono in a modern society where the kimono is no longer the predominant item of clothing.

=== The Tale of Murasaki ===
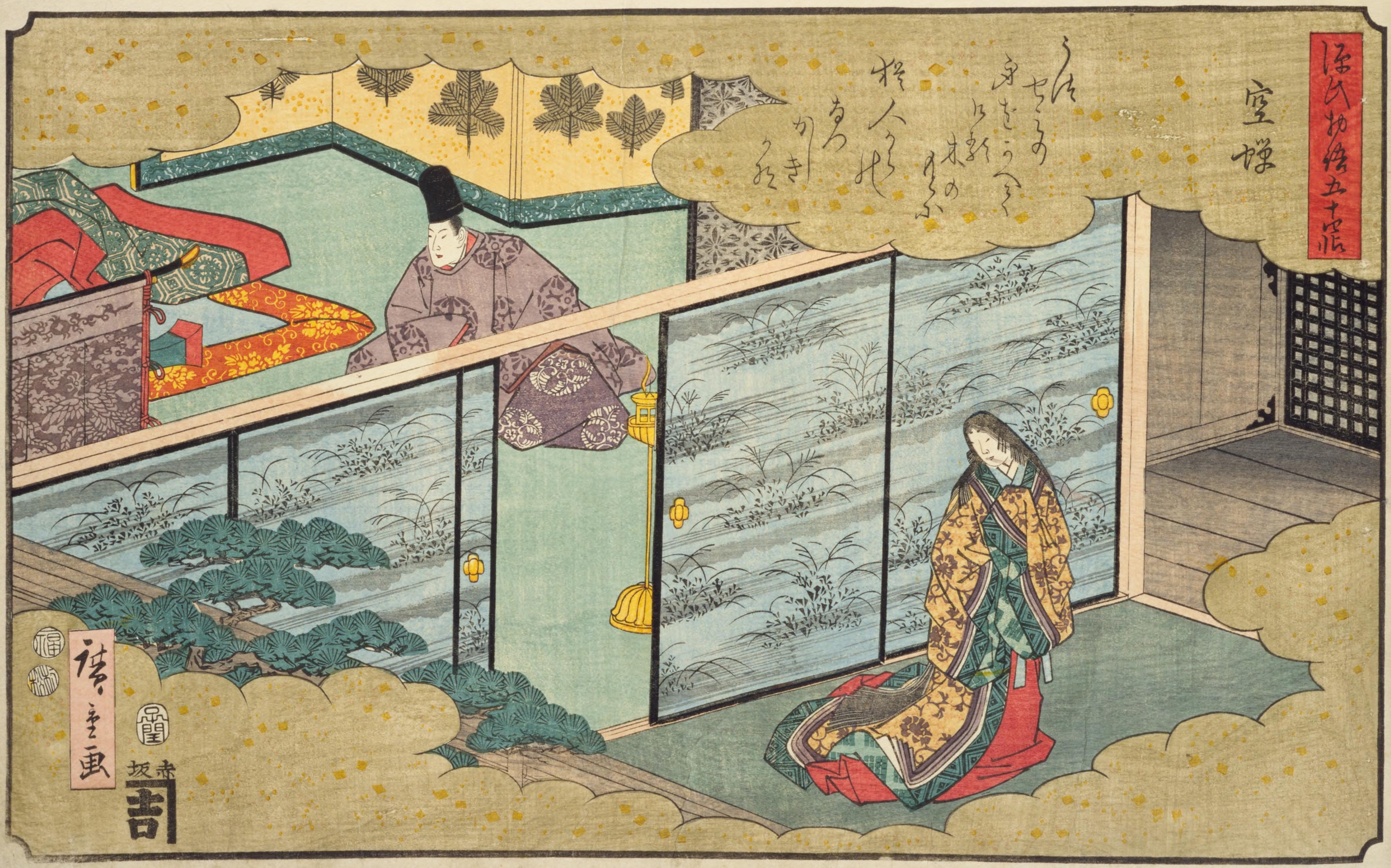
Heian era court life depicted in a 19th century ukiyo-e illustration of The Tale of Genji by Hiroshige

Dalby's The Tale of Murasaki, a fictional biography of Murasaki Shikibu, 11th century court poet, whose work The Tale of Genji is considered a classic, was published in 2000. Dalby stated her decision to write a fictional account of Murasaki's life was driven by the fact that she "couldn't contribute anything scholarly". Fascinated by an 11th century Heian period court culture oriented for the most part around poetic art and literature reflecting the natural world, Dalby wove much of it into the book, writing about the clothing the women wore; the love affairs they had; the manner in which poetry was frequently exchanged; and the seclusion of women within the Heian period court, where they were often seen by men behind screens, their faces unseen by lovers. Dalby explains that the geisha society did not develop until at least 500 years later, and that a lady-in-waiting such as Murasaki would not have had the temperament to become a geisha, due to the reserved nature expected of court women at the time.

=== East Wind Melts the Ice ===
Dalby followed The Tale of Murasaki with her memoir, entitled East Wind Melts the Ice: A Memoir Through the Seasons, published in 2007. In the book, Dalby follows a system of time and the seasons derived in ancient China, wherein a year is divided into 72 five day periods. The memoir consists of 72 vignettes, titled as chapters in lowercase letters, such as "chrysanthemums are tinged yellow".

The New York Times Book Review praised East Wind Melts the Ice, calling Dalby's writing style "eccentric", presenting unusual yet interesting material, weaving together experiences from Japan, China and northern California to create a "wealth of information". Dalby received praise from Booklist for the manner in which she uses a stream of consciousness style of writing, to create a work in which the Eastern concept of time is contrasted with the Western; her ability to see with an anthropologist's eye and yet to bring an imaginative and creative view to the book; and, in particular, to bring together the various places she has lived, from Kyoto, where she lived as the first Western woman to unofficially become a geisha in the 1970s, to northern California, where she currently lives.

=== Hidden Buddhas ===
Dalby's second novel, Hidden Buddhas: A Novel of Karma and Chaos, was published in 2009, in which she returns to writing fiction. In this book, set in modern day Japan, Paris, and California, she writes a story set against the backdrop of the concept of hibutsu (secret Buddha statues) in Japanese Buddhist temples.

== Books ==
- Geisha, University of California Press, 1st edition, 1983, ISBN 0-520-04742-7
- All Japan: The Catalogue of Everything Japanese, 1984, ISBN 0688025307
- Kimono: Fashioning Culture, Yale University Press, 1993, ISBN 0-300-05639-7
- The Tale of Murasaki, First Anchor Books, 2000, ISBN 0-385-49795-4
- East Wind Melts the Ice: A Memoir Through the Seasons, University of California Press, 2007, ISBN 0-520-25053-2
- Hidden Buddhas: A Novel of Karma and Chaos, Stone Bridge Press, 2009

== General sources ==
- Bardsley, Jan (2009). "Liza Dalby's Geisha: The View Twenty-five Years Later" (PDF). Southeast Review of Asian Studies. 31: 309–323. Archived from the original (PDF) on 3 March 2016.
