= Kanzashi =

Traditional Japanese hair ornaments

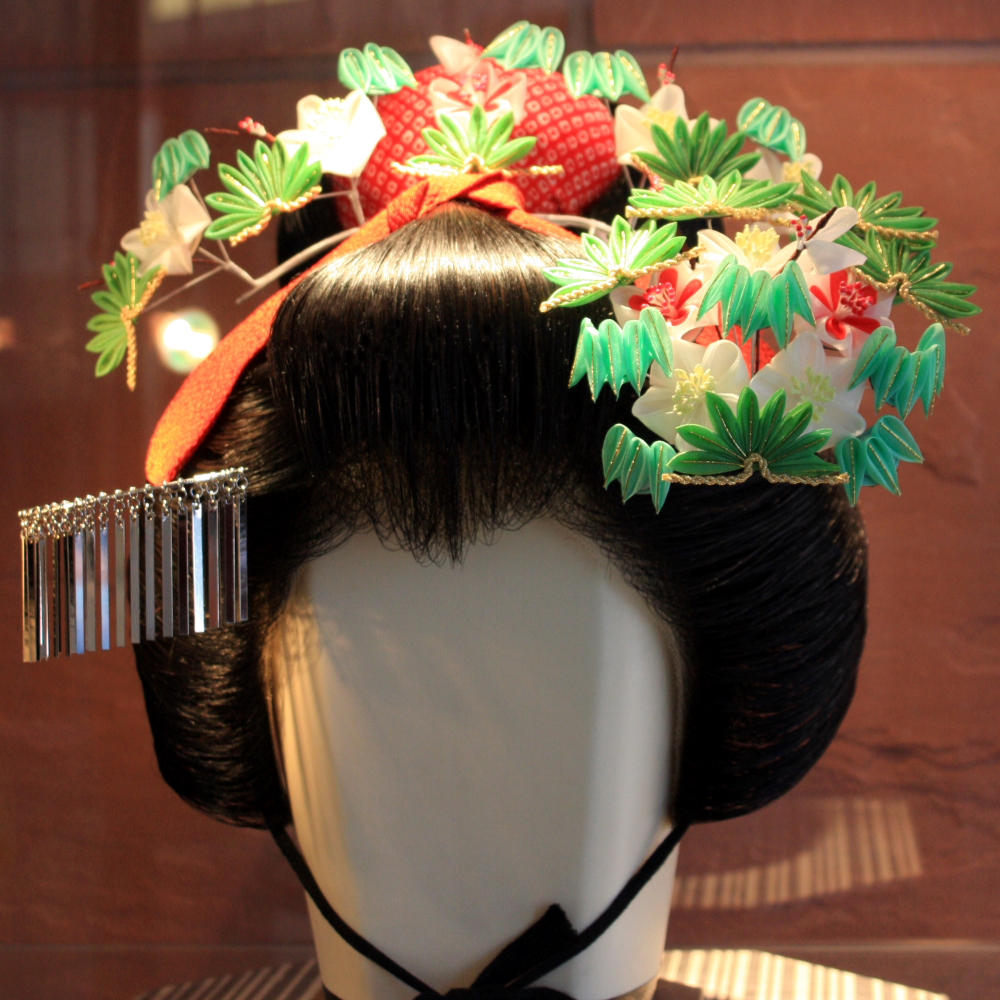
A modern tsumami kanzashi set of the type worn by maiko (apprentice geisha) for the month of January

Kanzashi (簪) are hair ornaments used in traditional Japanese hairstyles. The term kanzashi refers to a wide variety of accessories, including long, rigid hairpins, barrettes, fabric flowers and fabric hair ties.

In the English-speaking world, the term kanzashi is typically used to refer to hair ornaments made from layers of folded cloth used to form flowers (tsumami kanzashi), or the technique of folding used to make the flowers.

== History ==
Kanzashi were first used in Japan during the Jōmon period. During that time, the wearing of a single thin rod or stick was considered to hold powers to ward off evil spirits, with people wearing them in their hair for protective purposes. The Jōmon period also saw the introduction of hair combs.

During the Nara period, a variety of Chinese cultural aspects and items were brought to Japan through mutual trade and envoys. The items brought back from China included Chinese hairpins (zan, 簪; written with the same Chinese character as kanzashi), amongst other hair ornaments such as Chinese combs.

During the Heian period, hairstyles shifted from being worn up to being worn long, and tied back relatively low. During this time period, the term kanzashi began to be used as a general term for any hair ornament, including combs and hairpins.

During the Azuchi-Momoyama period, hairstyles changed from the taregami (垂髪, "hair hanging down") style, to the wider variety of styles worn up – predecessors of modern nihongami styles, which made more use of hair ornaments.

Kanzashi came into wider use during the Edo period, when hairstyles became larger and more complicated, using a larger number of ornaments. Artisans began to produce more finely crafted products, including some hair ornaments that could be used as defensive weapons. During the latter part of the Edo period, the craftsmanship of kanzashi is considered to have reached a high point, with a number of styles and designs created, many of which persist to the modern day.

=== Modern day ===
In the present day, traditional Japanese hairstyles are not commonly worn, typically being worn only by geisha, maiko, sumo wrestlers, brides, modern tayū and oiran re-enactors, with both geisha, brides, tayū and oiran, and some apprentice geisha in some regions of Japan, using pre-styled wigs instead of their own hair.

As such, few people wear kanzashi with traditional hairstyles. However, kanzashi can be, and still are, worn with everyday hairstyles as simple hair accessories; there are a number of varieties and styles of wearing kanzashi, with modern varieties worn as hairclips both common and popular. In 1982, tsumami kanzashi were officially designated as a traditional Japanese handcraft in the Tokyo region.

== Craftsmanship ==
Professional kanzashi craftspeople typically undergo a five- to 10-year traditional apprenticeship to learn the trade. Similarly to the combs used to create nihongami hairstyles, only a small number of traditionally-trained kanzashi craftspeople are left practising the trade within Japan; from 2002 to 2010, their estimated number in the country decreased from 15 to five.

However, the tsumami kanzashi technique of petal-folded fabric kanzashi has become a popular craft amongst hobbyists, with a number of books, kits and lessons available on the subject, from sources such as the Tsumami Kanzashi Museum in Shinjuku. Some hobbyists have bypassed the traditional apprenticeship system to establish themselves as independent artisans of tsumami kanzashi in Japan.

== Types ==
Kanzashi are fabricated from a wide range of materials, such as lacquered wood, gold and silver plated metal, tortoiseshell, silk, and recently, plastic. Early plastic kanzashi made out of materials such as bakelite are considered to be highly valued as collectables.

There are a number of basic kanzashi styles, with the wear of each typically and traditionally following seasonal arrangements; however, in the present day, the use of seasonal kanzashi is observed only by geisha, their apprentices, tayū, oiran re-enactors and in the costumes for kabuki plays. The use of kanzashi to finely indicate age and status is a tradition also only held by geisha and maiko.

For maiko, the size, shape, variety and number of kanzashi can indicate seniority and the stage of apprenticeship, used in tangent with a number of different hairstyles throughout the apprenticeship. Though geisha also wear seasonal kanzashi, this is typically confined to a change in the colour of tama kanzashi.

=== Basic styles ===
Despite seasonal and (in the instance of bridalwear) occasional variation, most kanzashi that are not considered to be tsumami kanzashi fall into one of a number of basic shapes and appearances.

Name	Photo	Description	Details
Bira-bira kanzashi (びらびら簪, "fluttering" or "dangling kanzashi")		Two-pronged kanzashi with a rounded plate at the tip. Metal strips are attached to its edge by small rings that move independently of the main hairpin.	Some bira-bira feature bells or long chains of additional silk flowers known as shidare, and most have a mon (crest) stamped on the flattened end.
Ōgi bira kanzashi (扇びら簪, "fluttering fan kanzashi", also known as "princess style")		Fan-shaped bira-bira, stamped with the mon of the wearer.	Ōgi bira are typically worn by maiko.
Kogai (笄, "sword")		Two-piece stick-shaped kanzashi featuring a design on each end, which tend to be wider than the centre. Kogai resemble sheathed swords, with one end being removable in order for it to be placed in the hairstyle.	Kogai are commonly made of tortoiseshell, lacquered wood, ceramics or metal, and are often sold as a set with an accompanying kushi comb.
Kushi (櫛)		Comb-shaped kanzashi, typically rounded or rectangular, and made of similar materials to kogai kanzashi.	Kushi may be inlaid with mother of pearl or gilded, with most of the design placed on the wide "handle" portion, though sometimes extending down into the teeth of the comb itself. Kushi are usually placed at the front of the bun in traditional Japanese hairstyles. They commonly come in matching sets with kogai.
Hanagushi (花櫛, "flower comb")		Kushi decorated with folded silk flowers (tsumami kanzashi).	Hanagushi are popular as an informal kanzashi variety.
Tama kanzashi (玉簪, "ball kanzashi")		Single-pronged hairpin style kanzashi decorated with a single coloured bead on the end.	Tama kanzashi are commonly made of semi-precious stones such as jade or coral, or may be made of shibori-dyed fabric. Traditionally, red tama kanzashi were worn in the winter months, and green tama kanzashi were worn in summer.
Hirauchi kanzashi (平打簪)		Two-pronged kanzashi with a rounded, flattened end, worn as a hairpin in the back of a traditional hairstyle.	Commonly made of wood, resin or metal, hirauchi are commonly decorated with lacquer, gilded, inlaid with precious metals, or – in the case of metal hirauchi – have a filigree-style carved design.
Kanoko (鹿の子, "fawn spots")		Brightly-coloured fabric ties, sometimes padded, made of unpressed kanoko shibori-dyed fabric. Kanoko are usually tied around portions of the bun at the back of a traditional hairstyle.	Kanoko are often pink or red. Non-shibori varieties using chirimen crepe are also seen.

=== Other styles ===
A number of other styles of kanzashi also exist, though these are typically only worn for specific, uncommon hairstyles, such as by maiko in certain geisha districts or by characters in some kabuki plays.

Name	Photo	Description	Details
Bonten (梵天)(Direct translation: Brahma)	Bonten seen on the right side of the bun in this katsuyama hairstyle	Large, silver wire flower hairpins, typically featuring a larger flower in the centre, worn either side of the mage (bun) on certain hairstyles.	Bonten kanzashi are typically only worn with the katsuyama (勝山) and fukiwa (吹輪) hairstyles.
Miokuri (見送り)		Strip-like metal hair ornaments seen at the back of some hairstyles, hanging down from the central bun.	Both maiko, tayū and oiran re-enactors wear miokuri, with the miokuri of courtesans being longer and curled up at the end. Miokuri are usually plain red or silver, though some may feature designs.
Tachibana kanzashi (橘簪)	Tachibana kanzashi seen on the right-hand side of this maiko's hairstyle	Small, hairpin style kanzashi intended to literally represent the ripe and unripened fruits of the tachibana orange tree. The leaves of tachibana kanzashi are usually silver, with the oranges themselves made of jade and coral. For maiko, the placement of the tachibana kanzashi indicates seniority.	
Chirimen tegara (金紗手柄), also known as chirimen tegarami or simply tegara	Chirimen tegara decorated with silver foil flowers	A triangular, folded piece of crepe fabric pinned into the back of certain hairstyles.	For maiko, the colour of the fabric indicates seniority.
Kanoko dome (鹿の子留め)		Short, heavily-decorated hairpins with a large, rounded decoration on the end.	Typically decorated with gold, silver, tortoiseshell, jade, coral and other semi-precious stones, kanoko dome are worn at the back of some hairstyles featuring a bun, with the kanoko dome placed in the bun's centre.
Maezashi (まえざし) – also known as bira dome	A small, circular green maezashi kanzashi seen here on the left-hand side of this maiko's hairstyle	Small hairpins with one small motif or decoration (such as a fan or flower) worn just above the ōgi bira, again typically only by maiko.	Maezashi are usually chosen by the wearer out of personal taste.

== Tsumami kanzashi ==
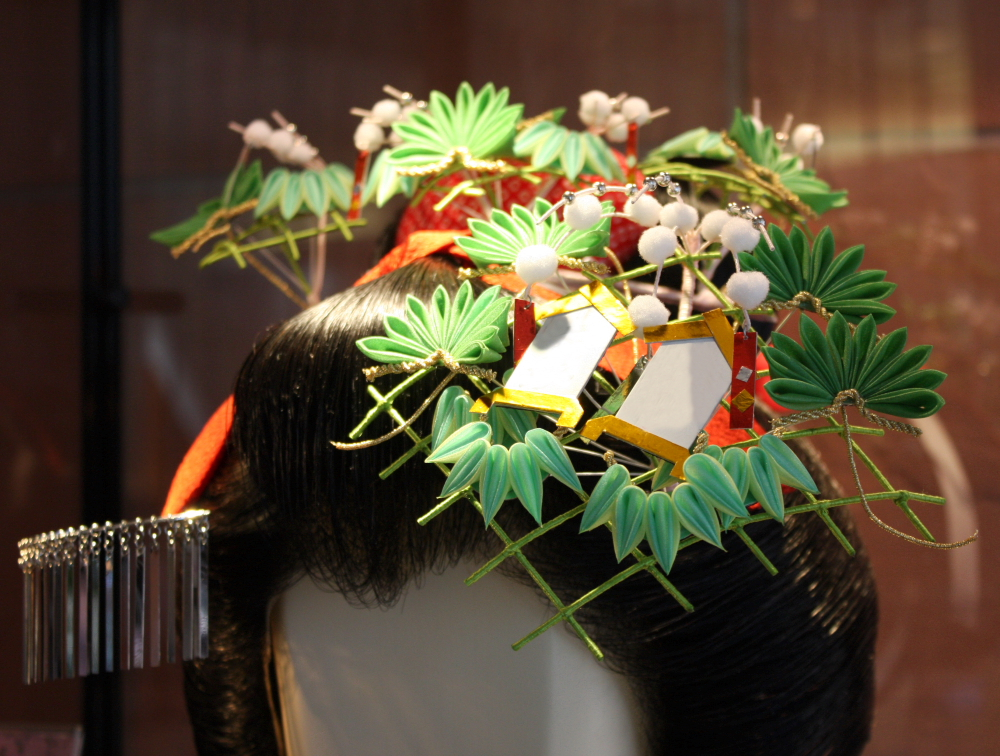
A December kanzashi featuring two blank maneki nameplates

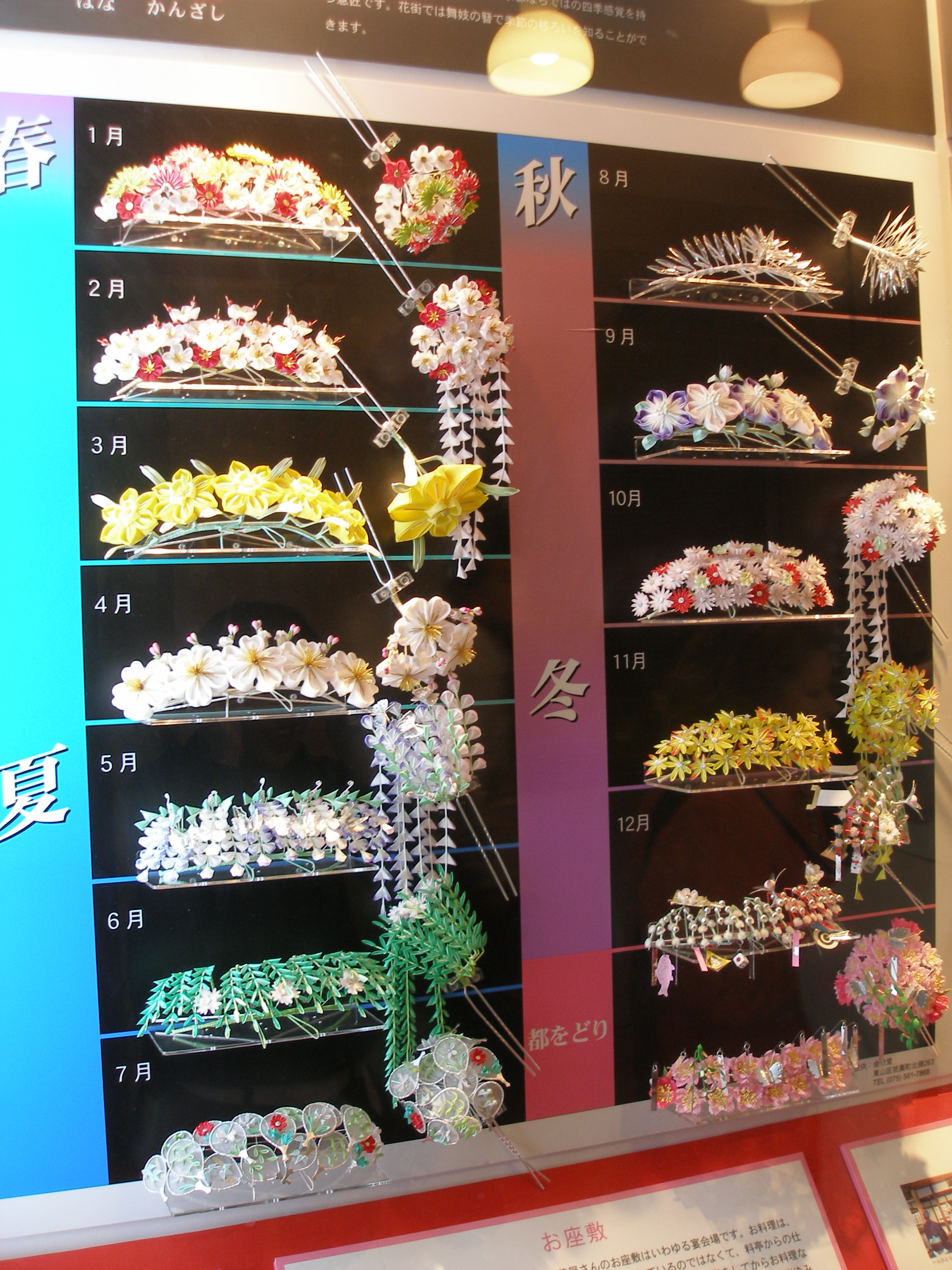
A display showing the seasonal hana kanzashi worn by maiko, from January to the New Year

Tsumami kanzashi – literally meaning "pinched kanzashi" – are traditional kanzashi made of squares of dyed or printed silk, folded into a number of shapes to represent flowers, plants and animals.

Each square is folded multiple times with the aid of tweezers and glued onto a base using rice glue. A finished tsumami kanzashi piece may contain anything from five to 75 squares of silk or more. Tsumami kanzashi pieces are intended to closely represent the plant or animal they depict; tsumami kanzashi depicting flowers are known as hana kanzashi (literally meaning "flower kanzashi").

Hana kanzashi are usually made from a cluster of tsumami kanzashi flowers, and may include bira-bira-style strips of metal or long streamers of petals dangling from the main kanzashi piece. Maiko are well-known for wearing hana kanzashi that are typically larger than average.

Generally, hana kanzashi are worn in pairs, one on either side of the head, often with a complementary kushi. The flowers are glued to backings of metal or cardboard that are attached to a wire and are bunched together to make bouquets and other arrangements. Additional detailing of stamens is created by the use of mizuhiki, a strong, thin twine made from washi paper, often coloured and used for decorative works.

Geisha, and especially maiko, wear different hana kanzashi for each month of the year.

=== Seasonal tsumami kanzashi motifs ===
Hana kanzashi are highly seasonal, though typically the only people in Japan who follow the seasons closely enough to register seasonal changes are geisha and their apprentices. Since maiko wear more elaborate kanzashi than their senior geisha, seasonal changes are even more important for them.

- January – The design of January kanzashi usually has an auspicious New Years' theme. Shōchikubai is a popular choice – a combination of pine (shō), bamboo (chiku) and plum blossoms (bai) in green, red and white. Other popular motifs are sparrows (suzume), spinning tops and battledore paddles (hagoita).
- February – Usually trailing deep pink or red plum blossoms, said to symbolise young love and the approach of spring. Another less common theme is the pinwheel and the flowerball (kusudama) that is worn for Setsubun.
- March – Trailing yellow and white rapeseed flowers (nanohana) and butterflies, as well as peach blossoms (momo), narcissus (suisen), camellia (tsubaki) and peonies (botan). A rare kanzashi featuring dolls that are used to celebrate the Hina Matsuri (Girl's Day Festival) can also be seen during this month.
- April – Trailing soft pink cherry blossoms (sakura) mixed with butterflies and bonbori lanterns, signalling the approach of summer. Cherry blossom viewing at this time of year is a major cultural event in Japan. Kanzashi consisting of a single silver (or sometimes gold) butterfly (cho) made of mizuhiki cord are common.
- May – Trailing purple wisteria (fuji) and flag irises (ayame), usually in blue or pink. Irises denote the height of spring while wisteria is a flower often associated with the Imperial Court (wisteria viewing parties have been celebrated by Japanese nobles since the Heian period).
- June – Trailing green willow (yanagi) leaves with carnations/pinks (nadeshiko), or less commonly hydrangea (ajisai) flowers. This month is the rainy season in Japan, and therefore willow (a water-loving tree) and blue hydrangeas are appropriate.
- July – Kanzashi featuring a display of fans (usually round uchiwa fans, but occasionally folding sensu fans) are featured. The fans refer to the Gion Festival which takes place at this time. The motifs featured on a maiko's fan kanzashi vary each year, in line with the festival. There are common themes such as dragonflies and lines denoting swirling water. Other kanzashi worn during July are fireworks kanzashi and dewdrops on grass (tsuyushiba).
- August – Large morning glory (asagao) or susuki grass. The susuki grass appears as a starburst of spines made of silvered paper. Senior maiko wear white-backed silver petals and junior maiko wear pink-backed silver petals.
- September – Japanese bellflower (kikyō). The purple tones are traditionally associated with autumn. Often these will be mixed with bush clover.
- October – Chrysanthemum (kiku). These are well loved in Japan and are a symbol of the Imperial Family. Senior maiko will wear one large flower while junior maiko will wear a cluster of small flowers. Typical colours include pink, white, red, yellow, and purple.
- November – Trailing autumnal leaves that are usually composed of the very popular Japanese maple. Maple viewing is the autumnal equivalent of cherry blossom viewing in Japan. Ginkgo and liquidambar leaves are also seen.
- December – The Japanese make mochi at this time of year, and often decorate trees with them to represent white flowers. It is thought to be good luck to wear kanzashi featuring mochibana, or rice-cake flowers. December kanzashi also feature two maneki, name plates used by kabuki actors, which are initially blank. Traditionally, maiko visit the Minamiza Theatre and ask two of their favourite kabuki actors to autograph them with their kabuki nom de plume. Kanzashi for senior maiko feature green bamboo leaves while junior maiko have a colourful assortment of lucky charms.
- New Year – At this time of year all maiko and geisha wear un-husked ears of rice in their hairstyles (maiko wear it on the right while geisha wear it on the left). These kanzashi also feature eyeless white doves. The maiko and geisha fill in one eye and ask somebody they like to draw the other for good luck in the coming year.

== See also ==
- Chinese hairpin
- Binyeo
- Comb
- Hair stick
- Hairpin
- Shubi – Chinese combs
