= Maiko =

Apprentice geisha in Kyoto and Western Japan

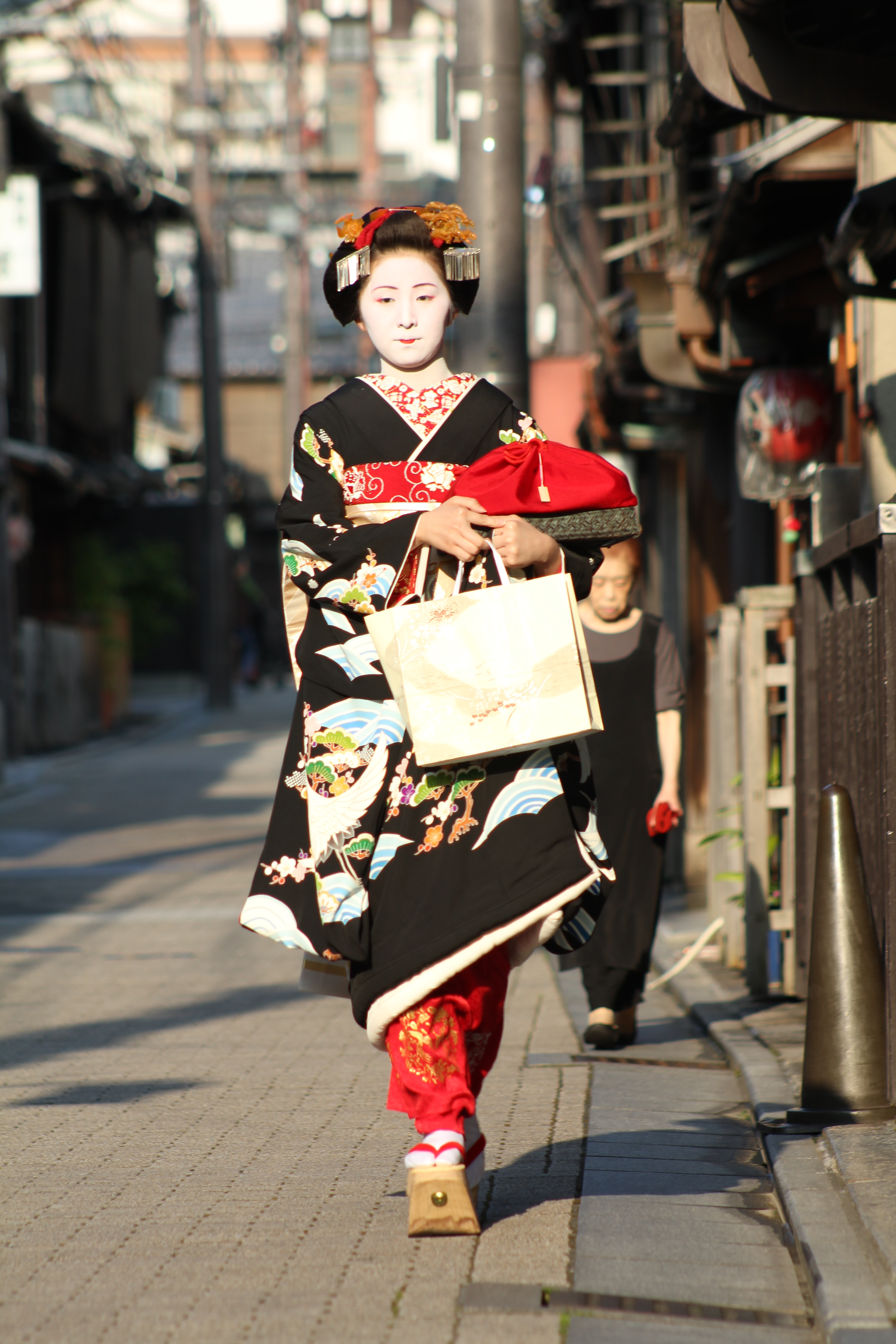
An apprentice geiko on the day of her misedashi, the occasion when a shikomi becomes an apprentice proper. Notice two dangling kanzashi on the sides of her hairstyle.

A maiko (舞妓; IPA: /ˈmaɪkoʊ/ MY-koh, Japanese: [maiko]) is an apprentice geisha (geiko in Kyoto). Their jobs consist of performing songs, dances, and playing the shamisen or other traditional Japanese instruments for visitors during banquets and parties, known as ozashiki.

Maiko are usually aged 15 to 20, and graduate to geiko status after a period of training that includes traditional dance, the shamisen, kouta (lit. 'short songs'), and, in Kyoto only, learning the Kyoto dialect. The apprenticeship ranges from a few months to a year or two years, although apprentices too old to dress as maiko may advance to geiko despite still training.

Apprentice geisha in other locations in Japan are known by other terms, such as hangyoku (半玉, lit. 'half jewel', referring to a term for a geisha's wages, 'jewel money') for apprentices in Tokyo. The traditions of apprentice geisha in these areas diverge from those in Kyoto, sometimes to a considerable degree, including an apprentice's appearance and the structure of her apprenticeship.

== Work ==
In the morning, maiko take lessons in the traditional arts. At night, they dance, sing, play the shamisen, and serve visitors at exclusive ochaya (teahouses).

== Origin ==
Maiko originated from women who served green tea and dango (Japanese dumpling made from rice flour) to visitors to the Kitano Tenman-gū or Yasaka Shrine in teahouses in Kyoto about 300 years ago.

== Appearance ==
=== Hair ===
During their career, maiko will wear different kinds of nihongami (traditional Japanese hairstyles) depending on rank, formality and occasion. These hairstyles are then decorated with seasonal and occasional kanzashi (traditional hair ornaments).

Most maiko, unlike geisha, use their own hair with the addition of extensions, though apprentices in different areas of Japan may also use wigs. Maiko using their own hair have their hair restyled every week, requiring them to sleep on a special pillow known as a takamakura – a raised wooden block with a pillow – in order to maintain it.

=== Kimono and outfit ===
==== Hikizuri ====
Most maiko wear a style of kimono known as a hikizuri (引きずり, lit. 'trailing skirt'). Hikizuri are typically anywhere from 200–240 centimetres (79–94 in) long, and often feature a lightly padded hem to create weight allowing the hem to trail along the floor. When walking outside, maiko hold their hikizuri up either with their hands, or by tying it in place with a small cord so that it does not drag along the ground. The style of hikizuri worn by most maiko features long, furisode-style sleeves, and may feature tucks sewn horizontally into the sleeves and vertically along the shoulders; this is a holdover from before WWII, when maiko often began their training at a young age, and would remove the tucks as they grew.

For formal occasions, maiko wear a black kurotomesode-style hikizuri featuring 5 crests (kamon) to signify the okiya they belong to.

==== Darari obi ====
Maiko wearing hikizuri kimono typically wear it with an obi known as a darari obi (だらり帯, lit. 'dangling obi'). The darari obi is 6–7 metres (20–23 ft) long, is roughly 30 centimetres (12 in) wide, and is worn exclusively by maiko. Due to its length and weight, a male dresser (known as an otokoshi) is needed to tie it; otokoshi can dress a maiko in as little as five minutes, and may dress a number of maiko each night. The crest of a maiko's okiya is either dyed, embroidered or woven onto the end of the obi, below the kaikiri (end lines). For formal occasions, gold brocade darari obi are worn.

==== Kimono ====
Some maiko outside of Kyoto, and in particular in Tokyo, wear furisode instead of hikizuri. These apprentices (sometimes known as hangyoku) may also wear a wig instead of having their own hair styled.

==== Obi ====
Maiko outside Kyoto may also wear a fukuro obi, which is easier to tie and wear than a darari obi. Apprentices in Tokyo typically tie their obi in the fukura suzume style.

== Contemporary controversies ==
In recent years, allegations have emerged regarding the working conditions of maiko in Kyoto's hanamachi districts, particularly concerning underage apprentices. Former maiko Kiyoha Kiritaka has reported forced alcohol consumption, coercion in mixed bathing with customers (ofuro-iri), and other forms of harassment.

== In media ==
- The Makanai: Cooking for the Maiko House, Japanese live-action television series on Netflix premiered 12 January 2023.

== Gallery ==
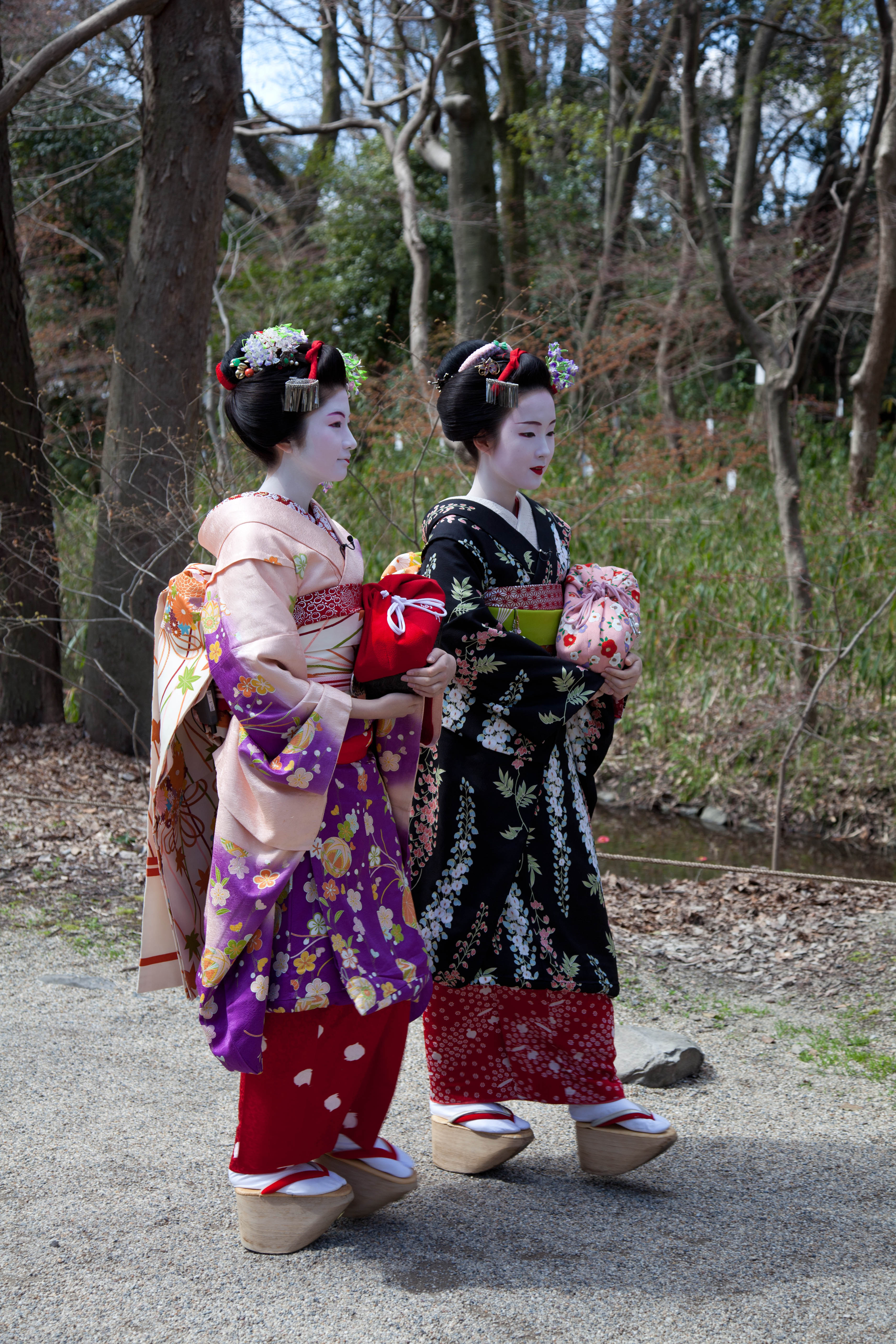
Two Kyoto maiko walking

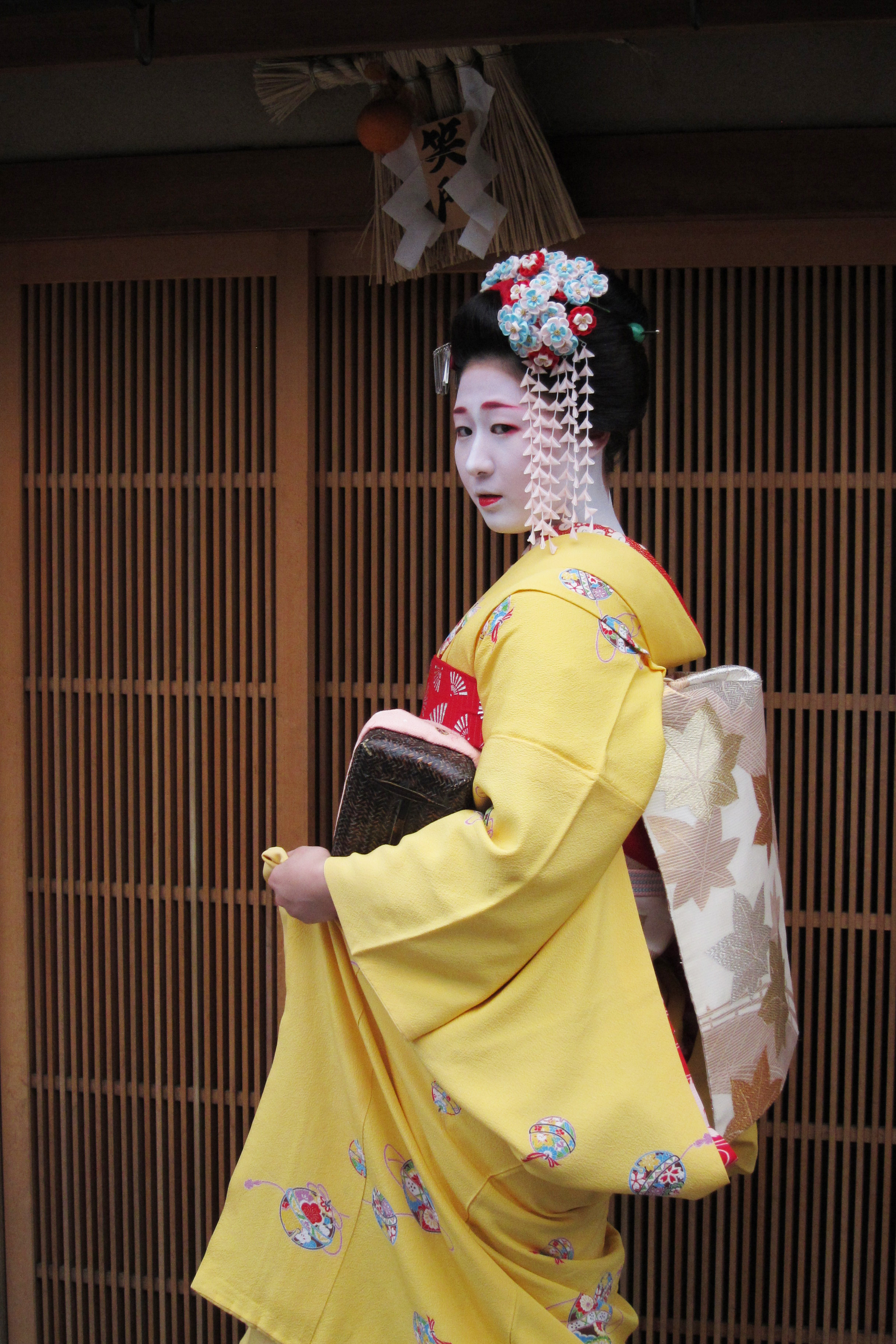
Maiko wearing shidare kanzashi, composed by long chains of silk flowers

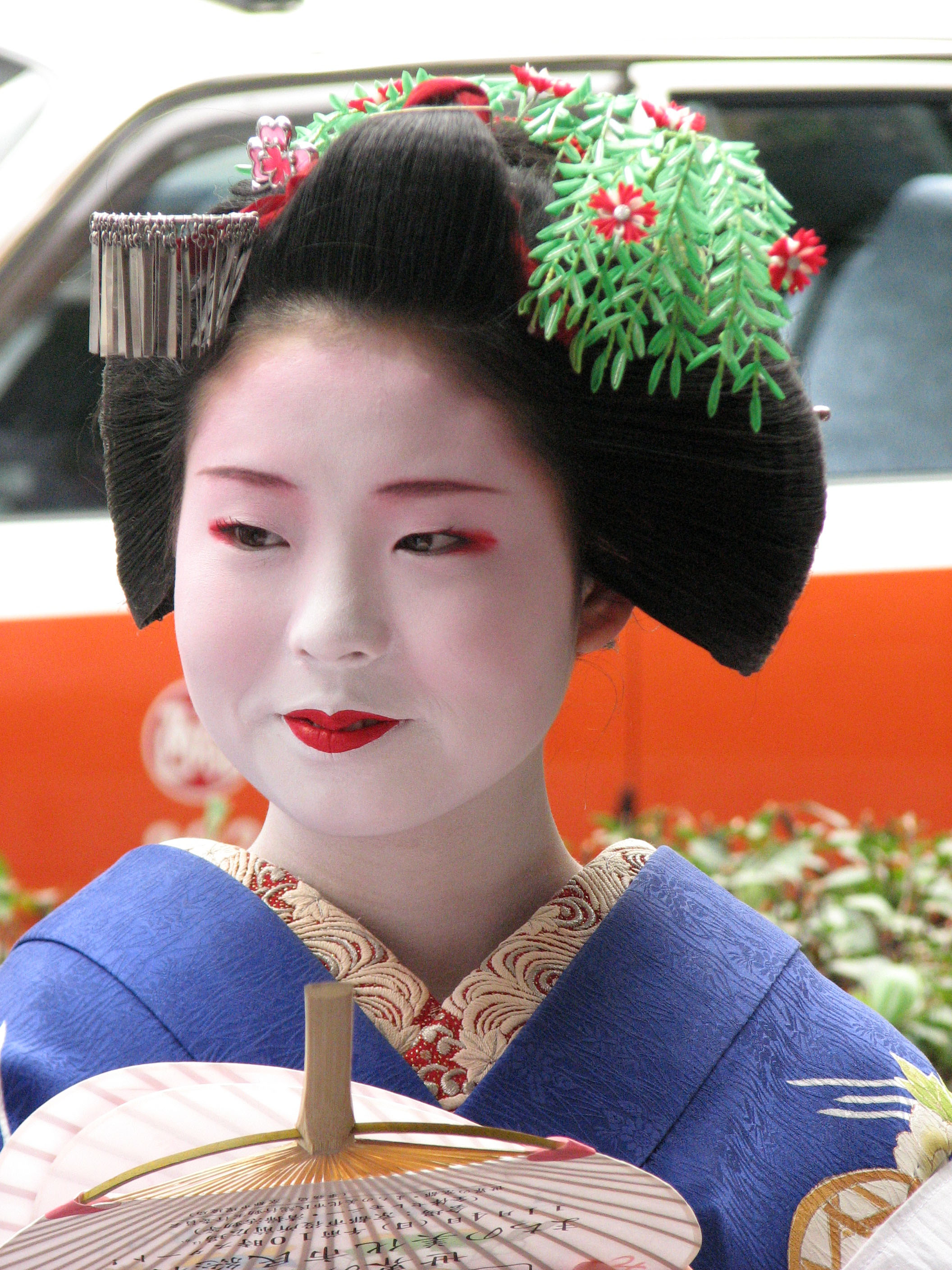
Maiko with willow kanzashi

(video) A maiko dancing
