= Nihongami =

Traditional Japanese hairstyles

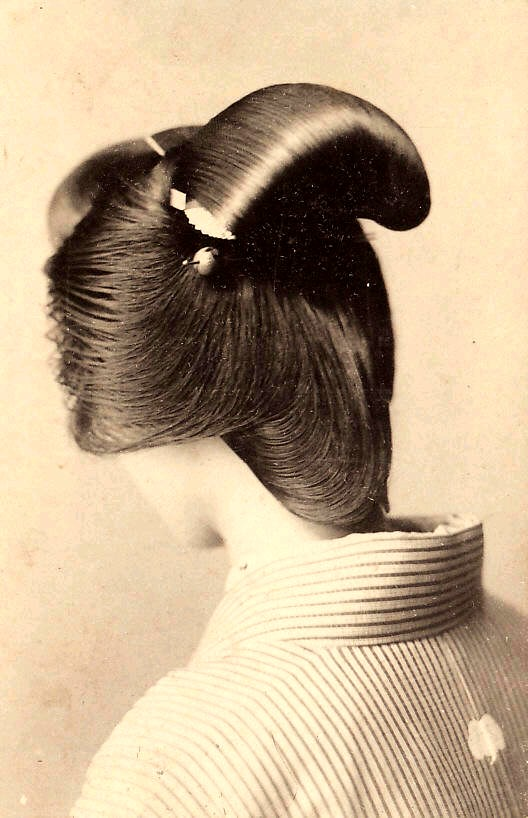
Back view of the marumage (丸髷) hairstyle

Nihongami (日本髪; Japanese pronunciation: [ɲ̟ì.hó̞ŋ́.ɡä́.mʲí, -ŋä́-] lit. 'Japanese hair') is the term used for a number of traditional Japanese hairstyles considered to be distinctive in their construction and societal role.

Traditionally, the construction of most nihongami hairstyles consisted of two "wings" at the side of the head, curving upwards towards the back of the head to form a topknot or ponytail, with a long loop of hair below this also drawn into the topknot. Styles were accessorised with traditional hair accessories, though typically only by women; the combination of both style and accessories formed hairstyles that distinctively varied based on gender, age, job role and social standing.

Most styles of nihongami were hardened and shaped with wax, known as abura, and were styled with specially carved combs made of either bamboo or boxwood, with heated tongs used to straighten the hair before styling. Hair styled in this manner was typically restyled weekly, and in some cases would necessitate sleeping on a pillow raised from the floor, known as a takamakura.

Nihongami are no longer commonly worn, and today are most often seen on maiko, geisha and sumo wrestlers. A number of different styles of nihongami are also worn by courtesan re-enactors and modern tayū, and many styles once common in the Edo period are seen faithfully reproduced in kabuki plays, which themselves also commonly date to the Edo period. Though some styles of nihongami are well documented, others have, over time, fallen into obscurity, with little in the way of documentation in regards to their appearance, name, origin and method of styling.

== History ==
Antique nihongami katsura (wig) in a display case

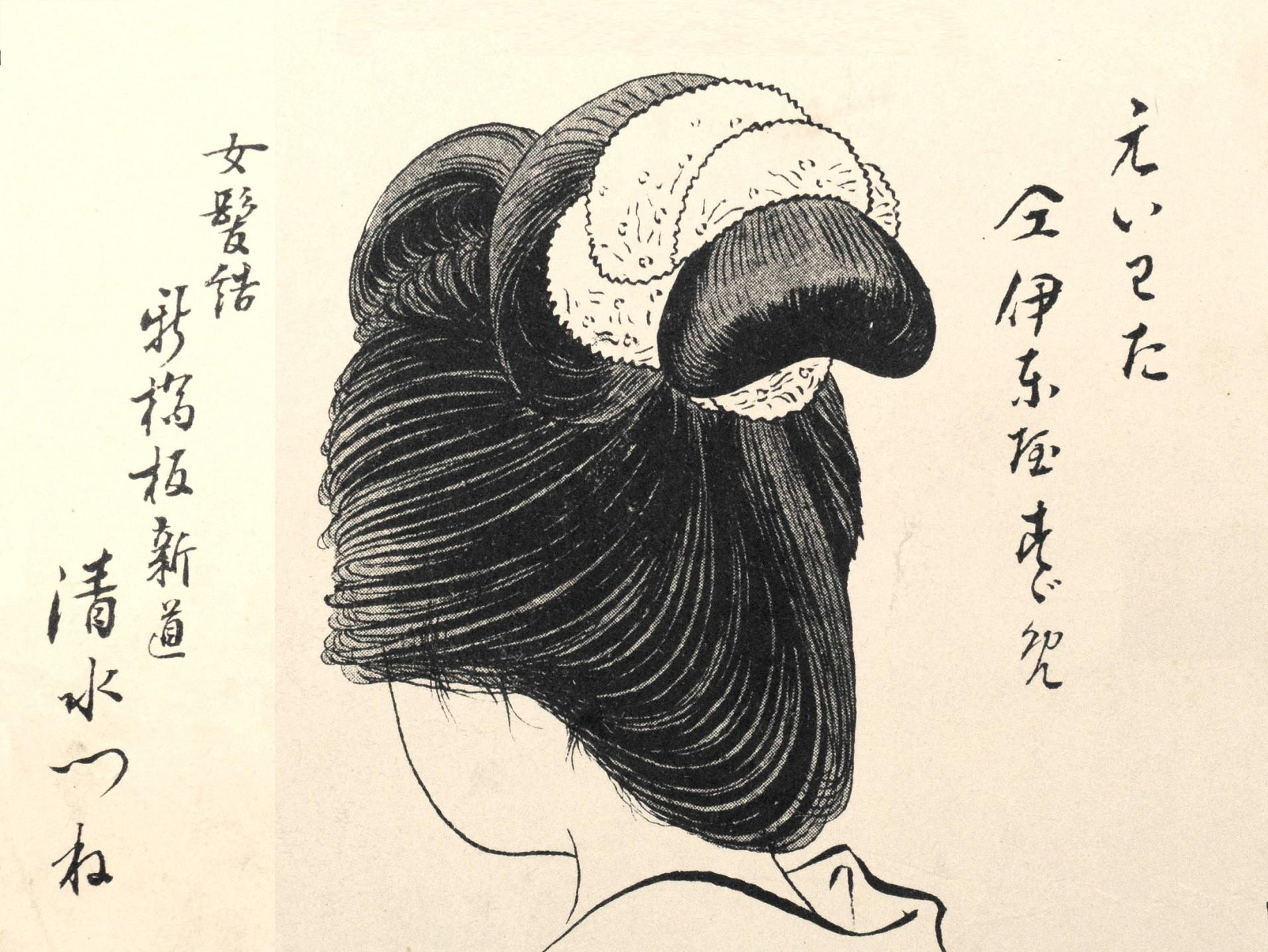
The yuiwata hairstyle

The noblewomen of the early 7th century would wear their hair "very high and boxy at the front, with a sickle-shaped ponytail at the back, sometimes called 'hair bound with a red string'" They would call this hairstyle keppatsu (結髪) because it was inspired by the Chinese fashion of the era. Keppatsu served to make the hairline look artificially retracted.

The noblewomen of Japan started to abandon Chinese fashions and create their own style of sense and practicality. This occurred around 794 and lasted until about 1345, during Heian period. The style at this time was to wear long, loose, straight hair called suberakashi (垂れ髪). The 11th-century novel The Tale of Genji (源氏物語, Genji monogatari) describes women showing off their long, flowing hair.

Many hairstyles now labelled nihongami were developed during the Edo period, when a preference amongst women for long, flowing hairstyles transitioned towards more elaborate, upswept styles, featuring buns at the back of the neck and 'wings' at either side of the head. This trend, originating amongst courtesans and kabuki actors, soon spread to fashionable merchants' wives, before becoming a general fashion trend seen throughout Japan.

During this time, a number of widely-varying hairstyles were developed and worn by Japanese women, with hairstyles commonly worn based on age, social class and occupation. One such hairstyle that developed during the Edo period was the shimada, which was commonly worn by girls in their late teenage years. The shimada became the basis for a number of popular hairstyles, such as the tōrōbin shimada (lit. 'lantern shimada'), which developed in the mid-Edo period; featuring wide wings at the side of the head, its name was said to refer to the fact that the area behind a person could be seen through the wings of a hairstyle, akin to being able to see through a tōrō lantern. The tōrōbin shimada experienced wide popularity, and was commonly depicted in ukiyo-e prints by artists such as Utamaro.

Other hairstyles, such as sakkō (先笄), momoware and the yuiwata were also worn by young women; the momoware hairstyle was typically worn by girls during the Edo period, with sakkō being worn by newly married women during the later Edo period and Meiji period.

Historically, traditional hairstylists, known as keppatsu-shi, were almost entirely women, a trend which continued up until the 1970s, when the last hairstylist servicing the tayū in Kyoto died, leading to hairstylist Tetsuo Ishihara taking the role. The boxwood and bamboo combs used to create the hairstyles were, and continue to be, handmade by craftspeople; however, though as many as 200 craftspeople made combs near Osaka in the mid-19th century, few craftspeople exist to produce traditional combs in the modern day.

During and after WWII, wigs (known as katsura) being worn by geisha; this allowed geisha to go weeks without needing to restyle their hair, over the once or twice weekly required when not wearing a wig. The hairstyles worn by maiko also changed following WWII, though maiko continued to mostly use their own hair instead of a wig. Previously, maiko had worn hairstyles relatively similar to the shimada style worn by geisha, with each section of the hairstyle appearing longer and less voluminous in style. In the postwar period, the number of hairstylists with the knowledge to create this hairstyle dwindled significantly enough that the hairstyles of maiko were redeveloped.

In the present day, there are still relatively few traditional hairstylists, with just five in 2004 in Kyoto servicing the entirety of the geisha and tayū communities.

== Styling ==
Though a number of different hairstyles exist, most nihongami styles follow a relatively similar construction method. Knowledge of the styling methods for as many as 115 different styles of nihongami survives to the present day.

The hair is first divided into five sections:

1. The front 'bangs' (in British English 'fringe') section maegami (前髪)
2. The two side wings, or bin (鬢)
3. The bun/topknot section, called the mage (髷)
4. The nape section, which forms a long loop of hair underneath the topknot, called the tabo (髱)

Each section is styled towards the mage at the top of the head; variations in the volume and shape can denote a different hairstyle entirely. The hair is then styled using traditional boxwood or bamboo combs (known as tsuge gushi and togushi respectively), and is kept in place with the addition of wax, the thickness of which varies based on factors such as weather and humidity. Parts of the hairstyle are supported by the addition of waxed hair extensions, typically yak hair, before being secured with wire cords known as mottoi and kept in place with hair accessories and combs. Separate hair combs, featuring small, short teeth, are used to gently touch up the hairstyle once styled, keeping it free from dirt and dust.

== Geisha ==
Post-WWII, geisha began to wear wigs (known as katsura) instead of styling their own hair, a trend which continues to this day. Geisha generally wear shimada-style wigs known as geigi shimada (芸妓島田), geiko shimada (芸子島田) or chū takashimada (中高島田). This style is distinguishable from the shimada that brides wear by its generally flatter and thinner appearance; the bin are smaller and less rounded, the mage is placed further back on the head, and the tabo is longer and thinner; the maegami is also typically not as full. Geisha katsura are styled to suit each individual's face, meaning that no two geisha katsura appear alike, whereas bridal shimada are typically rented and pre-styled, leading to less variation than is seen in the katsura geisha wear.

The style of shimada worn by older geisha to special events is known as the tsubushi shimada (潰し島田, lit. 'smashed shimada'). This style of shimada, worn by older women in previous centuries, is the flattest form of the shimada, with the mage pushed relatively far back off the head, appearing somewhat squashed with the usually-open loop of the mage crushed to form two smaller, tighter loops of hair.

== Brides ==
For traditional Japanese weddings, a style of shimada known as the takashimada (高島田) or bunkin takashimada (文金高島田) is worn by the bride, which appears extremely similar to the shimada worn by geisha.

The takashimada worn by brides is typically a pre-styled wig hired for the day, featuring full, rounded bin, a mage set relatively high on the head, a fuller maegami and a shorter, fuller tabo at the back. This is usually worn with a set of matching hair accessories, which can be gold, silver, tortoiseshell or faux-tortoiseshell.

== Maiko ==
Maiko wear a number of different hairstyles throughout their apprenticeship to become geisha, many of which vary by region and individual geisha district. The hair accessories worn by maiko vary by season and occasion, and are considerably larger than most kanzashi worn by women. Some nihongami are particular to a certain district or event; for instance, maiko from Gion Kobu wear a special hairstyle for the Miyako Odori.

Typically, the average maiko will go through five changes in hairstyle throughout their apprenticeship. These are:

- Katsuyama (勝山) – the hairstyle worn by every senior maiko during the Gion Matsuri. The mage resembles the yakko shimada in both shape and construction, featuring the same kanoko in either red, pink or blue (for very senior maiko) tied under the mage. On either side of the mage, bon-ten (silver flower kanzashi) are placed in the gap formed by the mage itself. It is said that this hairstyle was created using the oiran katsuyama hairstyle from the Edo period.
- Ofuku (おふく) – the default hairstyle for senior maiko. Like momoware, ofuku also appears similar to wareshinobu, however, instead of a bun split into two equally sized wings, the mage is left unsplit, with a tegara (triangle of typically shibori-dyed silk) pinned to the outside, forming a triangle of silk from the base of the mage that is pinned to the centre. As maiko graduate in seniority, the colour of the tegara changes from red, then to pink, and then finally different colours.
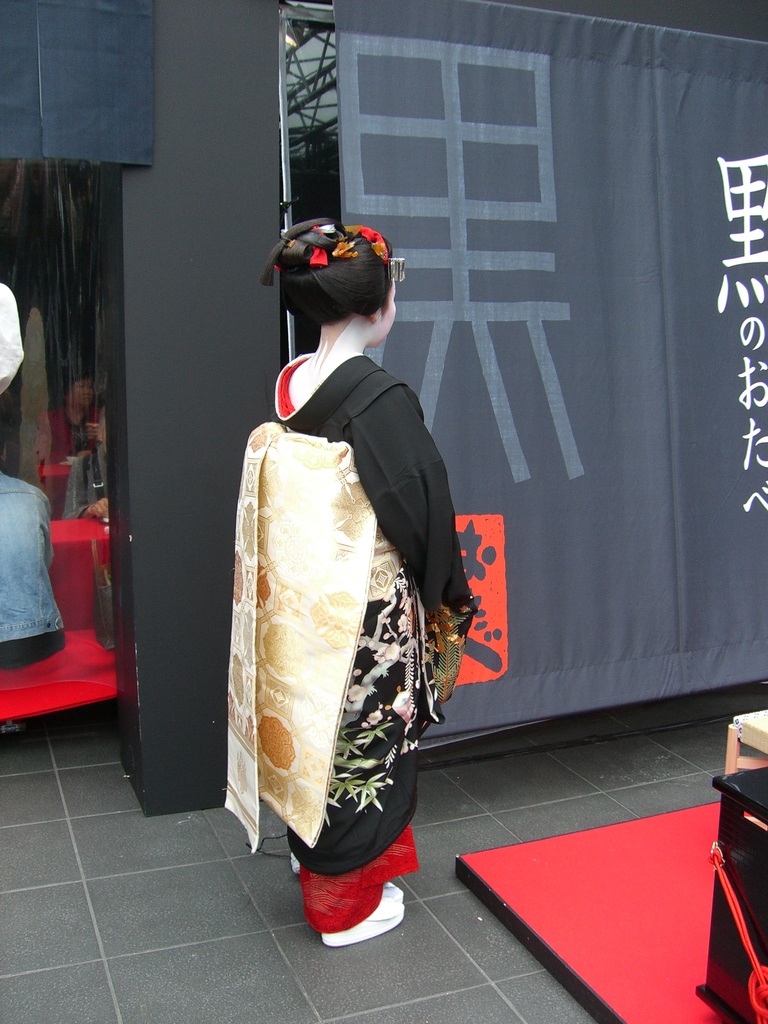
  A maiko with the sakkō hairstyle
- Sakkō (先笄) – the last hairstyle worn by maiko before graduating to the rank of geisha. Sakkō is worn for two weeks before graduation (known as erikae). It is the most elaborate and expensive of maiko hairstyles, decorated with formal tortoiseshell kanzashi, and a unique sakkō kanzashi designed by the maiko herself, featuring auspicious animals such as cranes and tortoises. The mage is tied in a complex manner, and features a hanging strip of waxed hair; the night before a maiko's erikae, the proprietress of the okiya and the maiko and geisha of the house cuts the strip of hair and the ties holding the hairstyle together. It was also worn in the latter Edo period (1603–1867) and in the Meiji period (1868–1912) by young married women.
- Wareshinobu (割れしのぶ) – the hairstyle worn by junior maiko for the first 2–3 years of their apprenticeship. The wareshinobu appears structurally similar to the momoware hairstyle, with the wareshinobu hairstyle featuring a flatter mage, bin that taper towards the bottom, a smaller, chunkier tabo and a maegami that lies further towards the back of the head in its fullness.

The mage is formed by shaping a typical shimada-style mage, before being split into two wings with a long strip of waxed hair. A kanoko dome hair ornament is placed in the middle of the wings, before two padded rolls of shibori-dyed red silk – known as a kanoko – are inserted at the top and bottom, giving the appearance of a doughnut-shaped red ring with two wings of hair on either side. The wareshinobu is worn for a maiko's formal debut, known as misedashi, where it is also decorated with formal kanzashi made of tortoiseshell, silver and red miokuri (dangling silver strips placed underneath the mage), and two bira bira ("fluttering" or "dangling") kanzashi.

- Yakko shimada (奴島田) – the hairstyle worn by senior maiko for Shigyoshiki (the start of the new year), Hassaku (summer Thanksgiving in Gion Kobu only), and for performing tea ceremony at odori (dances). The yakko shimada is constructed similarly to the basic shimada style, with a two-part mage at the back, identifiable for this style by the string of beads wrapped around its centre and the single-bead kanzashi placed in the middle of this string, known collectively as the hatsuyori. In winter, the hatsuyori is typically coral with a single jade bead kanzashi, and in summer, the colours reverse to be mainly jade with a single coral bead. The yakko shimada also features a long, padded tube of silk (a kanoko) tied through and underneath the mage, usually in red silk, though it can be a number of colours.

== Oiran and tayū ==
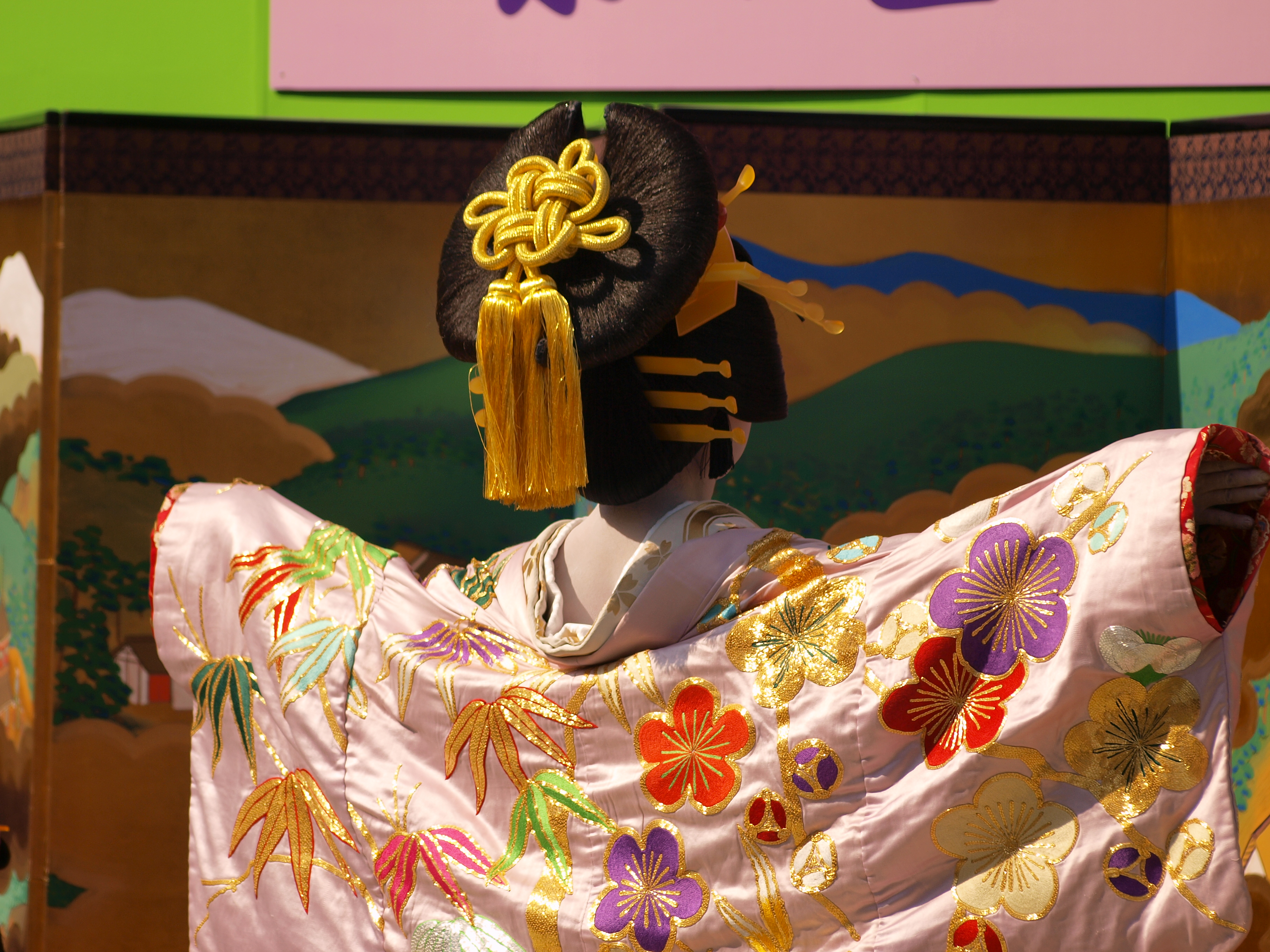
An oiran re-enactor wearing the date hyōgo hairstyle

Historically, oiran (all high-class courtesans) and tayū (the highest rank of entertainers) wore a number of different, typically elaborate and heavily dressed styles of nihongami. These included, but were not limited to:

- Kinshōjo, which incorporated elements of the katsuyama and ofuku hairstyles in the maegami and mage respectively
- Mitsumage, an informal style worn by lower-ranking courtesans, and not seen on townswomen or samurai women in the Edo period as in some hairstyles
- Nageshimada, a type of shimada appearing similar to the yugao with a simply formed mage and accessorised with a smaller, colourful cord tied around it; historical versions of the nageshimada appear to show a more elongated tabo and more prominently looped mage
- Onna Genroku and Otoko Genroku, both featuring prominent and intricately styled mage
- Tayū sakkō, similar to the sakkō worn by senior maiko and differing in the longer, looser tabo and in the style of kanoko used
- Yugao, named after one of the heroines in the Tale of Genji, featuring wide bin and a gold cord wrapped around the intricately styled mage

Other styles worn by tayū had less-elaborate counterparts commonly worn by townswomen, maiko and women of the samurai class. These included:

- Kansuzuma
- Ohatsu
- Oshidori
- Osome
- Tachibana
- Tachibana kuzushi
- Tsubushi shimada
- Wareshinobu

== Other nihongami ==
Other Japanese hairstyles include:

- Bunkin shimada
- Kikugasane
- Mae ware
- Oshidori no hina
- Oshiyun

== See also ==
- Hime cut
- List of hairstyles
