= Miyako Odori =

Annual classical Japanese dance performance in Kyoto

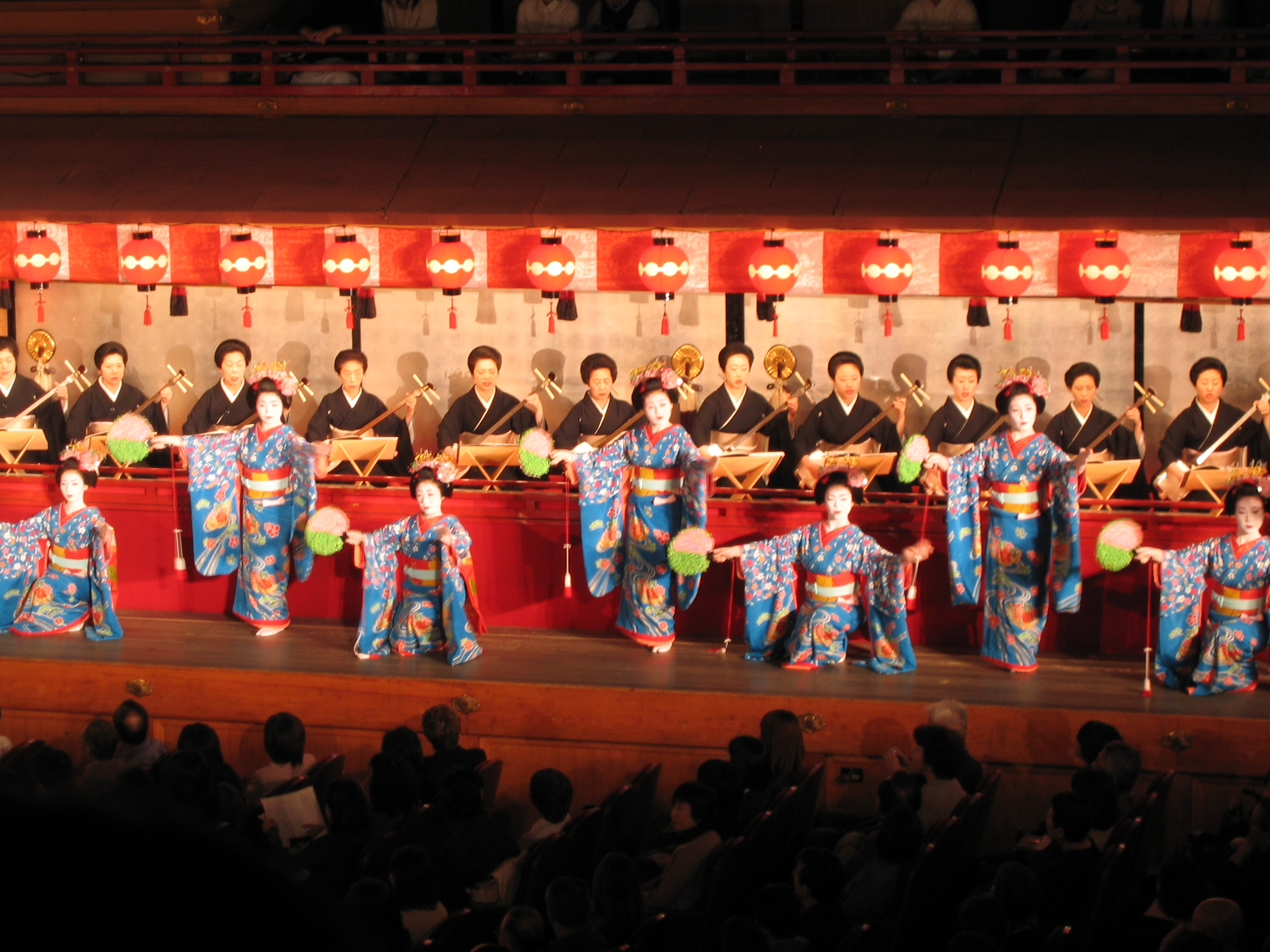
Miyako Odori

The Miyako Odori (都をどり) is one of the four great spring shows in the five geisha districts (hanamachi) of Kyoto, Japan.

== Festival performances ==
The Miyako Odori takes place four times a day from 1 to 30 April at the Gion Kōbu Kaburen-jo theatre near the Yasaka Shrine.

The dances, songs, and theater productions presented in the framework of the Miyako Odori are performed by the maiko (apprentice geisha) and geisha of the Gion quarter. The motifs draw from classical Japanese culture and incorporate everyday life as well as folkloristic elements, for example from the Tale of Genji.

A dance in the Miyako Odori may involve 32 maiko and geisha and 20 musicians in identical costumes, often performing in unison. Unlike the Kamogawa Odori, which presents a new programme yearly, the performance of the Miyako Odori is much the same year after year.

== History ==
The Miyako Odori was first celebrated in 1875, as part of a drive by the mayor of Kyoto to draw tourists to the area and revive the city's reputation following the Imperial court's move to Tokyo six years earlier. It was held alongside the Kamogawa Odori of Pontochō and the Kitano Odori of Kamishichiken. The Miyako Odori is part of the heart of cultural life in Kyoto and attracts many visitors.
