= Memoirs of a Geisha =

1997 novel by Arthur Golden

- First edition
- Author: Arthur Golden
- Language: English
- Genre: Historical fiction novel
- Publisher: Alfred A. Knopf
- Publication date: September 27, 1997
- Publication place: United States
- Media type: Print (hardback & paperback)
- Pages: 448 pp
- ISBN: 0-375-40011-7
- OCLC: 37689141
- Dewey Decimal: 813/.54 21
- LC Class: PS3557.O35926 M45 1997

Memoirs of a Geisha is a historical fiction novel by American author Arthur Golden, published in 1997. The novel, told in first person perspective, tells the story of Nitta Sayuri and the many trials she faces on the path to becoming and working as a geisha in Gion, Japan, before, during and after World War II.

In 2005, a film adaptation was released, directed by Rob Marshall and starring Zhang Ziyi in the lead role.

== Plot summary ==
In 1929, nine-year-old Sakamoto Chiyo and her sister are sold by their father to work within the entertainment districts of Kyoto. They are taken from their home in a coastal fishing village known as Yoroido and travel to Kyoto by train. Chiyo is taken to the Nitta okiya (geisha boarding house) in Gion to become a geisha, but her sister is taken to a brothel within Kyoto's pleasure district.

Chiyo is introduced to Auntie, Mother, and Granny. Both Auntie and Mother are strict, though Auntie is kinder to Chiyo, whereas Mother is driven by money and business. Chiyo is also introduced to Hatsumomo, the premier geisha of the okiya, its primary earner, and one of the most famous geisha of Gion, and Pumpkin, another maid at the okiya. Hatsumomo dislikes Chiyo and goes out of her way to torment her. When Chiyo fails an attempt to run away with her sister, Mother refuses to continue investing in Chiyo's future as a geisha.

A few years later, Chiyo is given money and a handkerchief in the street by a kind stranger known to Chiyo as the Chairman. Soon afterwards, Pumpkin prepares to make her debut as a maiko and the "younger sister" of Hatsumomo, whilst Chiyo remains a maid. Mameha, another famous geisha in Gion, persuades a reluctant Mother to reinvest in Chiyo's training, with Mameha acting as Chiyo's mentor and "older sister".

Chiyo becomes an apprentice geisha with the given name of Sayuri, and is reacquainted with Chairman Iwamura, his closest friend and business partner Nobu, and a number of other prominent men. As Sayuri gains popularity, Hatsumomo tries to hurt Sayuri's reputation and career in the hopes of Mother adopting Pumpkin as her heir instead.

Mameha orchestrates a bidding war for Sayuri's mizuage and uses the record-breaking payment for Sayuri's mizuage to cover all of her debts. Mother adopts Sayuri, and Hatsumomo begins a downward spiral into alcoholism before being thrown out of the okiya.

In 1944, geisha districts are ordered to close due to the ongoing war, and Sayuri desperately asks Nobu for help to avoid being conscripted into factory work. He sends Sayuri far north to live with his old friend, Arashino, where she stays for much of the war.

At the end of the war, Nobu visits Sayuri, asking that she return to Gion. Sayuri finds Pumpkin working in a new okiya; despite hoping to rekindle their friendship, Pumpkin later sabotages Sayuri's plan to scare Nobu off from proposing to be her danna, as revenge for taking her place in the adoption so many years ago.

A few days after her plan fails, Sayuri is summoned to meet the Chairman at a teahouse. She confesses that she has worked for years to become close to the Chairman. The Chairman admits that he has always known she was the girl he met on the street, and confesses his feelings for her as well, but felt he owed Nobu – his oldest and closest friend – the chance to be with Sayuri out of kindness. He also admits to having asked Mameha to train Sayuri.

Sayuri peacefully retires from geisha work when the Chairman becomes her danna. Sayuri relocates to New York City and opens her own small tea house for entertaining Japanese men on business in the United States. The Chairman remains her danna until his death.

== References to actual locations ==
Much of the novel is set in the popular geisha district of Gion in Kyoto, and contains references to actual places frequented by geisha and their patrons, such as the Ichiriki Ochaya. Part of the story is also set in the Amami Islands, and Sayuri narrates the story from her suite in the Waldorf towers in New York City.

== Lawsuit ==
After the Japanese edition of the novel was published, Arthur Golden was sued for breach of contract and defamation of character by Mineko Iwasaki, a retired geisha he had interviewed for background information while writing the novel. The plaintiff asserted that Golden had agreed to protect her anonymity if she told him about her life as a geisha, due to the traditional code of silence about their clients. However, Golden listed Iwasaki as a source in his acknowledgments for the novel, causing her to face a serious backlash, to the point of death threats. In his defense, Golden countered that he had tapes of his conversations with Iwasaki. Eventually, in 2003, Golden's publisher settled with Iwasaki out of court for an undisclosed sum of money.

Iwasaki later went on to write an autobiography, published as Geisha, a Life in the US and Geisha of Gion in the UK. In it, Iwasaki shows a very different picture of 20th-century geisha life from the one shown in Golden's novel. However, Iwasaki was born in the post-World War II era, while most of Golden's novel takes place before the war. Many cultural changes took place in Japan in the aftermath of the war, including legislation against prostitution.

== Film version ==
In 2005, film director Rob Marshall made a film version of the novel. It stars two Chinese actresses, Zhang Ziyi as Sayuri and Gong Li as Hatsumomo; Malaysian actress Michelle Yeoh as Mameha; and four Japanese actors, Ken Watanabe as the Chairman, Koji Yakusho as Nobu, Suzuka Ohgo as Sayuri's childhood incarnation Chiyo, and Youki Kudoh as the adult Pumpkin.

Filming was primarily done in California, and in some locations in Kyoto, including Kiyomizu-dera and Fushimi Inari-taisha. The film was released on December 2005 to mixed reviews and grossed $162 million worldwide. It was nominated for and won numerous awards, including nominations for six Academy Awards, winning three: Best Cinematography, Best Art Direction, and Best Costume Design.

== See also ==
- Geisha
- Oiran
- Orientalism
- Shirabyoshi
