= Gion =

Geisha district in Kyoto, Japan

Coordinates: 35.003496°N 135.775051°E

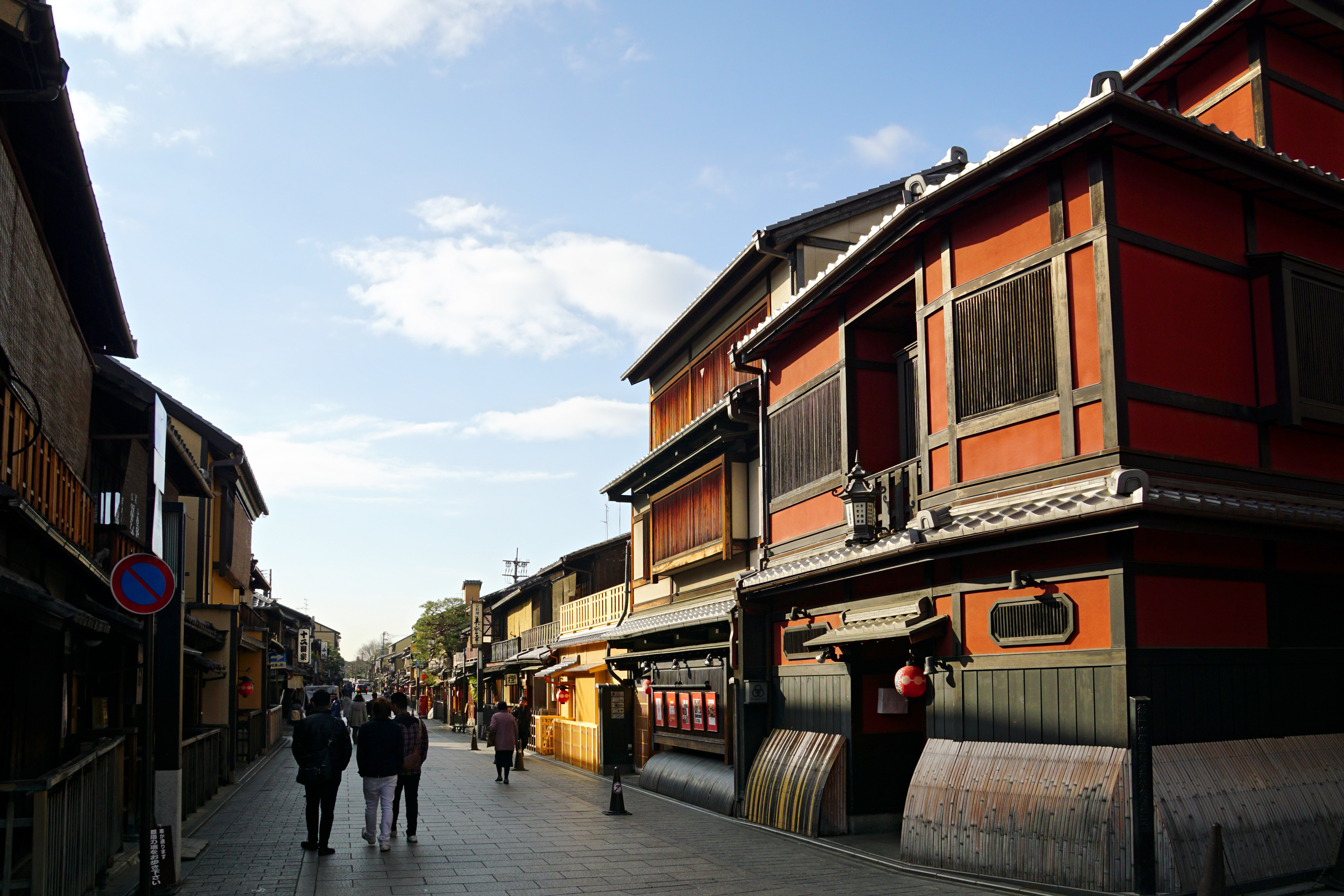
Hanamikōji Street

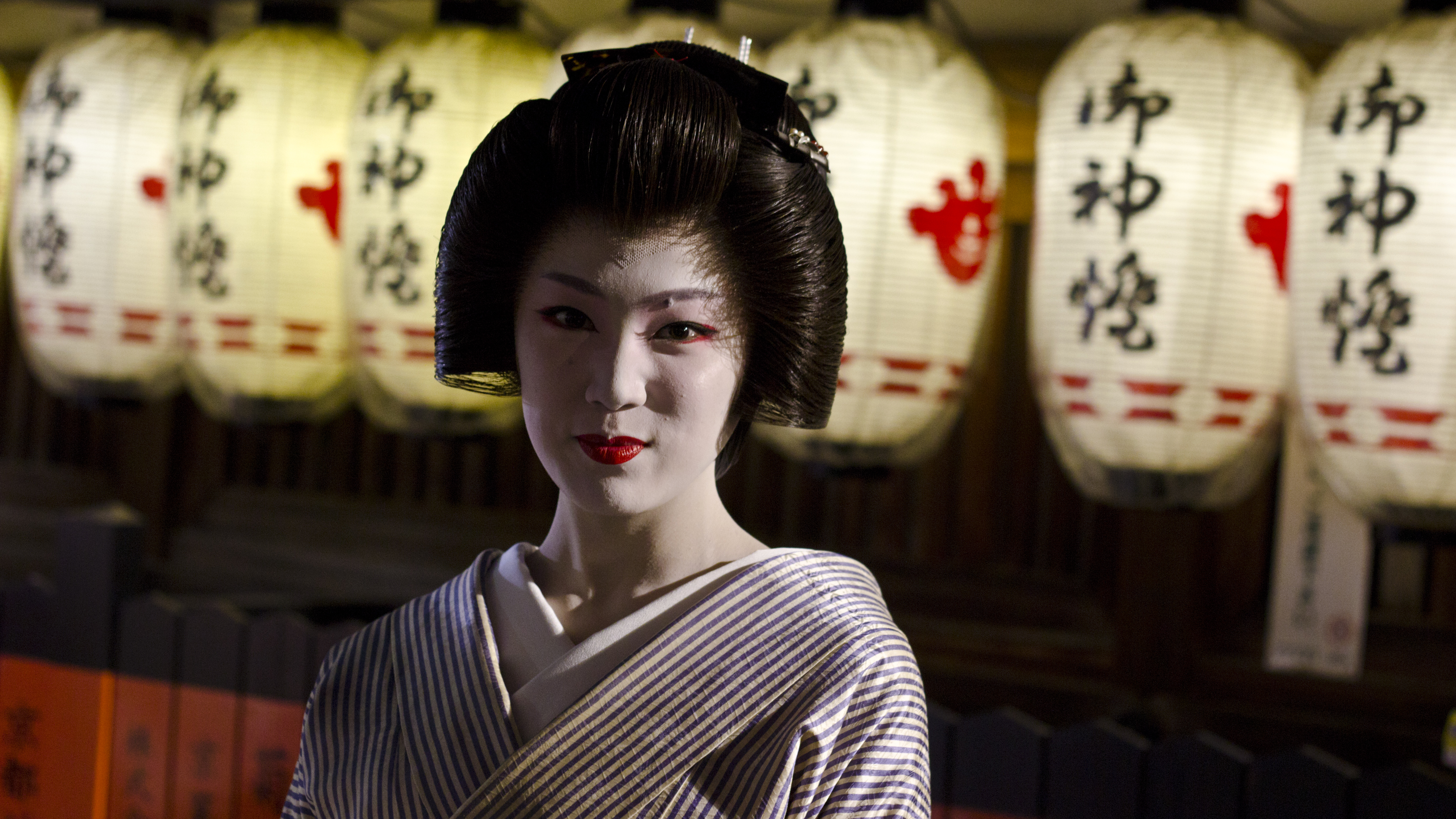
Gion Higashi geiko Tsunemomo surrounded by paper lanterns

Gion (祇園) (Note: In traditional kana spelling, Gion is spelt ぎをん, which in modern orthography is ぎおん. The first kanji in the name's kanji spelling, 祇, is properly as 示 + 氏, but is often written as ネ + 氏 instead, and on computers depends on the font used. Occasionally '祗' (示 + 氐) is seen, but this is a mistake, as these are distinct characters.) is a district of Higashiyama-ku, Kyoto, Japan, originating as an entertainment district in the Sengoku period, in front of Yasaka Shrine (Gion Shrine). The district was built to accommodate the needs of travellers and visitors to the shrine. It eventually evolved to become one of the most exclusive and well-known geisha districts in all of Japan. Gion is the Japanese translation (via Chinese Qiyuan) of the Buddhist term Jetavana. Yasaka Shrine, located in this district is the center of the Gion faith.

The geisha in Kyoto do not refer to themselves as geisha, instead using the local term 'geiko'. While the term geisha means "artist" or "person of the arts", the more direct term geiko means essentially "a woman of art".

== Divisions ==
Gion houses two hanamachi, or geisha districts: Gion Kobu (祇園甲部) and Gion Higashi (祇園東). The two were originally the same district, but split in 1881. Gion Kobu is larger, occupying most of the district including the famous Hanamikoji street, while Gion Higashi is smaller and occupies the northeast corner, centered on its rehearsal hall. Despite the considerable decline in the number of geisha in Gion in the last century, the area is still famous for the preservation of forms of traditional architecture and entertainment.

Part of this district has been declared a national historical preservation district. The City of Kyoto has undertaken a number of restorative projects to enhance the beauty and historical authenticity of Kyoto's hanamachi, such as relocating overhead utilities underground. Since 1986, the city has removed electric poles from a number of popular tourist destinations such as Nene no Michi (ねねの道), Hanamikoji (花見小路), and Ponto-chō (先斗町).

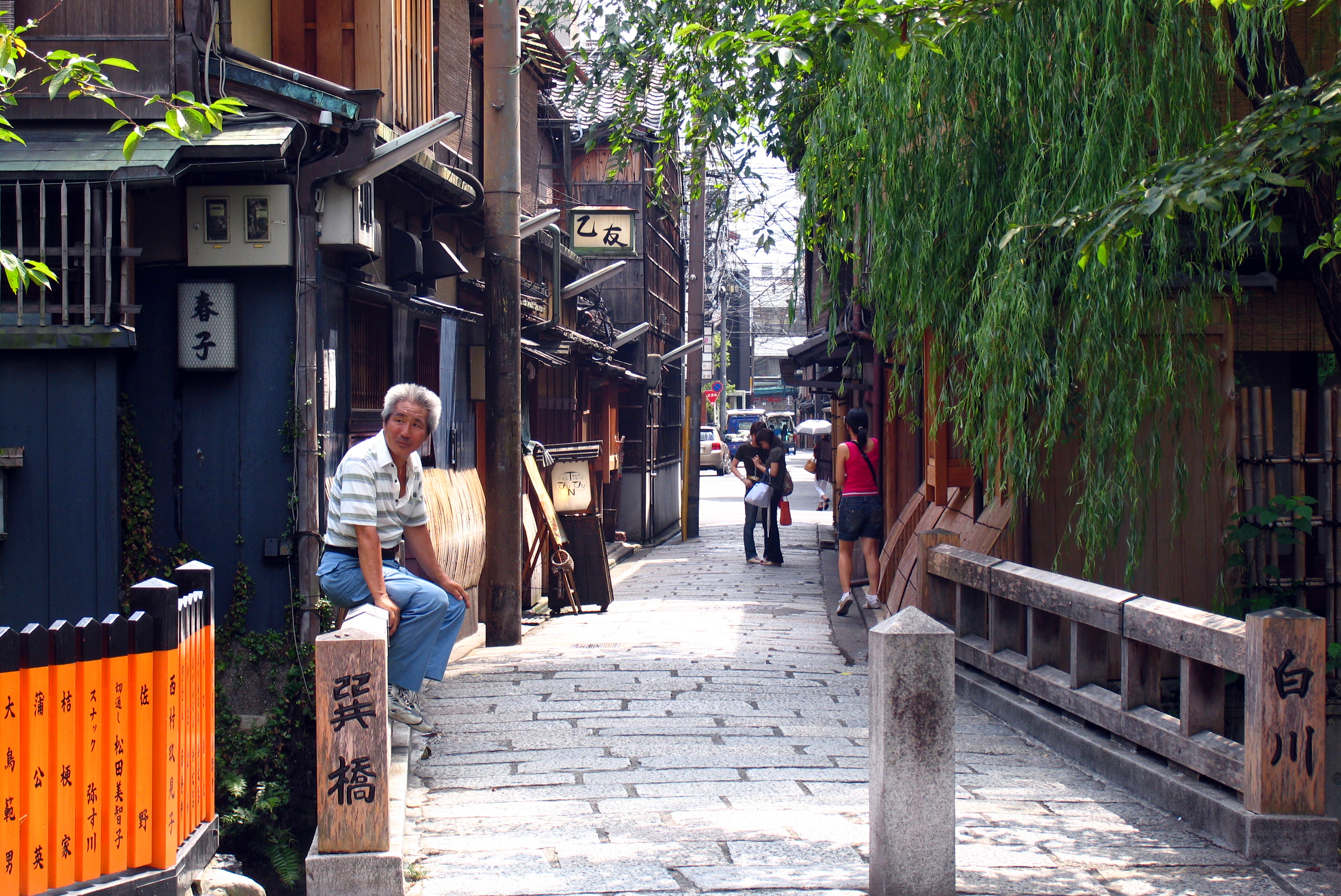
Street in Gion

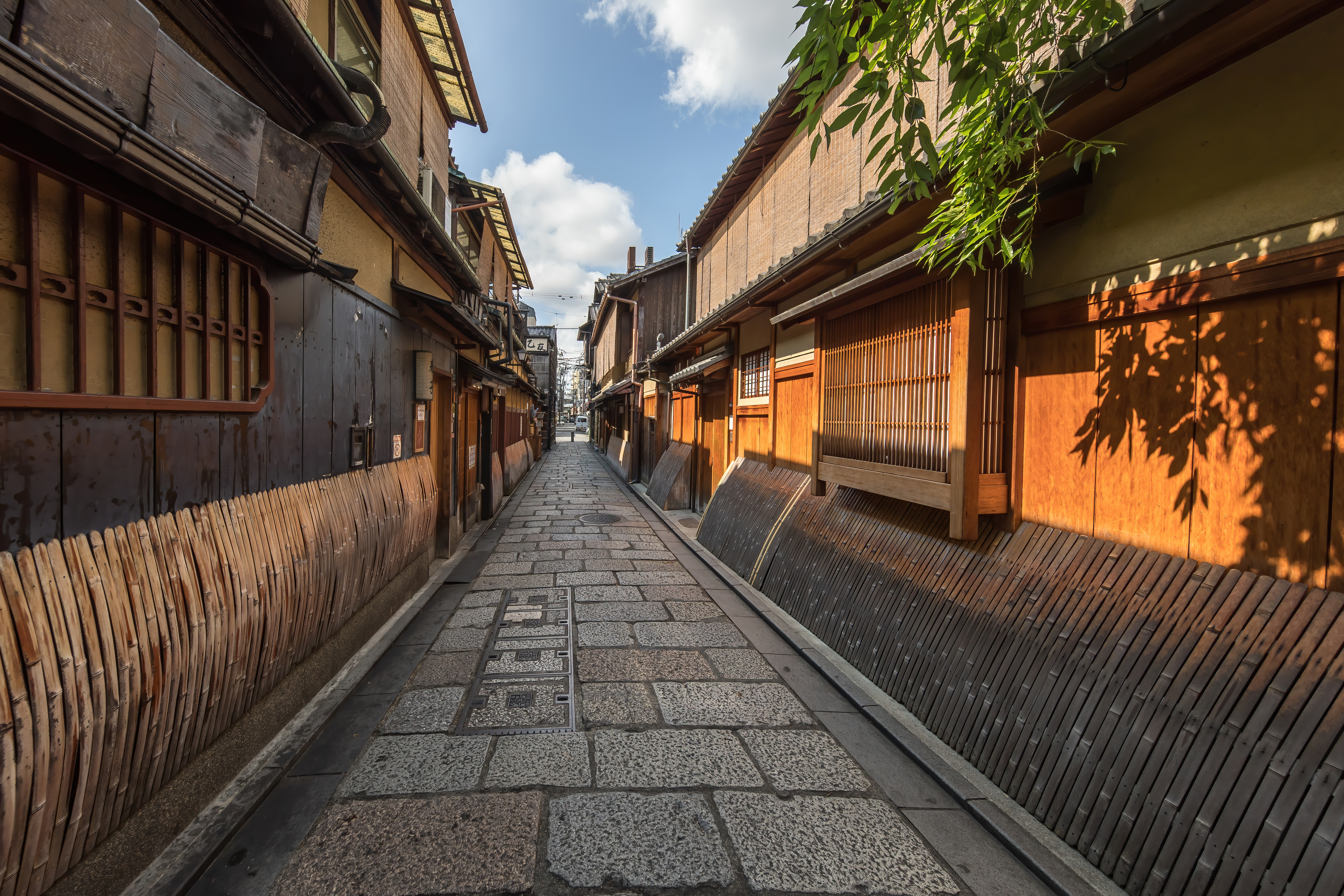
Dwellings with sudare in the street leading to the Gion Tatsumi Bridge

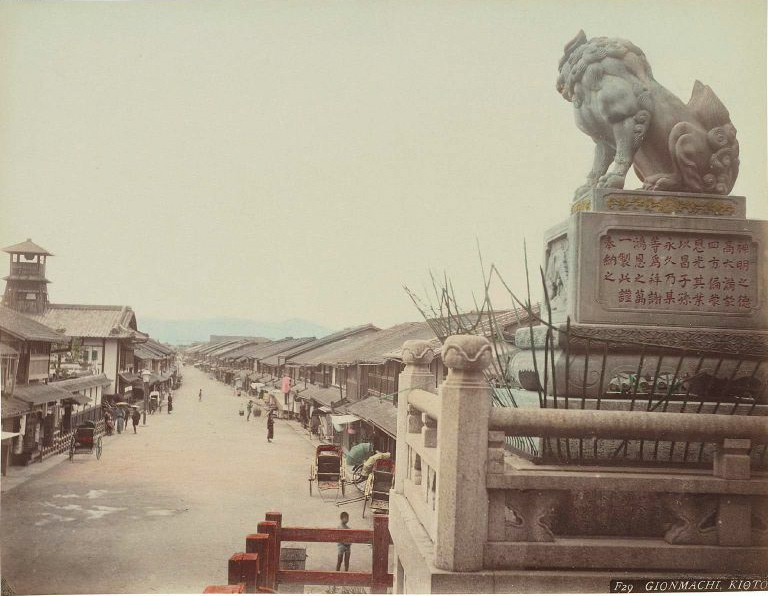
View of Shijo-dori in 1886

== Entertainment ==
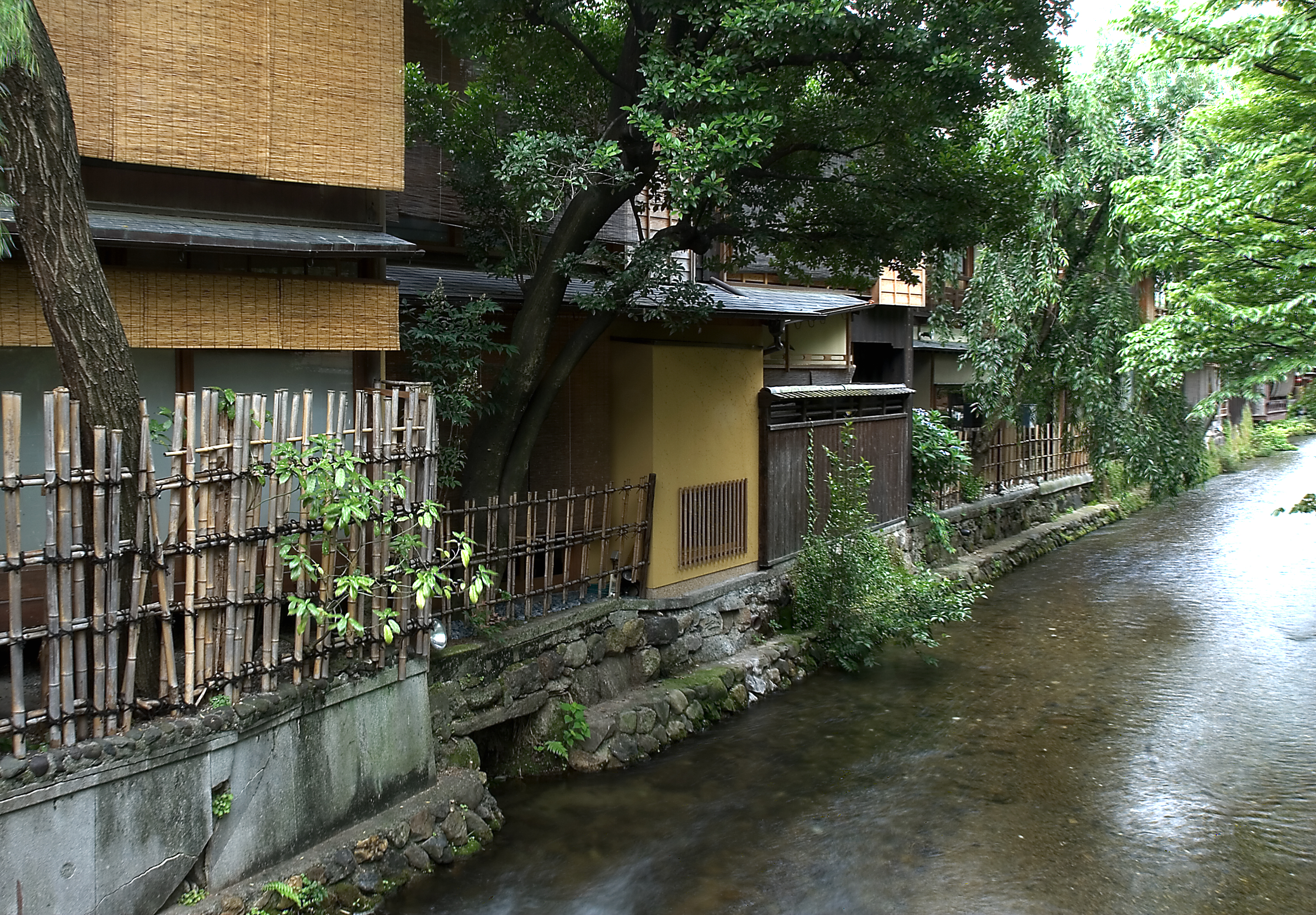
Shirakawa River in the Gion district, showing the rear of some ochaya

=== Geisha ===
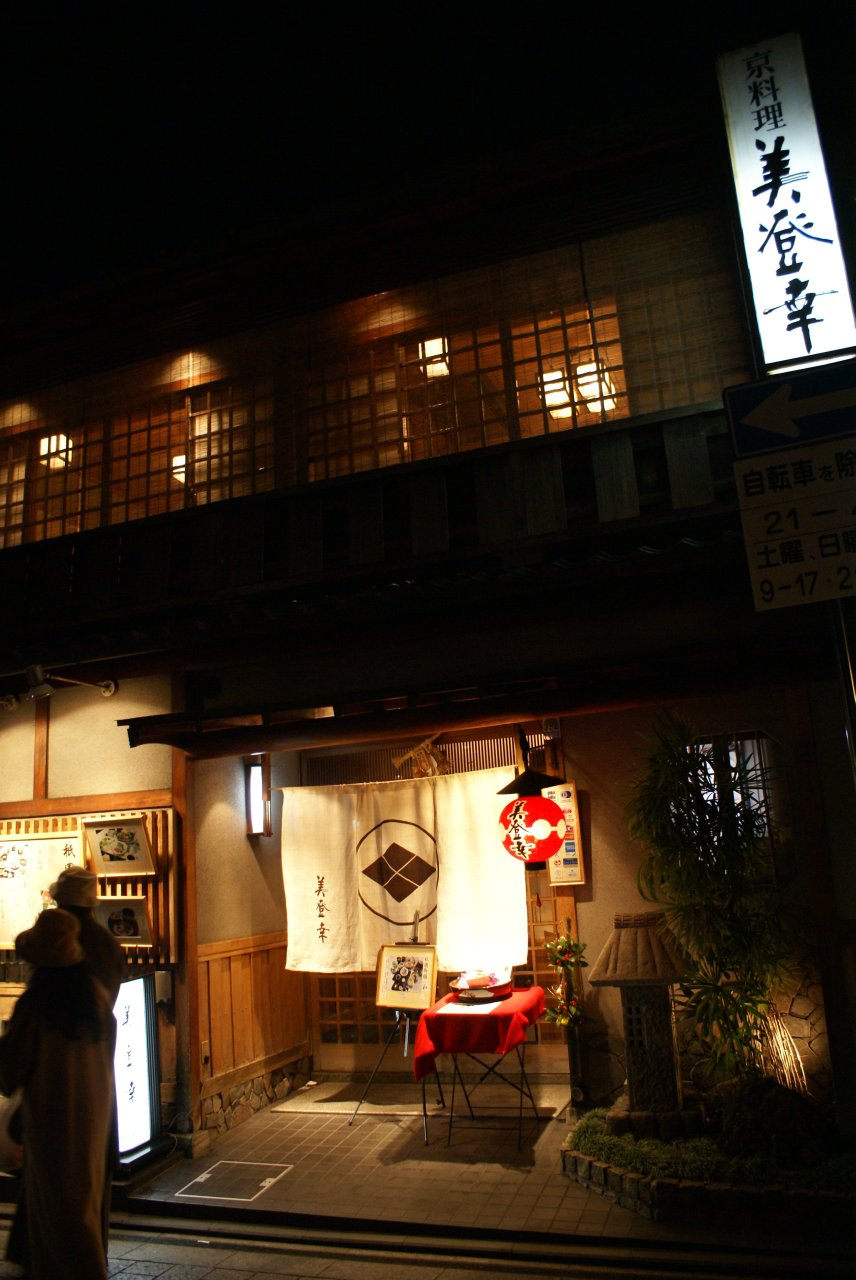
A typical kaiseki restaurant in Gion

Gion retains a number of old-style Japanese houses called machiya, which roughly translates to "townhouse", some of which function as ochaya, or "teahouses", where geisha entertain guests at parties, involving singing, traditional dance performances, drinking games and conversation. Both geisha and maiko can be seen travelling throughout the district to attend parties, lessons and various other engagements. A number of dressing-up parlors, known as henshin studios, will dress tourists up as maiko or geisha for a fee, allowing them to walk through the streets of Gion and have their photo taken; by law in Kyoto, these tourists are required to dress inaccurately, so as not to impersonate geisha or maiko.

Geisha and maiko both perform in public dance events staged yearly, such as the Miyako Odori; some also perform dances for tourists at Gion Corner.

=== Other ===
There are also many modern entertainment establishments in Gion – restaurants, bars, clubs, pachinko, off-track betting, and a very large number of tourist-oriented establishments, particularly along Shijō Street; the region is both a major tourist hub, and a popular nightlife spot for locals. Though a number of streets are modern in construction, a number of quieter streets featuring traditional architecture also exist, such as Hanami Lane (花見小路, Hanami-kōji; "flower-viewing lane") and its environs, ranging from Shijō Street at the north end, anchored by the famous Ichiriki Tei, and running south to the major temple of Kennin-ji.

The stretch of the Shirakawa River before it enters the Kamo river is also a popular preserved area. It is lined on the south side with traditional establishments which directly face the river, and some are accessed by crossing bridges from the north side. The north side was previously also lined with buildings, but these were torn down in World War II as a fire-prevention measure, and the section is now primarily a pedestrian street, lined with cherry blossoms. These are lit up in the evening in the spring, and the area is active year-round.

== Annual events ==
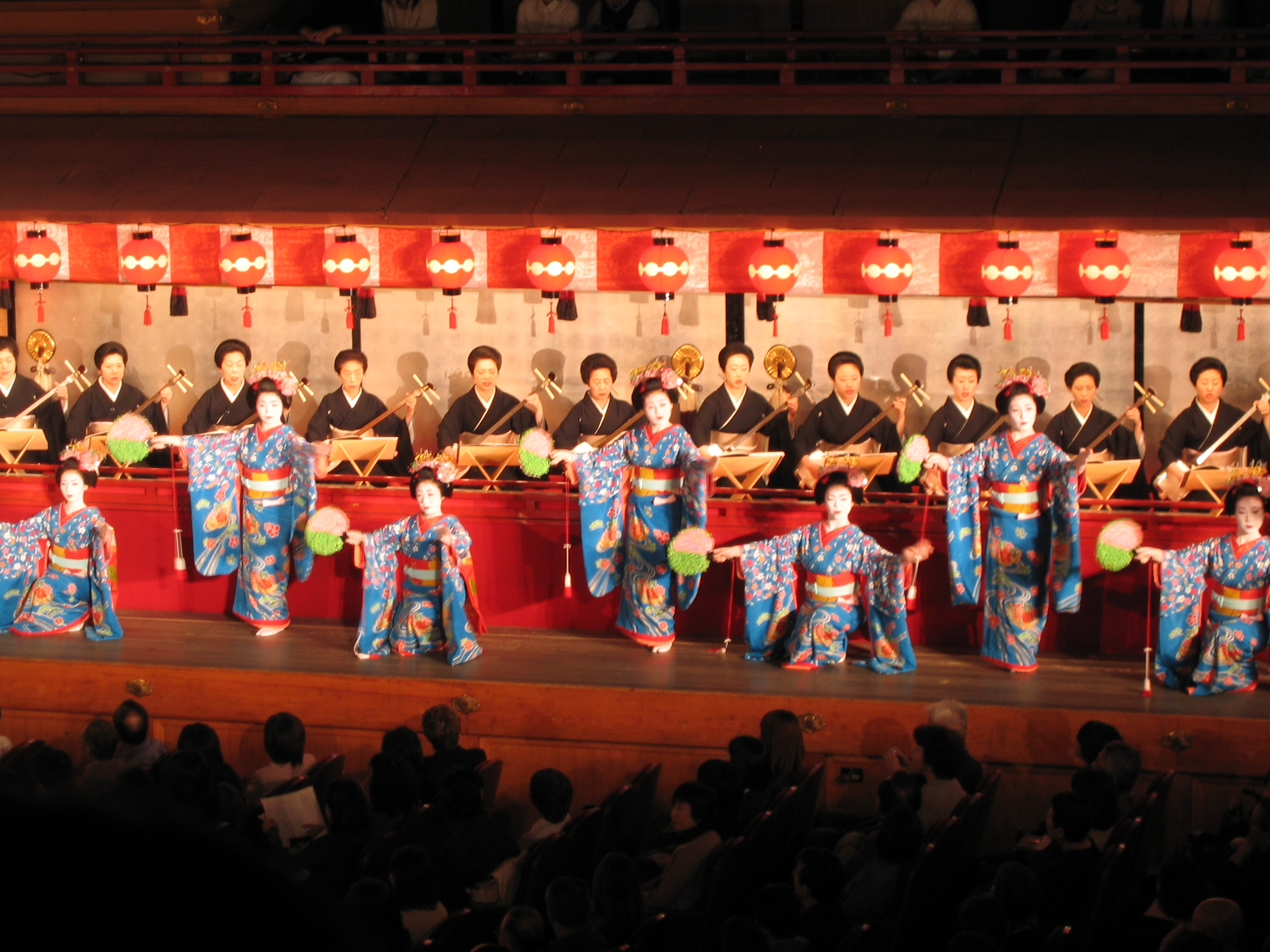
Miyako Odori

The geisha and maiko of Gion both perform annual public dances, as do all five geisha districts in Kyoto. The oldest of these date to the Kyoto exhibition of 1872. The more popular of these is the Miyako Odori, literally "Dances of the Old Capital" (sometimes instead referred to as the "Cherry Blossom Dances"), staged by the geisha of Gion Kobu, which dates to 1872. The dances run from April 1 through April 30 each year during the height of the cherry blossom (sakura) season. Spectators from Japan and worldwide attend the events, which range from "cheap" seats on tatami mats on the floor, to reserved seats with a small tea ceremony beforehand. Gion Higashi holds a similar dance in early November, around autumn leaves, known as Gion Odori; this is more recent and has fewer performances.

== Education ==
The Kyoto Municipal Board of Education operates public elementary and junior high schools. Gionmachi Kitagawa and Gionmachi Minamigawa are zoned to Kaisei Elementary and Junior High School (開睛小中学校).

== In popular culture ==
- Gion is the setting of much of Arthur Golden's novel Memoirs of a Geisha.
- Gion Kobu was also where Mineko Iwasaki lived and conducted business as a geisha, as mentioned in her autobiography Geisha of Gion.
- Gion is the setting of several films by Kenji Mizoguchi, including:
  - 1936 Sisters of the Gion (祇園の姉妹, Gion no kyōdai)
  - 1953 A Geisha aka Gion Music Festival (祇園囃子, Gion bayashi)
- Part of the Gion area is featured as a photo travel landscape in the 2010 racing video game Gran Turismo 5

== See also ==
- Kyoto hanamachi
- Miyagawachō, another district located just south of Gion
- Pontochō, another district on west side of Kamo river
- Kamishichiken, the oldest district in Kyoto
- Gion Matsuri, one of the largest annual festival in Japan, taking its name from the district
