= Baennori =

Korean art and boat culture

Baennori (Korean: 뱃놀이) is a ritual of artwork appreciation on boats. It means "to appreciate artwork while boating", which was mainly held by yangban, who were the privileged classes of the Joseon period. Baennori for the aristocratic classes can be divided into two types: The Sojourn, where people would stay on the boat in a specific area; and Excursion, where people would move around in their boats over a relatively long period. Baennori does not mean just sitting still on a scenic boat but also enjoying music, poetry, and painting. It also involved drinking and partaking in ad-lib poetry on boats. Baennori was influential since it involved leaving home to travel to places in nature while appreciating arts. It illustrated how the yangban appreciated arts.

== History ==
Baetnori is known as Seonyu in Chinese. During the Joseon dynasty, foreign envoys were invited on boats which floated on the Han river as a welcome party for them. Baetnori in front of Buyongdae, Nakdonggangga, Pungcheon-myeon, Andong, North Gyeongsang Province is popular for its propensity as representing scholarships for Gimang in July. The commoners had fun by boating during Sambok, and fishing fishes such as Gobies and boiling Maeuntang or fish porridge. From ancient times, scholars enjoyed the wind, such as floating boats on the river, admiring the coastal scenery, making poetry or making sounds according to their interests, and drinking sashimi with fish and boiling stew. In particular, during the Joseon dynasty, foreign envoys were welcomed, boats were floated on the Han River, and city halls were held to serve as a welcome party for them. Even in the New Year of 1450 (Sejong 32), there is a record of giving good luck when the Ming dynasty envoys Ye-gyeom Si and Sama-sun, the envoys of the Ming dynasty, came. The scene of Seonyu at this time was written in detail. Among them, he said, "The ship was washed, and a small roof was made in the middle and covered with grass". In many of the games played, it is common for gisaengs or women from outcast families to ride with them and create wind music to raise the atmosphere. The common people especially enjoyed boating during the sambok, and they enjoyed the day by fishing for fish such as gobies and boiling maeuntang or eating fish porridge. From ancient times, Gwangjin, Noryang, Yongsan, Mapo, and Yanghwajin have been cited as boat playgrounds in Seoul. Boating is done by floating the boat in one place, but if you move around and play, the scenery around you changes, making it even more exciting.

== Baetnori and Korea ==
The Baetnori usually takes place from spring to the end of fall and is considered as one of the most advanced recreational game of the time. Ambassadors from other countries to Korea were also invited by the court to host the Batenori boat game. This is also the way the rich show their power and wealth. Usually "boat singing" (Betnae) is the name of a fisherman's song while fishing or sailing. But Gyeonggi Province's folk song "Singing the Boat" (Baetnorae) is a song that expresses the finale of the boat player's excitement. Koreans have the proverb that "Pyeongan's boss won't take it if he doesn't like it" implying that "even if it's a good thing, it's impossible to force him if he doesn't like it." The place called Pyeongan is the intersection of ancient China and Joseon. Pyeongan belonging to North Korea now had more silver mines than Hanyang (former name of Seoul), and because of that, it had developed a prosperous life.

== Societal influence ==
It had a special meaning not only because of the scenery of the cruise, but also because it was a rare pastime to participate. The reason is that the cost of renting a boat, decorating a boat, preparing food and drinking, and hiring the okiya to serve on the trip is very expensive. But for fishermen in the fishing village, their daily boat rides are also games. When sailing for the river to the sea, when throwing fishing nets, the singing verses are always accompanied by their river life. Unlike scholars who only consider yachts as a way to enjoy good life, for fishermen, the waters of the river are as close to them as they should be, but also have the mysterious power of nature. The sound of singing in the same year is saturated with sea breeze, telling the story of the happy life of the people of the river.
