= Mineko Iwasaki =

Japanese businesswoman and former well-known geisha

- 岩崎峰子
- Born: Masako Tanaka; November 2, 1949 (age 77)
- Spouse: Jinichiro Iwasaki (née Sato) (m. 1982; died 2009)
- Children: Kosuke (born 1983)

Mineko Iwasaki (岩崎 峰子/岩崎 究香, Iwasaki Mineko; born Masako Tanaka (田中 政子), 2 November 1949) is a Japanese businesswoman, author and former geisha. Iwasaki was the most famous geisha in Japan until her sudden retirement at the age of 29. Known for her performances for celebrity and royalty during her geisha life, Iwasaki was the heir apparent (atotori) to her geisha house (okiya) while she was just a young apprentice.

American author Arthur Golden interviewed her for background information when writing his 1997 book, Memoirs of a Geisha. Iwasaki later regretted interviewing for Golden, having cited a breach of confidentiality, and later sued and settled out of court with Golden for the parallelism between his book and her life. In 2002, she released her own autobiography, titled Geisha of Gion in the UK and Geisha: A Life in the US.

== Life and career ==
Iwasaki was born as Masako Tanaka to Shigezo and Chie (née Akamatsu) Tanaka. She had ten siblings: brothers Seiichiro, Ryozo, Kozo, Fumio, and sisters Yaeko, Kikuko, Kuniko, Yoshiko, Tomiko, Yukiko.

She left home at the age of four to begin studying traditional Japanese dance at the Iwasaki okiya (geisha house) in the Gion district of Kyoto. She was legally adopted by the okiya's owner, Madame Oima, and began using its family name of Iwasaki.

Iwasaki became a maiko (apprentice geisha) at the age of 15, and was chosen as the house's atotori, or heir. Iwasaki also received the name "Mineko", as prescribed by a Japanese fortune-teller. By age 16, she had earned a reputation as Japan's most popular maiko and graduated to geisha status on her 21st birthday.

According to her autobiography, Iwasaki worked herself to her physical and mental limits, developing at one point a near-fatal kidney condition from which she eventually recovered. Iwasaki entertained numerous celebrities and foreign dignitaries, including the United Kingdom's Queen Elizabeth II and Prince Charles. Iwasaki's fame also made her the subject of jealousy and gossip, and she frequently experienced harassment and assault, often of a sexual nature.

After the death of one of her most significant mentors in 1980, Iwasaki became increasingly frustrated with the tradition-bound world of the geisha community, especially inadequacies in the education system. Iwasaki unexpectedly retired at the height of her career, at the age of 29. She hoped that her decision would shock Gion into reform; however, even after over 70 other high ranking geisha followed her into early retirement, nothing was changed. In her autobiography, Iwasaki speculated that the profession could be doomed if the industry failed to adapt to changing economic and social circumstances. She transitioned to a career in art after marrying artist Jin'ichirō Satō in 1982. They had a child, born in 1983.

== Memoirs of a Geisha ==
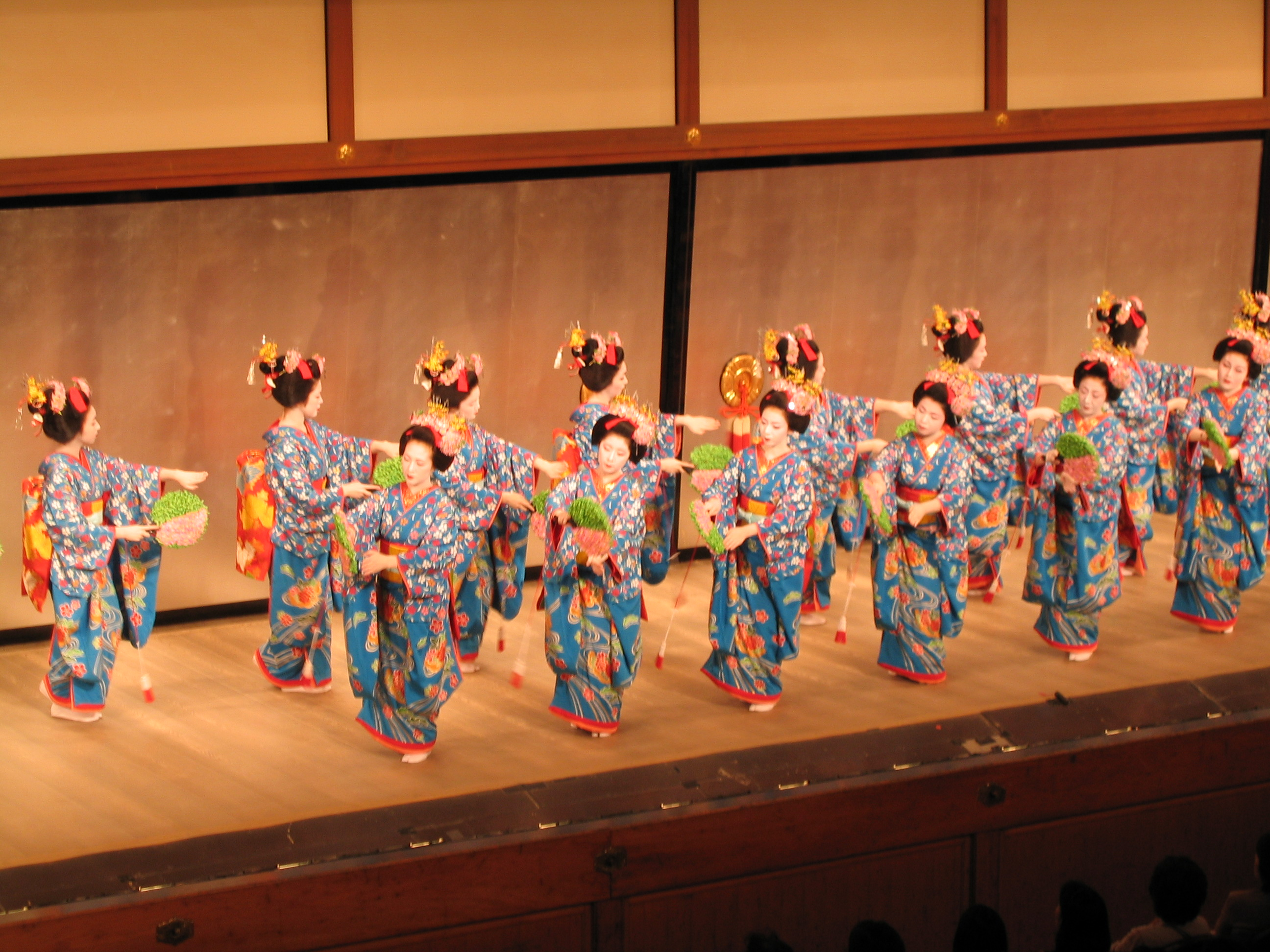
The Miyako Odori ("Cherry Blossom Dance"), in which Iwasaki participated as an apprentice geisha.

Iwasaki was one of several geisha interviewed by author Arthur Golden while researching for his novel Memoirs of a Geisha. According to Iwasaki, she agreed to speak with Golden on the condition that her involvement would be kept confidential. However, Golden revealed her identity by mentioning her name in the book's acknowledgements as well as several national interviews. After Memoirs was published, Iwasaki received criticism and even death threats for violating the traditional, unspoken code of silence within the geisha profession.

Iwasaki felt betrayed by Golden's use of information she considered confidential, and denounced the novel as being an inaccurate depiction of geisha life. She criticised in particular the novel's portrayal of geisha engaging in mizuage (a deflowering ritual undergone by some apprentices) as a matter of fact when graduating to geisha status. Iwasaki stated that she herself had not undergone mizuage, and that no such custom ever existed in Gion.

Iwasaki also took displeasure with Golden's use of a number of her life experiences, with the main character of Sayuri having a number of direct parallels to Iwasaki's career as a geisha. These experiences were at times portrayed negatively within the novel, despite their real-life counterparts having been positive experiences for Iwasaki.

Iwasaki later gave public interviews stating that many established geisha had criticised her actions and decision to be interviewed by Golden, the result of which ruptured the unwritten traditions of secrecy within the geisha community. Furthermore, Iwasaki stated that she had lost friends and relationships due to the scandal of being associated with the book, along with certain inconsistencies and fallacies about Gion.

Iwasaki sued Golden for breach of contract and defamation of character in 2001, which was settled out of court in 2003.

== Geisha of Gion ==
After the publication of Memoirs of a Geisha, Iwasaki decided to write an autobiography in contrast with Golden's novel. Her book, co-authored by Rande Gail Brown, was published as Geisha: A Life in the US and Geisha of Gion in the UK. The book detailed her experiences before, during and after her time as a geisha, and became a bestseller.
