= Onmae Street =

Street in Kyoto city, Japan

Onmae Street (御前通 おんまえどおり Onmae dōri) is an important street that runs form north to south in the west side of the city of Kyoto. It extends for approximately 7 km from Teranouchi Street in the north to Fudanotsuji street in the south, between Tenjin Street (west side) and Shimonomori Street (east side).

== History ==
During the period of the Heian-kyō, its name was Nishi Ōmiya Ōji Street and according to records it was up to 24m wide. Regarding the origin of its name, it is believed that as the main gate of the Kitano Tenmagū Shrine is located by this street, locals began calling it "Onmae".

== Present Day ==
Currently the street runs on the east side of the Kitano Tenmangū Shrine. This 400m section in particular is now paved with cobblestone thanks to a construction project executed by the city of Kyoto, which was completed in December 2019.

The section north of Shijō Street becomes a one-way street, quite narrow in some areas.

== Relevant Landmarks Along the Street ==
- Kitano Tenmagū Shrine
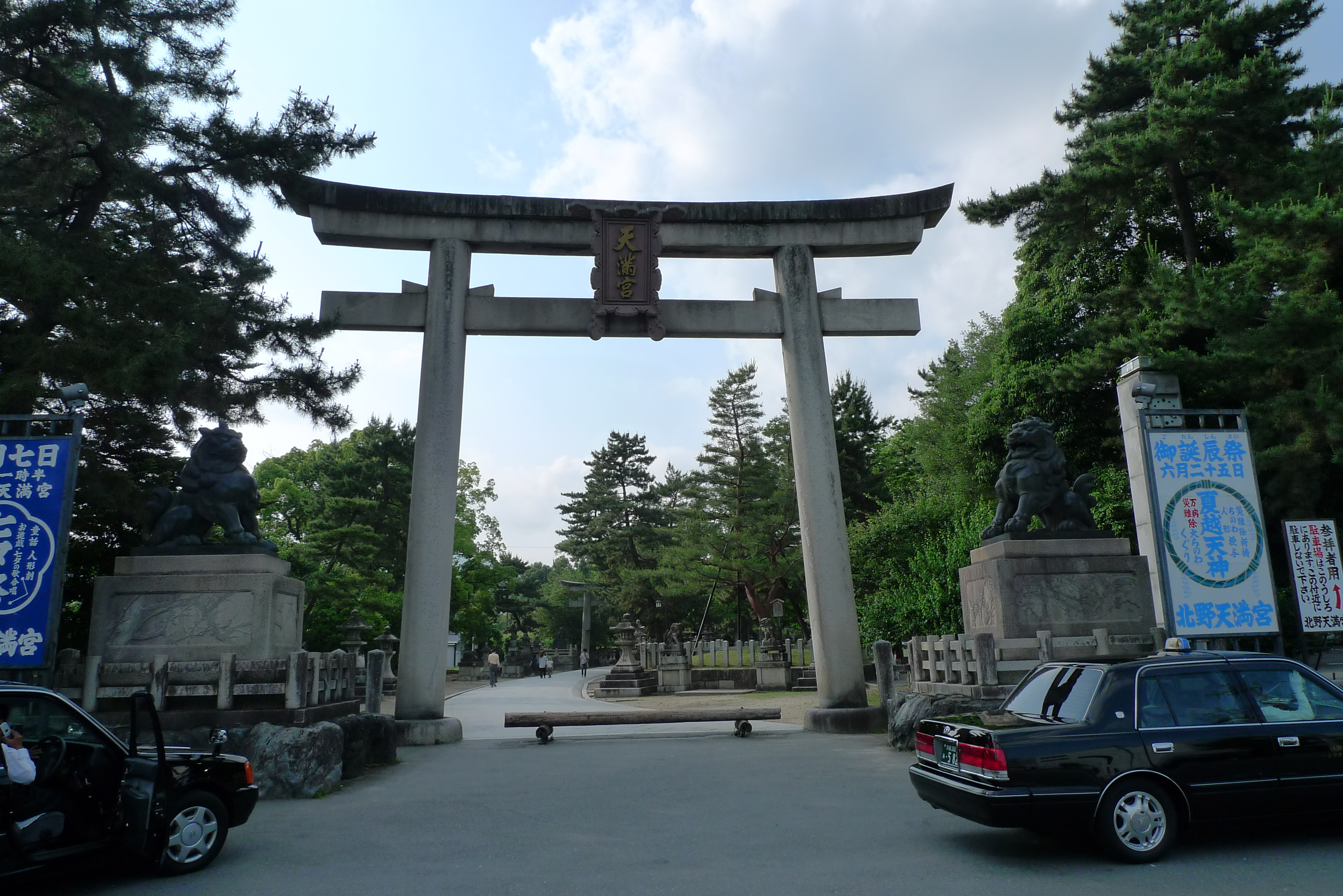
  Main entrance to the Kitano Tenmangū.
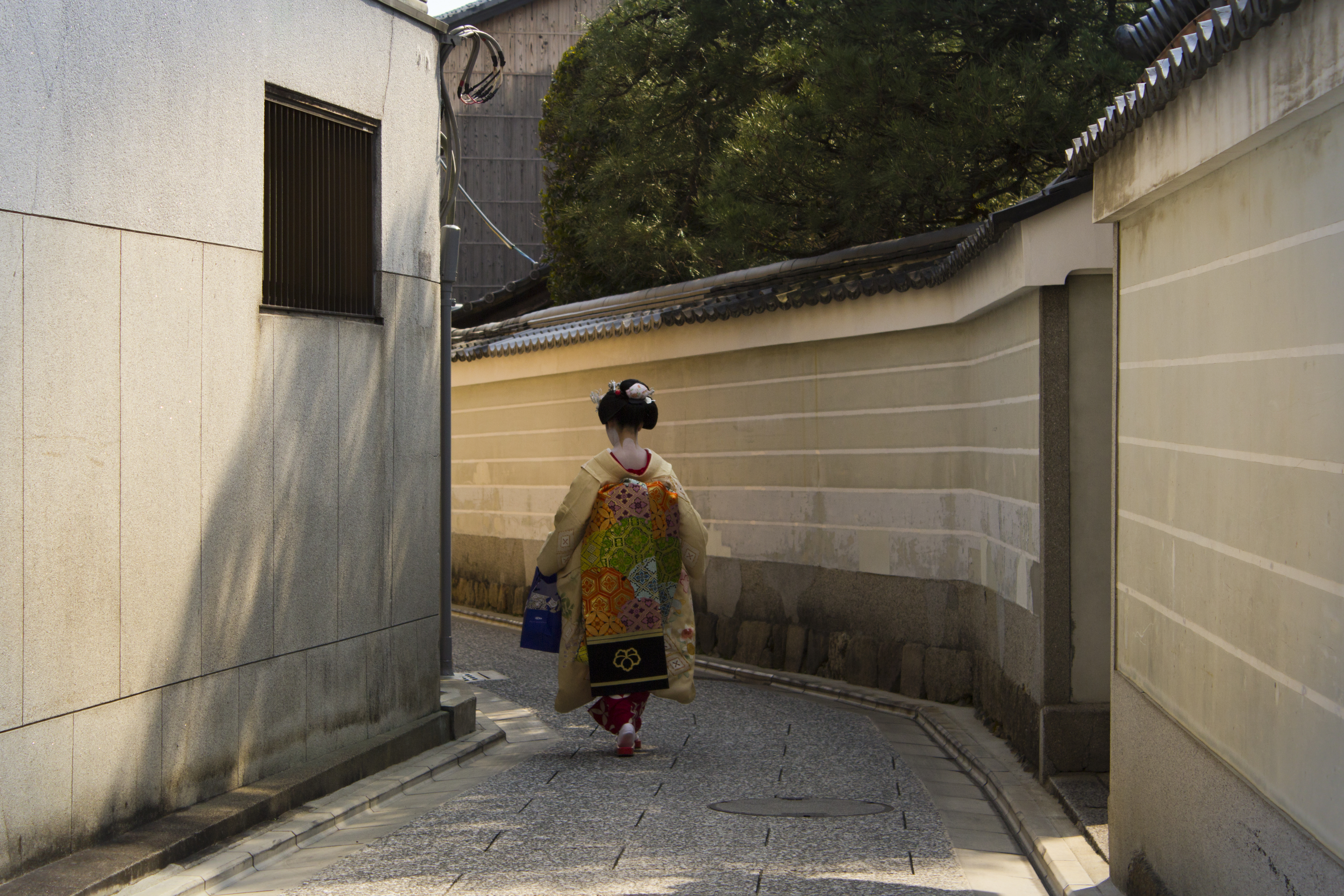
- Maiko (geisha apprentice) in Kamishichiken.
  Kamishichiken
- Inazumi Jinja
- Kyoto HBS Museum
