= Kamishichiken =

Geisha district in Kyoto

Coordinates: 35°01′47″N 135°44′12″E

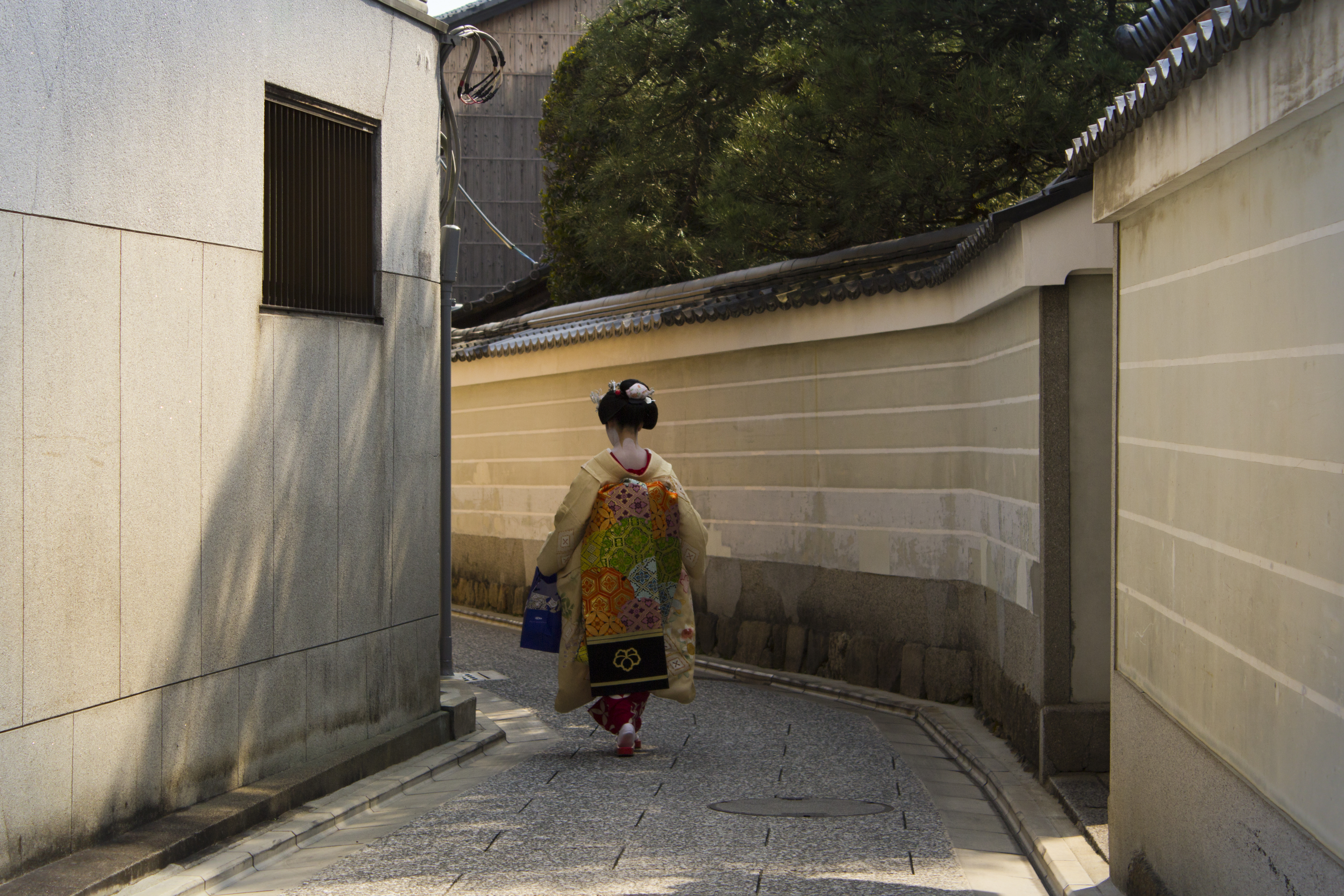
A maiko (apprentice geisha) in Kamishichiken

Kamishichiken (上七軒), pronounced locally as Kamihichiken, is a district of northwest Kyoto, Japan. It is the oldest hanamachi (geisha district) in Kyoto, and is located just east of the Kitano Tenman-gū shrine. The name Kamishichiken literally means "Seven Upper Houses". These refer to the seven teahouses built from the equipment and material left over from the rebuilding of the Kitano Shrine in the Muromachi era (1333–1573).

Kamishichiken is located in Kyoto's Nishijin area, which is known for traditional hand-woven textiles. The quiet streets of Kamigyō-ku are made up of dark wooden buildings, mainly ochaya (teahouses) and okiya (geisha houses). Unlike the other remaining districts, which are located close to the city center, Kamishichiken is further away, and accordingly significantly quieter and attracts fewer tourists. The geisha of this district are known for being subtle and demure, few in number but each highly accomplished dancers and musicians. There are approximately 25 maiko (apprentice geisha) and geisha in Kamishichiken, along with 11 teahouses.

The district crest is a ring of skewered dango (sweet dumplings). On lanterns they appear as red circles on white paper (as opposed to Gion, which uses a similar design, but with the reverse colors – white dango on a red background).

== Events ==
=== Plum Blossom Festival (Baikasai) ===
On February 25, the Plum Blossom Festival (梅花祭, Baikasai) is held at Kitano Tenman-gū. In addition to the plum blossoms, the festival features an open-air tea ceremony (野点, nodate), where tea and wagashi (traditional sweets) are served to 3,000 guests by geisha and maiko.

=== Kitano Odori ===
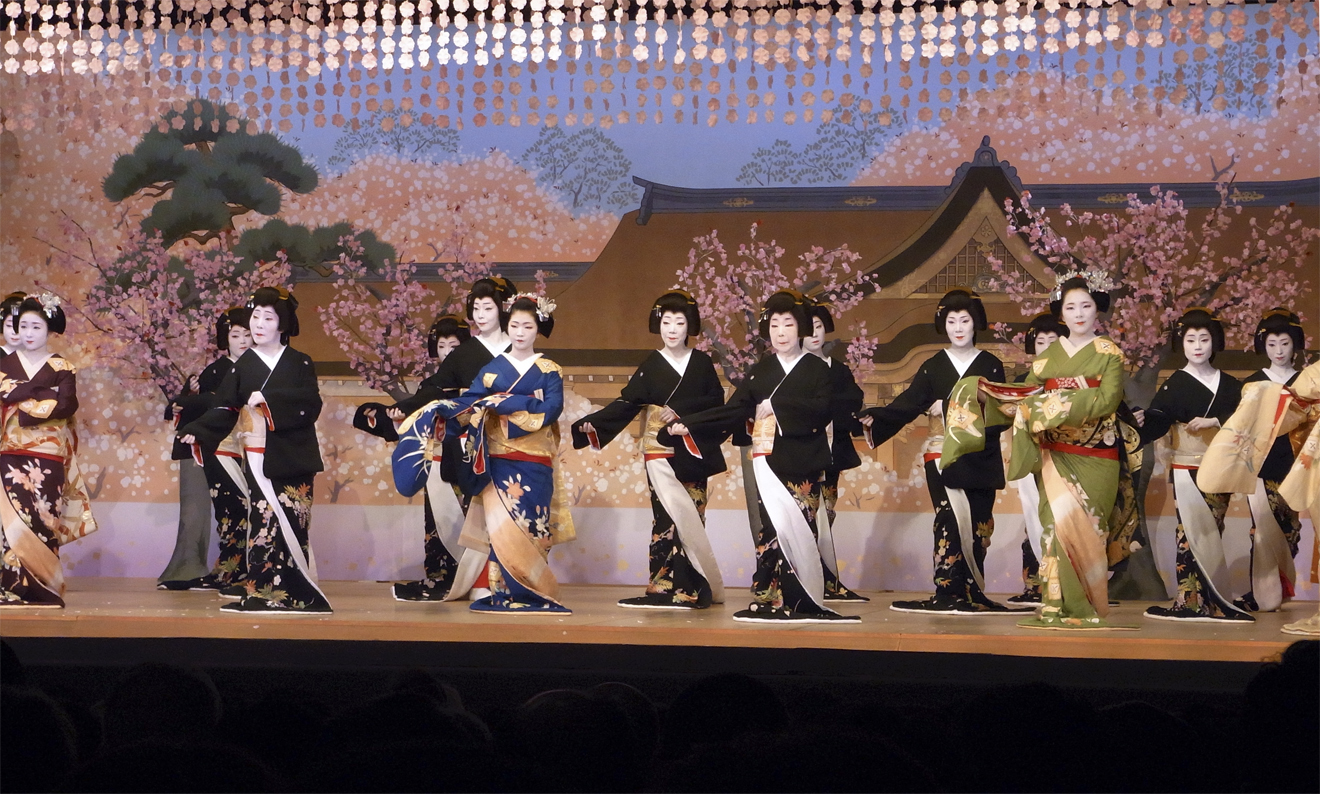
Kitano Odori performed in Kamishichiken

The annual district-wide dance, the Kitano Odori (北野をどり), is performed in April in the distinctive Hanayagi-ryu style of kyo-mai dance, sometimes called Kitano Kabuki.

=== Beer garden ===
As of 2010, a beer garden is open to the public at Kamishichiken Kaburenjo Theatre during summer months, and offers a unique chance to be served by maiko and geisha from July 1 until August 31 (from 6 pm until 10 pm); it also features traditional dances by the geisha in the evening.

== See also ==
Hanamachi in Kyoto (the Gokagai):

- Gion Kobu
- Gion Higashi
- Ponto-chō
- Miyagawa-chō
- Shimabara (defunct)
