= Shirakawa River =

Shirakawa Canal
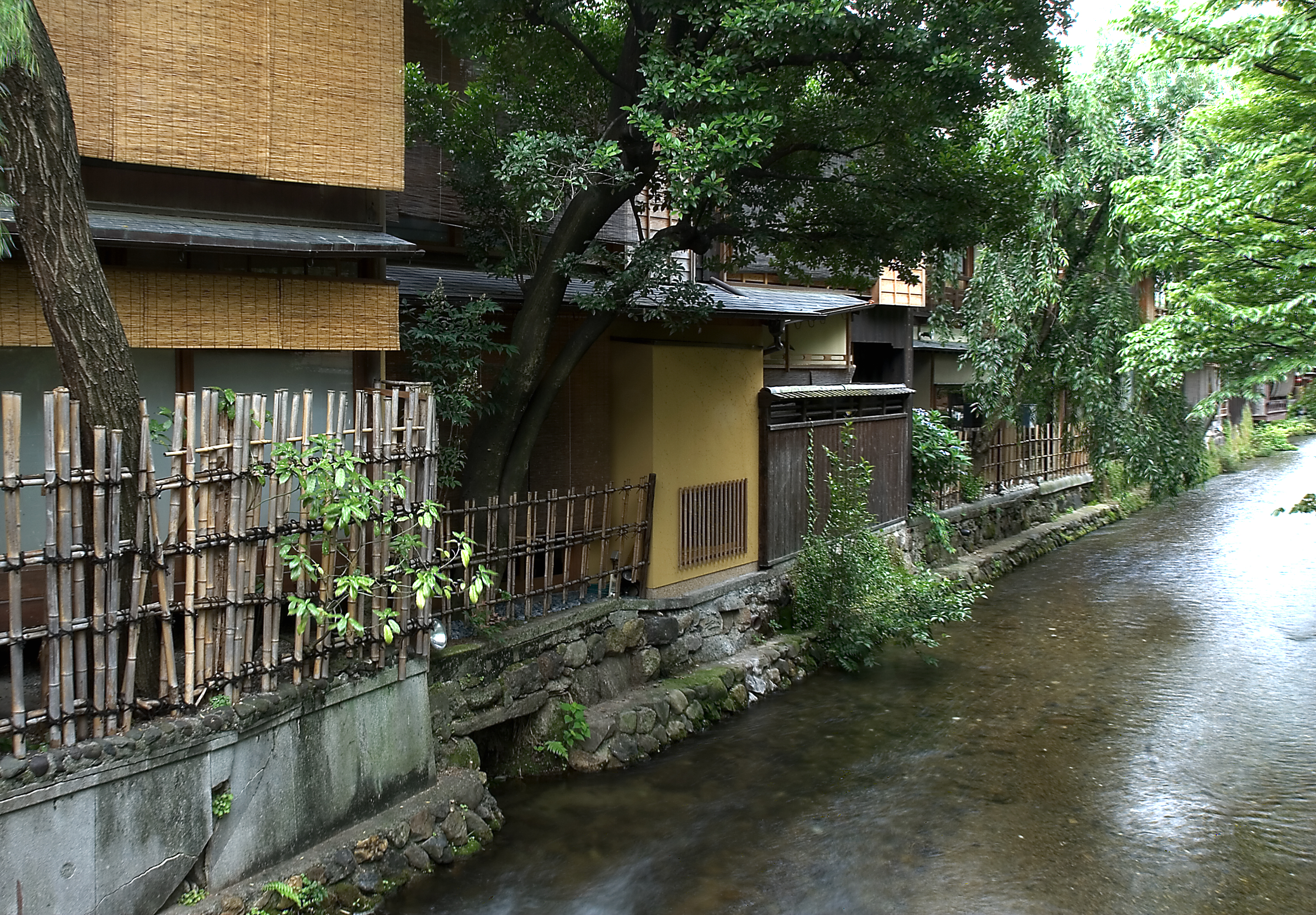
- Ochaya on the Shirakawa River in Gion

- Native name: 白川 (Japanese)

Location
- Country: Japan

Physical characteristics
- Mouth
  - location: Kamo River
- Length: 9.3 km (5.8 mi)
- Basin size: 13.1 km^{2} (5.1 sq mi)

Basin features
- River system: Yodo River

The Shirakawa River (白川, Shirakawa) is a river in Kyoto Prefecture, Japan. The river originates in the foothills of Mount Hiei on the outskirts of Kyoto, winds through the Geisha district of Gion, and eventually flows into the Kamo River.

Its name, which means "white river" in Japanese, probably refers to the white coloured sand and gravel that it carries from the hills east of Kyoto.

Many ochaya (geisha houses) and restaurants line the banks of the Shirakawa as it passes through the geisha district of Gion, in Kyoto.

== Shirakawa-suna ==
Most Japanese rock gardens in Kyoto have historically used gravel as one of their design elements. Sourced from the upper reaches of the Shirakawa River it is known as Shirakawa-suna, (白川砂利, "Shirakawa-sand") despite the individual pieces being much bigger than the grains of what is regarded as normal suna (sand). The individual pieces vary from 2 mm to up to even 30 to 50 mm in size.

This type of muted black-speckled granite which is known for its rather muted colour palette is a mix of three main minerals, white feldspar, grey quartz, and black mica which matches the aesthetic for most Japanese rock gardens. Shirakawa-suna also has an eroded texture that alternates between jagged and smooth and is prized for its ability to hold raked grooves, with patterns lasting weeks unless weather, animals or humans intervene.

As of 2018 in Kyoto alone there are 341 areas spread over 166 temples covering a surface area of over 29,000 m^{2} which have used Shirakawa-suna. Gravel is used in the entrance, main garden, and corridor area and takes four forms, spread gravel, gravel terrace, gravel pile, and garden path. Among the gardens which used Shirakawa-suna have been Ryōan-ji and Daitoku-ji.

Since the late 1950s the river has been a protected waterway and extraction of gravel from the river has been illegal. Over time the gravel in a garden becomes weather-beaten and becomes finer, forcing gardeners to occasionally replenish it in order for the gravel to retain the patterns made in them. Since the banning of extraction from the Shirakawa River the gravel used for both maintenance of existing gardens and the creation of new ones is sourced from quarried mountain granite of similar composition that is crushed and sieved. However the process of manufacturing creates rounded particles of the same size, lacking the pattern holding characteristics of true Shirakawa-suna, which have corners and are not uniform in size.
