= Ichiriki Chaya =

Ochaya in Kyoto

Coordinates: 35.003496°N 135.775051°E

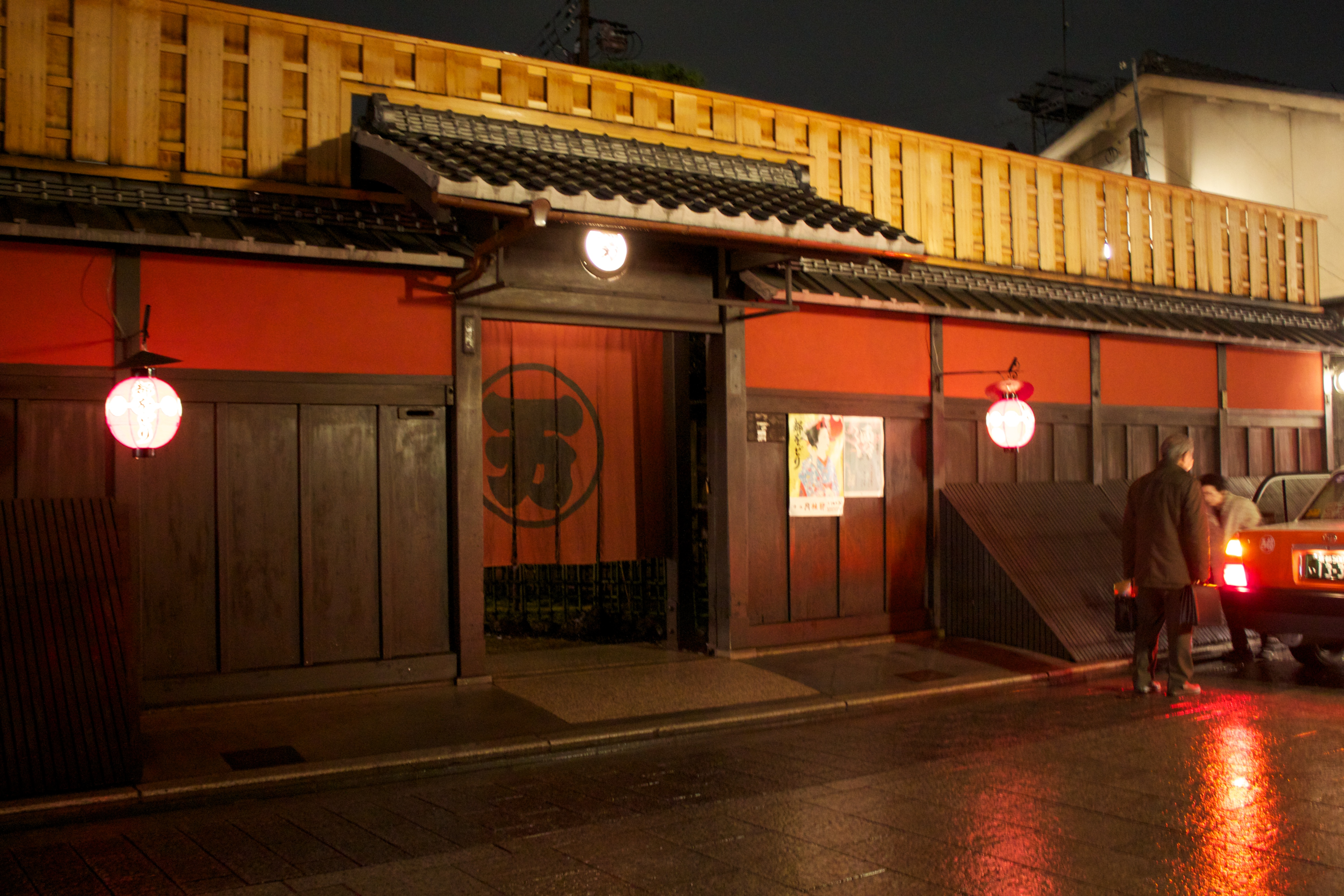
The entrance of the Ichiriki

The Ichiriki Teahouse (一力茶屋, Ichiriki Chaya), formerly Ichiriki Mansion (一力亭, Ichiriki-tei), is an historic ochaya ("tea house") in Kyoto, Japan. It is located on the southeast corner of Shijō Street and Hanami Lane, its entrance right at the heart of Gion's Kobu district.

It is considered an exclusive and high-end establishment; access is invitation only. The teahouse has become well known as a result of its role in the story of the forty-seven rōnin. The current teahouse proprietor is Jirou-emon Sugiura.

== History ==
Ichiriki is more than 300 years old, and has been a major centerpiece of Gion since the beginning of the entertainment district. Like other ochaya in Gion, Ichiriki is used to hold parties (ozashiki) by geisha. Traditionally, the teahouse was a place for entertaining powerful and high-status men in the business and political spheres.

The house is run by the Sugiura (杉浦) family, and the nameplate on the entrance gate reads Sugiura Jirou'uemon (杉浦治郎右衛門), (Note: The reading of 治郎右衛門 is ambiguous.) the name of the 9th generation head.

=== Name ===
The noren curtains at the entrance feature the characters ichi (一, "one") and riki (力, "strength") printed in black on a dark red ground, arranged to resemble the character man (万, "myriad, ten thousand"). The establishment was originally called yorozuya (万屋, general store), but was changed after it appeared in the play Kanadehon Chūshingura (仮名手本忠臣蔵) (a retelling of the story of the forty-seven rōnin). In the play, the teahouse had its name changed by splitting the 万 character into 一 and 力, thus disguising the name. After the success of the play, this change was adopted by the real version of the teahouse.

=== The forty-seven rōnin ===
Ichiriki plays a part in the events of the revenge of the forty-seven rōnin, also known as the Akō vendetta, a well known 18th century historical event that has been described as a Japanese "national legend". A group of samurai became masterless (rōnin) following the ritual suicide of their feudal lord (daimyō), who was sentenced to death for drawing a sword and injuring a man in the Imperial Palace. The man, Kira Yoshinaka, was attacked by the samurais' lord after he insulted him, but was not punished. Following this, the masterless samurai plotted to Yoshinaka's assassination for over two years.

The samurai, led by Oishi Kuranosuke, realized they would be monitored for signs they were planning to enact revenge. Thus, in an effort to dissuade the suspecting parties and imperial spies, they sent Kuranosuke to Kyoto, who spent many nights at the Ichiriki deliberately earning a reputation as a gambler and a drunkard. As Kuranosuke gave the appearance of becoming more and more relaxed and unprepared, Yoshinaka became less active in his suspicions and eventually relaxed his security. Because the Ichiriki provided the cover to mount an attack, the samurai were eventually successful in killing Yoshinaka, but were then forced to commit suicide themselves.

This story has been retold numerous times, spawning its own genre known as Chūshingura. These retellings have increased the fame of Ichiriki.

=== The fall of the shōgun ===
As modernisation spread through Japan during the final years of the Edo period, unrest grew within the country, with the age of the shōgun coming to an end. A number of murders of foreigners had led to tension rising between Japan and the Western powers, and this international pressure led many to question the legitimacy of the shōgun's rule.

Much of the plotting to overthrow the shogunate took place in secretive talks at Ichiriki, disguised as innocent evenings with friends. The plans came to fruition in 1868 when the last shōgun agreed to dissolve the shogunate at Nijō Castle.

== Access ==
Access to Ichiriki is highly restricted. One must have close ties to the teahouse before being allowed to become a patron. Patrons can often trace their relationship to the teahouse back generations, with only these patrons and their guests allowed in.

For a brief period of only a few nights in 2006, Ichiriki, along with five other teahouses in Gion – one from each of the five Kyoto geisha districts – offered general access to a small number of tourists who were unaccompanied by patrons, as part of a tourism promotion program at the request of the Kyoto City Tourist Association.

== Services offered ==
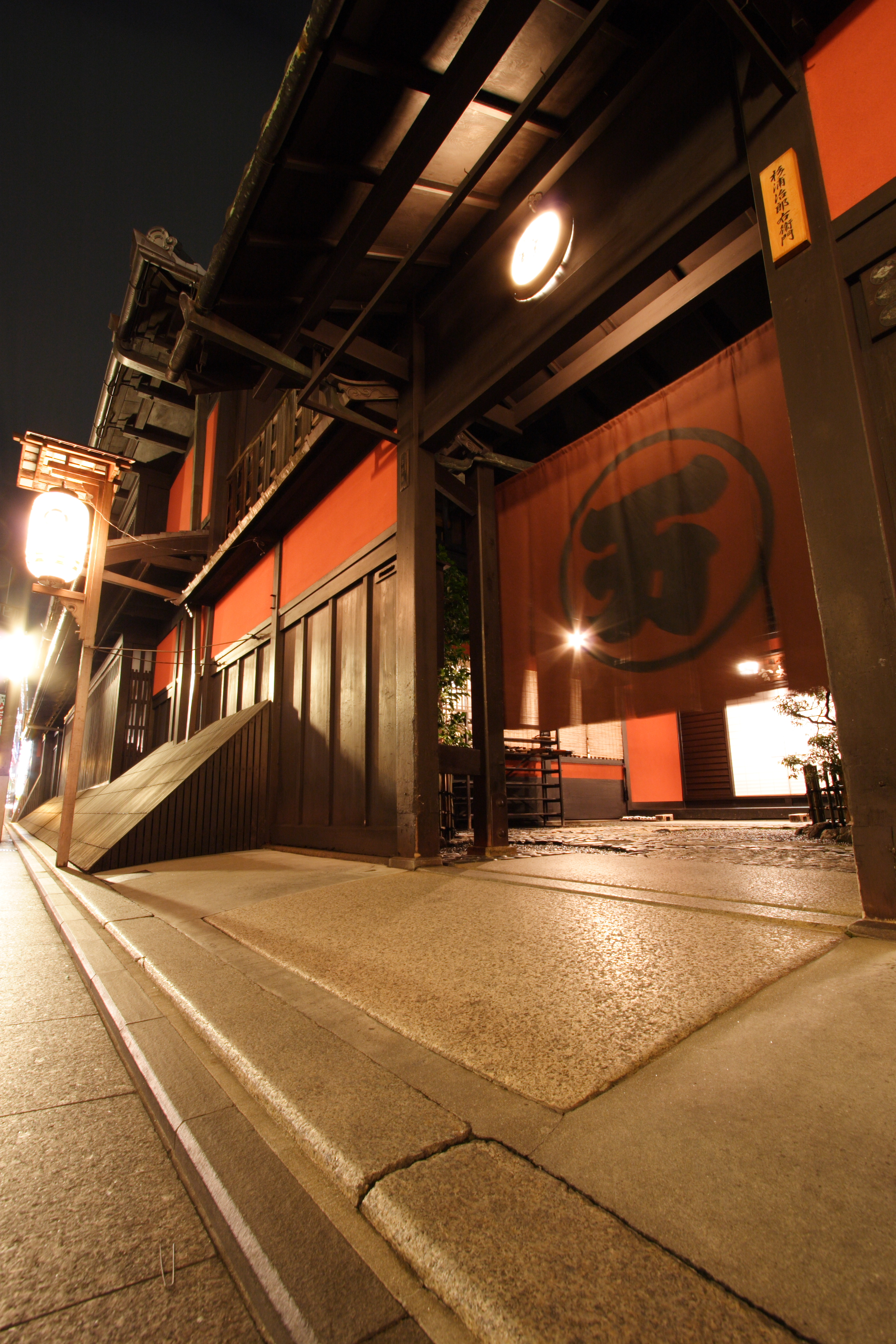
The entrance to the Ichiriki

Ichiriki offers similar services to other ochaya in Kyoto, with maiko and geisha hired from a geisha house (okiya) to provide entertainment and conversation to guests at parties. The Ichiriki does not prepare food, but customers can order catering à la carte, which is delivered to the house. Guests can also be shown around the house and see various decorations, such as a miniature display of the forty-seven rōnin dating to around 1850.

== Architecture ==
Ichiriki is constructed in the traditional Japanese architectural style. The structure of the building is mostly wood, and is designed to protect the privacy of its patrons, with the interior gardens not visible from outside the complex. The building also features angled screens to prevent eavesdropping at walls.

== Cultural references to the Ichiriki ==
- The establishment is a major setting in Arthur Golden's fictional portrayal of a Gion geisha's life in Memoirs of a Geisha, though Golden himself never visited the teahouse.
- Ichiriki is a major setting in the bunraku play Kanadehon Chūshingura, depicting the story of the forty-seven rōnin.
- The play Ichiriki Teahouse centers around the plots against the shōgun formulated at the Ichiriki.
- Former geisha Sayo Masuda mentions it several times in her work Autobiography of a Geisha, stating that "The Mistress of the Ichiriki was only thirty-four or thirty-five, but she once had been a geisha herself and had suffered terribly to get where she was, so she was kind to us in all sort of ways".
