= Rande Gail Brown =

American writer, translator, and psychotherapist

Rande Gail Brown is an American writer, translator, and psychotherapist. She was one of the first women to graduate from Princeton University from which she holds a degree in East Asian Studies.

Rande is a founding board member and former Executive Director of the Tricycle Foundation, publisher of Tricycle: The Buddhist Review, America's leading Buddhist magazine. She is also president of East West Communications, a company that facilitates cultural understanding between Japan and the United States. A well-known translator of Japanese spiritual and cultural texts, Rande co-authored the New York Times bestseller Geisha, A Life with Mineko Iwasaki (Atria, 2002).

Rande is also a founding board member of the New York Zen Center for Contemplative Care, under whose auspices she trained as a Volunteer Chaplain and served at Beth Israel Medical Center in New York City. She received her Master of Social Work degree from New York University and is a licensed psychotherapist with a specific focus on the intersection of Buddhism, spirituality, and psychology. Rande trained at the William Alanson White Institute of Psychiatry, Psychoanalysis & Psychology in New York City, New York, where she is on the Faculty, Supervisor in the IPPP program, and Associate Editor of Contemporary Psychoanalysis.

As President of the Psychoanalytic Society of William Alanson White Institute, in 2021-2022 she organized the popular colloquia series “The Uncanny, Revisited, Transpersonal Communication in the Interpersonal Field”, which is currently being reprised in its entirety by the Confer Center in London. She is also on the Faculty of the Contemplative Studies Project of New York City. Rande is in private practice in Greenwich Village.
