= Ponto-chō =

Neighborhood in Kyoto, Japan

Coordinates: 35°00′29″N 135°46′16″E

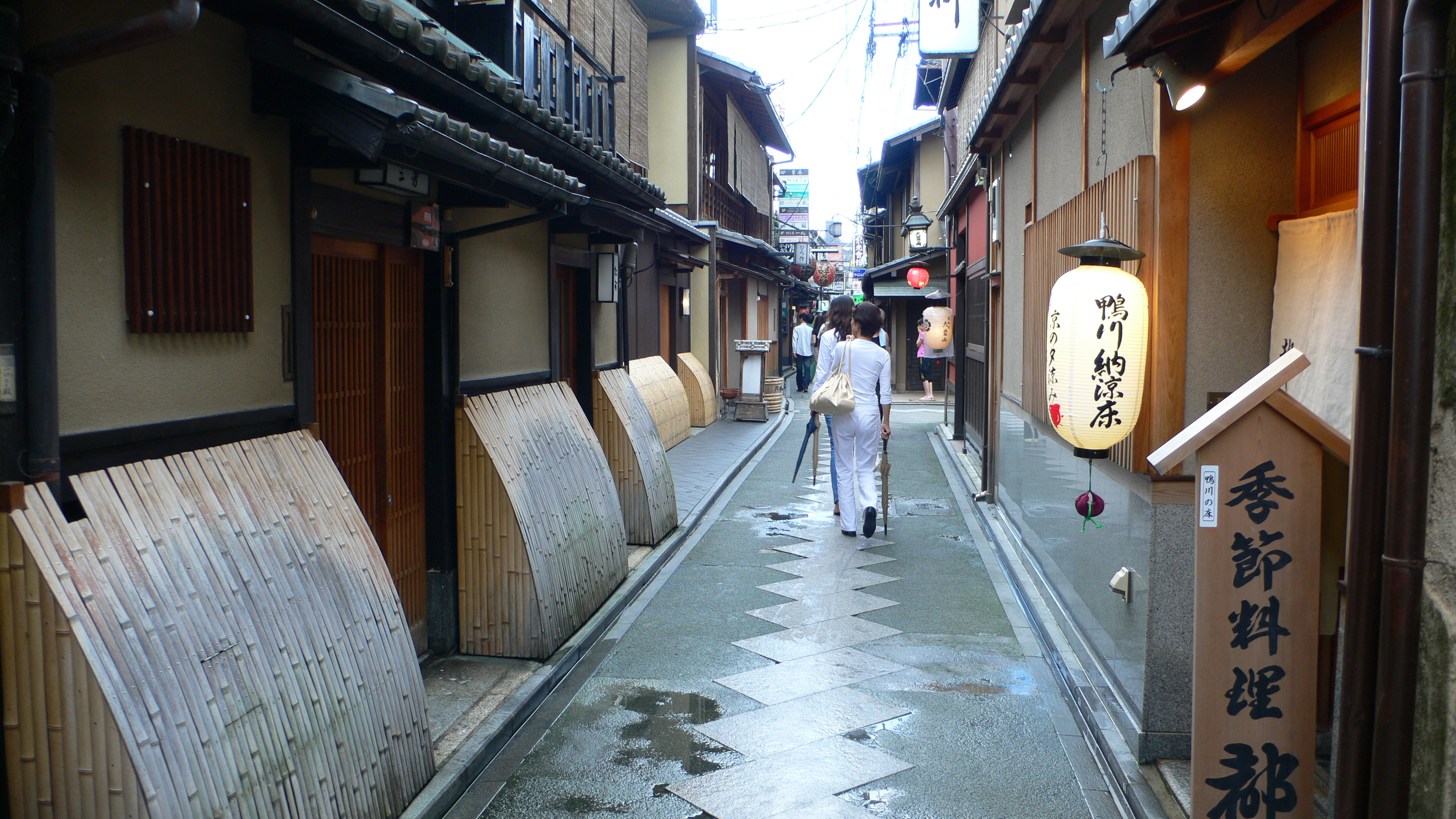
Ponto-chō in the morning

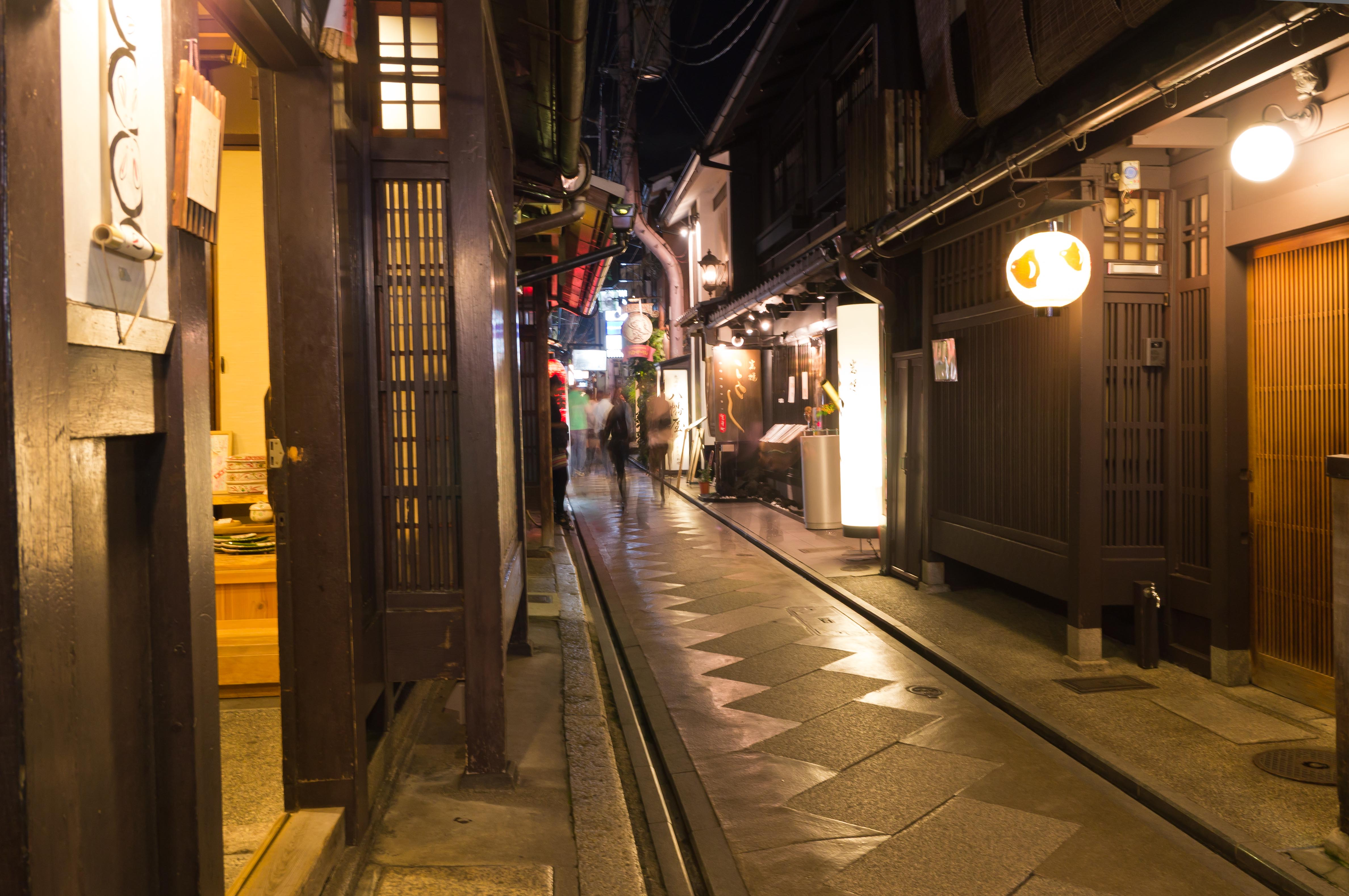
Ponto-chō at night

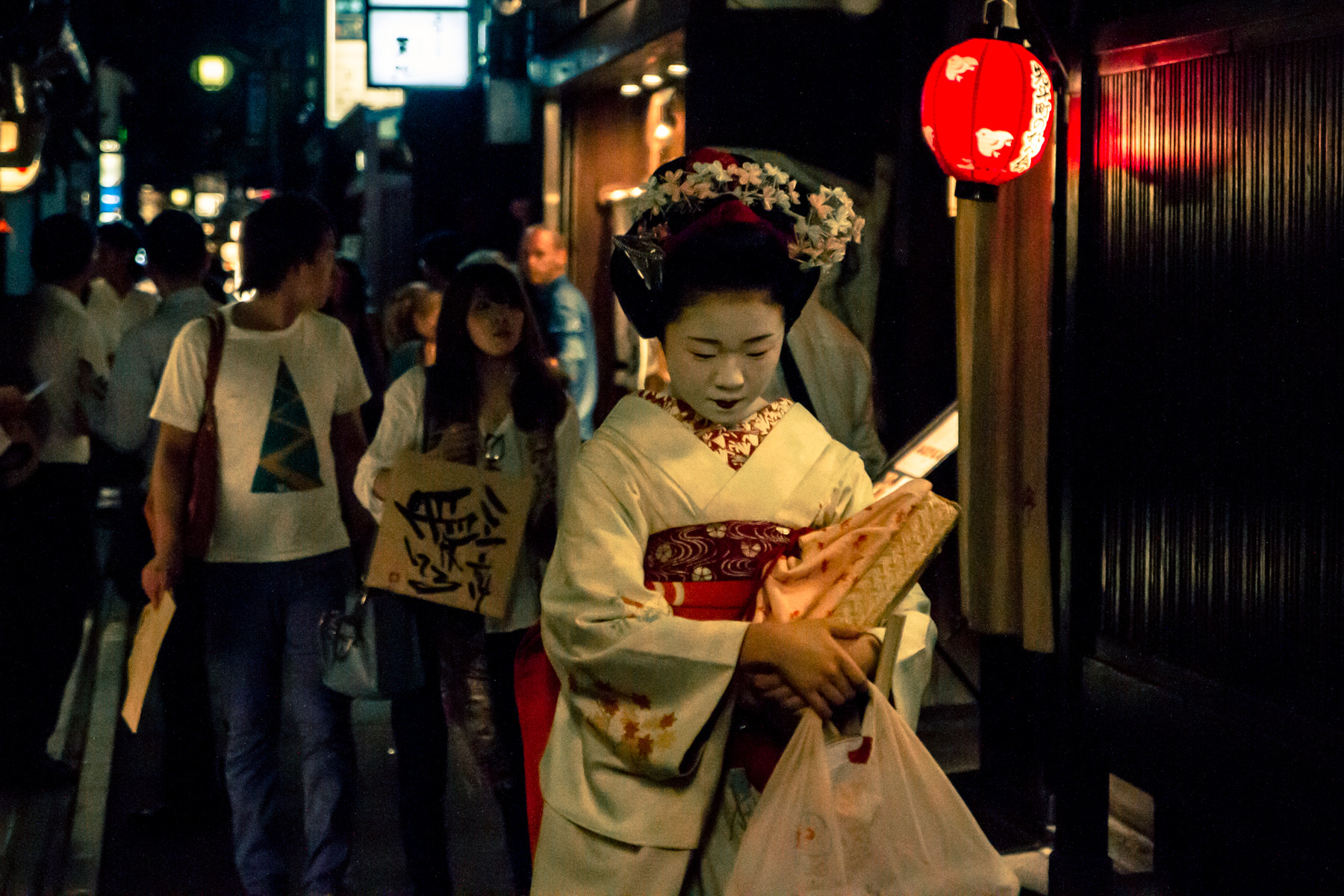
A maiko in Ponto-chō

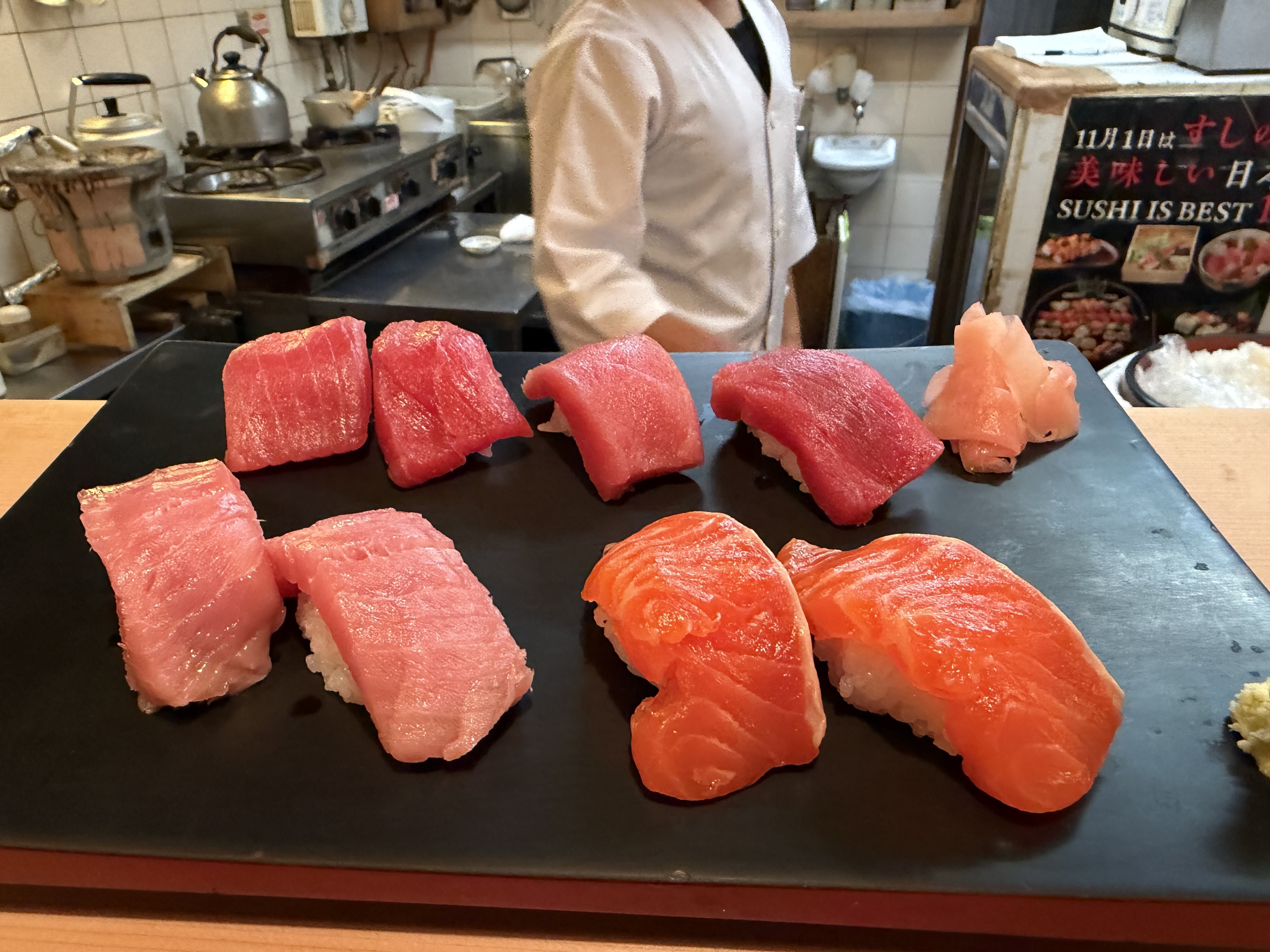
A plate of assorted nigiri from Yoshinosushi in Ponto-chō

Ponto-chō (先斗町) is a hanamachi district in Kyoto, Japan, known for its geiko and maiko, and is home to many of the city's okiya and traditional tea houses. Like Gion, Ponto-chō is famous for the preservation of forms of traditional architecture and entertainment.

== Etymology ==
The name "Ponto" is believed to come from the Portuguese word "ponte" (bridge), and is written in kanji used for their sound only (ateji). The Japanese word "-chō" means town, block or street.

== District ==
Ponto-chō as a district is for the most part constructed around a long, narrow alleyway, running from Shijō-dōri to Sanjō-dōri, one block west of the Kamo River. This location is also known as the traditional location for the beginning of kabuki as an art form, and a statue of kabuki's founder, Izumo no Okuni, stands on the opposite side of the river. The district's crest is a stylized water plover, or chidori.

== Cultural features ==
Geiko and maiko have existed in Ponto-chō since at least the 16th century, as have prostitution and other forms of entertainment. Today, the area, lit by traditional lanterns at night, contains a mix of exclusive restaurants — often featuring outdoor riverside dining on wooden patios — geisha houses and tea houses, bars, and cheap eateries.

The area is also home to the Ponto-chō Kaburenjō Theatre at the Sanjō-dōri end of the street. This theatre functions as a practice hall for geisha and maiko, and has functioned as the location for the annual Kamogawa Odori — a combination performance of traditional dance, kabuki-like theatre, singing and the playing of traditional instruments — since the 1870s.

In the 1970s, American anthropologist Liza Dalby visited Kyoto for a year as part of her doctoral studies into the institution of geisha in modern Japanese society, eventually unofficially becoming a geisha as part of her research. Dalby later wrote a well-received book, Geisha, about the experience.

== See also ==
- Gion
- Kamishichiken
- Miyagawacho
- Shimabara
