= Ochaya =

Place where geisha entertain clients

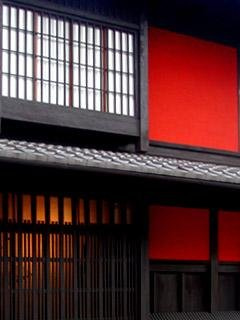
Entrance to the Ichiriki Chaya, one of the most famous tea houses where geisha entertain in Gion

In Japan, an ochaya (お茶屋, literally "tea house") is an establishment where patrons are entertained by geisha.

In the Edo period, chaya could refer to establishments serving tea and drinks (mizujaya (水茶屋)), offering rooms for rent by the hour (machiaijaya (待合茶屋)), or brothels (irojaya (色茶屋) in Osaka, hikitejaya (引手茶屋) in Edo). However, in the modern day, ochaya refers exclusively to the establishments within Kyoto in which geisha work and entertain their clients, though the term is sometimes used to describe all establishments used by geisha to entertain guests, irrespective of location.

Equivalent establishments in locations outside of Kyoto are known as ryōtei (料亭), meaning "restaurant", referring to a traditional Japanese-style restaurant where geisha may entertain.

== Terminology ==
Though the term ochaya literally means "tea house", the term follows the naming conventions of buildings or rooms used for Japanese tea ceremony, known as chashitsu (茶室, lit. "tea room"); as such, though tea is served at ochaya as an ordinary beverage, it is not, unlike teahouses and tearooms found throughout the world, its sole purpose.

When used as part of a name, the honorific prefix o- is not used in Japanese, and the plain chaya is used as a suffix, as in "Ichiriki Chaya". In English, this is not always observed, and terminology such as "Ichiriki Ochaya" is sometimes used. Ochaya are often referred to instead simply by their name, as in "(the) Ichiriki".

== Access ==
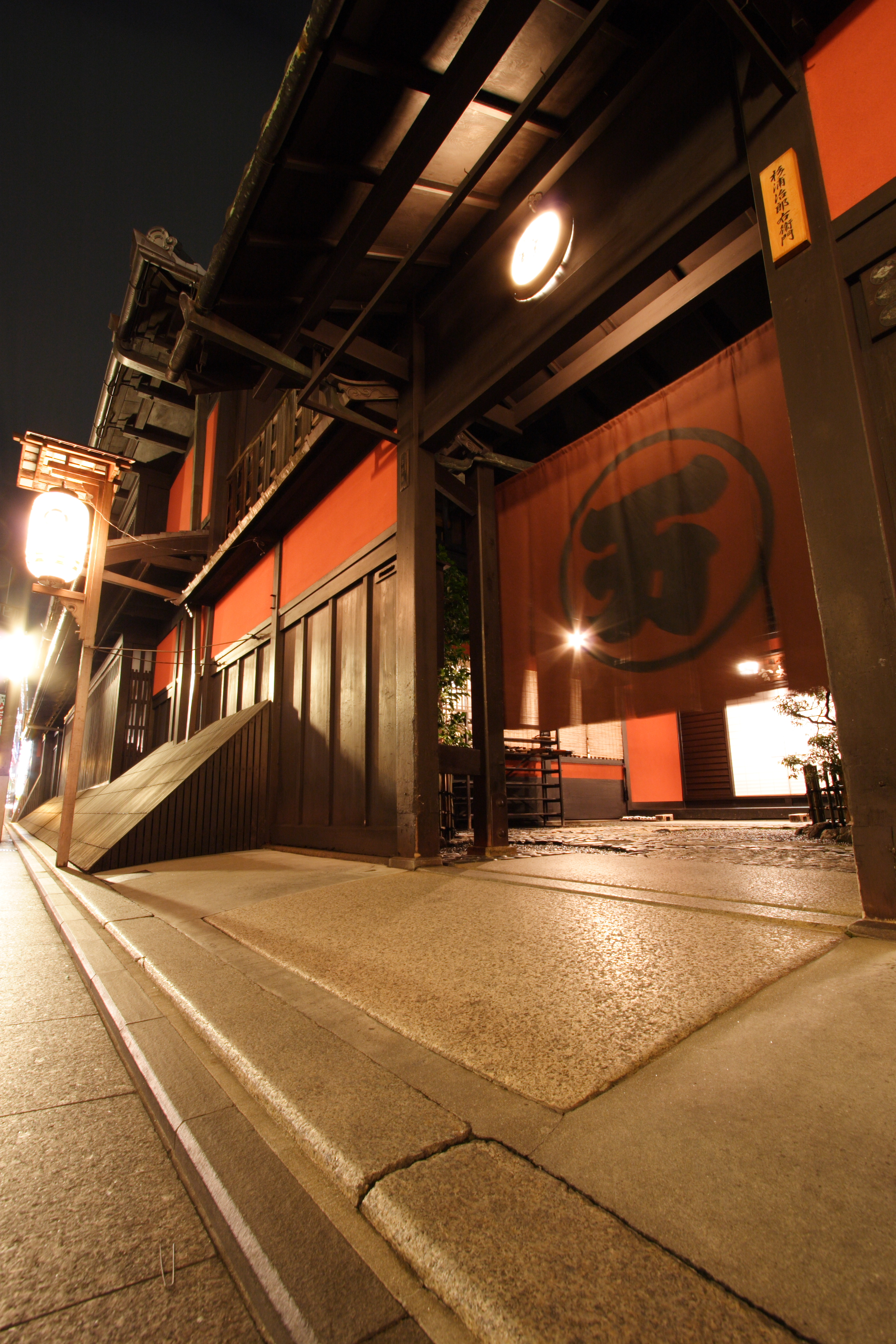
Ichiriki Chaya entrance

Ochaya are typically very exclusive establishments; with very rare exceptions, a person may only enter if they are already an established patron, or are accompanied by a patron, with reservations.

Relationships to ochaya can often be traced back generations, and are generally associated with a family or company. Switching ochaya is not generally possible, and even patronizing ochaya other than the one with which one is associated is considered a very serious breach of manners.

In exceptional circumstances, these restrictions are relaxed. For example, for a brief period of only a few nights in 2006, one ochaya in each of the five Kyoto geisha districts offered general access to a small number of tourists who were unaccompanied by patrons, as part of a tourism promotion program, at the request of the Kyoto City Tourist Association.

== Identification ==
Ochaya cater to a discreet clientele, and thus do not present a particularly conspicuous front, but nor are they particularly secretive as to their location. Ochaya are generally located on or near the main streets of their geisha district, and will generally have the name at the entrance, with an entrance curtain (暖簾, noren) and front garden in larger houses, which can be glimpsed from the street. In Kyoto, ochaya are licensed by the city, and all display a metal badge at the entrance reading "「京公許第〜号」「お茶屋」" (Kyoto public license #..., Ochaya).

== Design ==
As traditional establishments, ochaya occupy buildings exemplifying traditional Japanese architecture, most often town house (町家/町屋, machiya) style construction, particularly in Kyoto. Interiors will typically be tatami rooms, while exteriors may feature sheer walls (for privacy) or wooden lattices (格子, kōshi).

== Services ==
The main function of an ochaya is to provide a private space for entertainment by geisha (including apprentice geisha). Geisha are not affiliated with a particular teahouse, but are instead hired from the geisha house (okiya) they are affiliated with by the proprietress of the ochaya to provide entertainment, consisting of conversation, flirtation, pouring drinks, traditional games, singing, musical instruments, and dancing. Ochaya typically do not prepare food, but customers can order catering a la carte, which is delivered to the house; geisha districts typically have a variety of restaurants serving this trade.

== Examples ==
The most notable and famous ochaya is the Ichiriki Chaya in the Gion district of Kyoto, considered one of the most exclusive ochaya in Japan. The Ichiriki features as a major setting in Arthur Golden's fictional portrayal of a Gion geisha's life, Memoirs of a Geisha.

== See also ==
- Hanamachi
- Okiya
