= Miyagawa-chō =

Geisha district in Kyoto

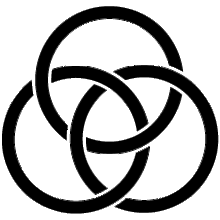
Miyagawa-chō symbol

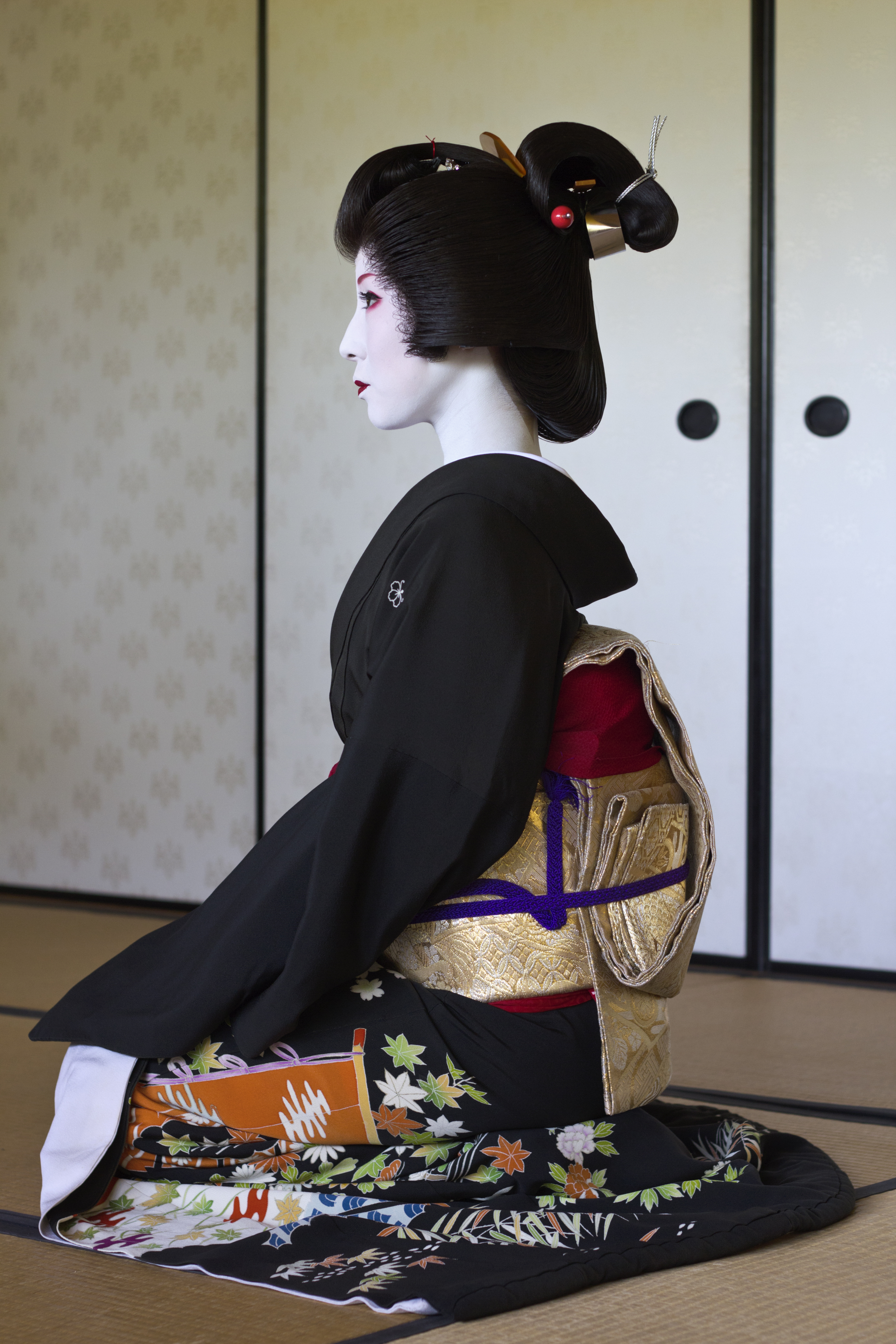
Geiko in Miyagawa-chō

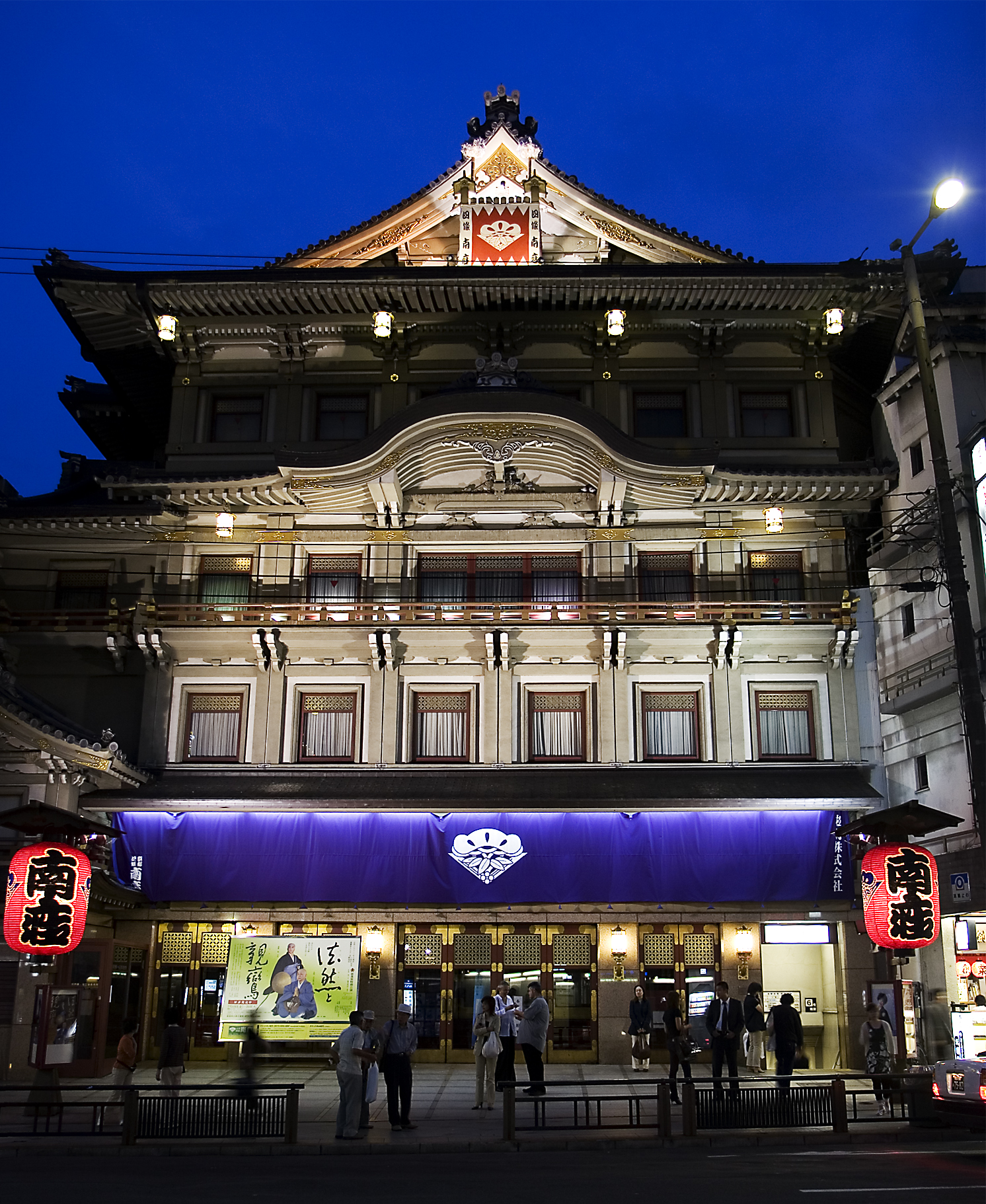
Minamiza Theater near Miyagawa-chō

Miyagawa-chō (宮川町) is one of the hanamachi (花街, "flower towns") or geisha districts in Kyoto. 'Miya-gawa' means "Shrine River", referring to the nickname of the Kamo River just south of Shijō. During the Gion Festival the mikoshi (divine palanquin) of Yasaka Shrine used to be purified in the waters of this river.

Miyagawa-chō trademark consists of three interlocked rings, symbolizing the unity of the shrine/temples, the townspeople, and the teahouses.

What is now Miyagawa-chō was a place where entertainers gathered. Kabuki was performed in many small theaters on the banks of the Kamo River. Some of the teahouses were even boats that operated in the river. As kabuki was just then developing into a mass entertainment spectacle as known today, the area was very popular and Miyagawa-chō quickly grew into a full town of teahouses. The association with kabuki has gone, but the Minami-za kabuki theatre of Kyoto still stands on its historical spot on the east bank of the Kamo River. Today, Miyagawa-chō has its own kaburenjō, or theater where geisha dances are performed.

== See also ==
- Kyōto hanamachi
- Gion, another district located just north of Miyagawa-chō
- Pontochō, another district on west side of Kamo River
