= Hanamachi =

Japanese geisha district

A hanamachi (花街, lit. 'flower town') is a district where geisha live and work in Japan. Each hanamachi typically has its own name, crest, and distinct geisha population, with geisha not typically working outside of their own district. Hanamachi usually contain okiya (geisha houses) and ochaya (teahouses where geisha entertain).

Historically, hanamachi could contain a high number of okiya and ochaya, and would also contain a kaburenjō (歌舞練所) as well – a communal meeting place for geisha, typically containing a theater, rooms where classes in the traditional arts could be held, and a kenban (registry office) who would process a geisha's pay, regulation of the profession, and other related matters.

Gion, a geisha district in Kyoto, also has a vocational school, called nyokoba. Many of the teachers there are designated as Living National Treasures.

== Yūkaku ==
Hanamachi were preceded by the registered red-light districts of Japan, known as yūkaku (ja:遊廓/遊郭). Three yūkaku were established in Japan in the early 1600s: Shimabara in Kyoto in 1640, Shinmachi in Osaka between 1624 and 1644, and Yoshiwara in Edo (modern-day Tokyo) in 1617. Yūkaku were originally a place of work for both yūjo (ja:遊女, lit. 'prostitute') and oiran (courtesans). Tayū, technically the highest rank of courtesan, also lived in the red-light districts; however, unlike oiran, they did not engage in sex work, and were instead renowned as upper-class entertainers prized for their training in the traditional arts, which typically began at an early age. Tayū were only engaged by men of the upper classes, and could choose which clients they wished to engage, unlike other courtesans.

Following the development of the geisha profession in the yūkaku in the mid-1700s, many geisha, working inside the yūkaku alongside yūjo and courtesans, began to compete with them; though the entertainment they offered was mostly (and in official terms, entirely) devoid from sex work, geisha instead offered companionship and entertainment to men at parties, and were commonly not bound to the same controlling contracts that many courtesans were.

Having developed from a previously-male profession of entertainers who performed at the parties of some yūjo, geisha were at times legally prevented from operating outside of yūkaku, despite also being legally prevented from appearing as, operating as and stealing clients from courtesans; as a result, many yūkaku went on to develop into hanamachi.

All three yūkaku are now defunct, both as courtesan districts and geisha districts, though tayū reenactors continue to practice the performing arts of upper-class courtesans in Shimabara, Kyoto, and some conventional sex work establishments continue to exist in Yoshiwara, Tokyo.

== Kyoto hanamachi ==
External image
- Map of Kyoto kagai

There are currently five active hanamachi in Kyoto, generally referred to as kagai in the local Kyoto dialect instead of hanamachi, and sometimes referred to collectively as the gokagai (五花街, "five flower towns"):

- Gion (separated as Gion Kōbu and Gion Higashi)
- Miyagawa-chō
- Kamishichiken
- Pontochō

As a hanamachi for geisha, the district of Shimabara is defunct; having previously formed part of the city's six districts (collectively referred to as the rōkkagai ("six flower towns")), when Shimabara's last geisha departed in the late 20th century, the district was considered defunct, despite the continuation of tayū within the district.

The geisha districts of Kyoto are primarily clustered around the Kamo River, from Sanjō Street (3rd Street) to Gojō Street (5th Street), particularly around Shijō Street – four of the five districts are in this area. Kamishichiken is separated from the others, being far to the northwest, while the defunct district of Shimabara is also located to the west; most districts are roughly centered around their respective rehearsal halls, known as kaburenjō (歌舞練場, lit. 'singing and dancing training space').

=== Traditions ===
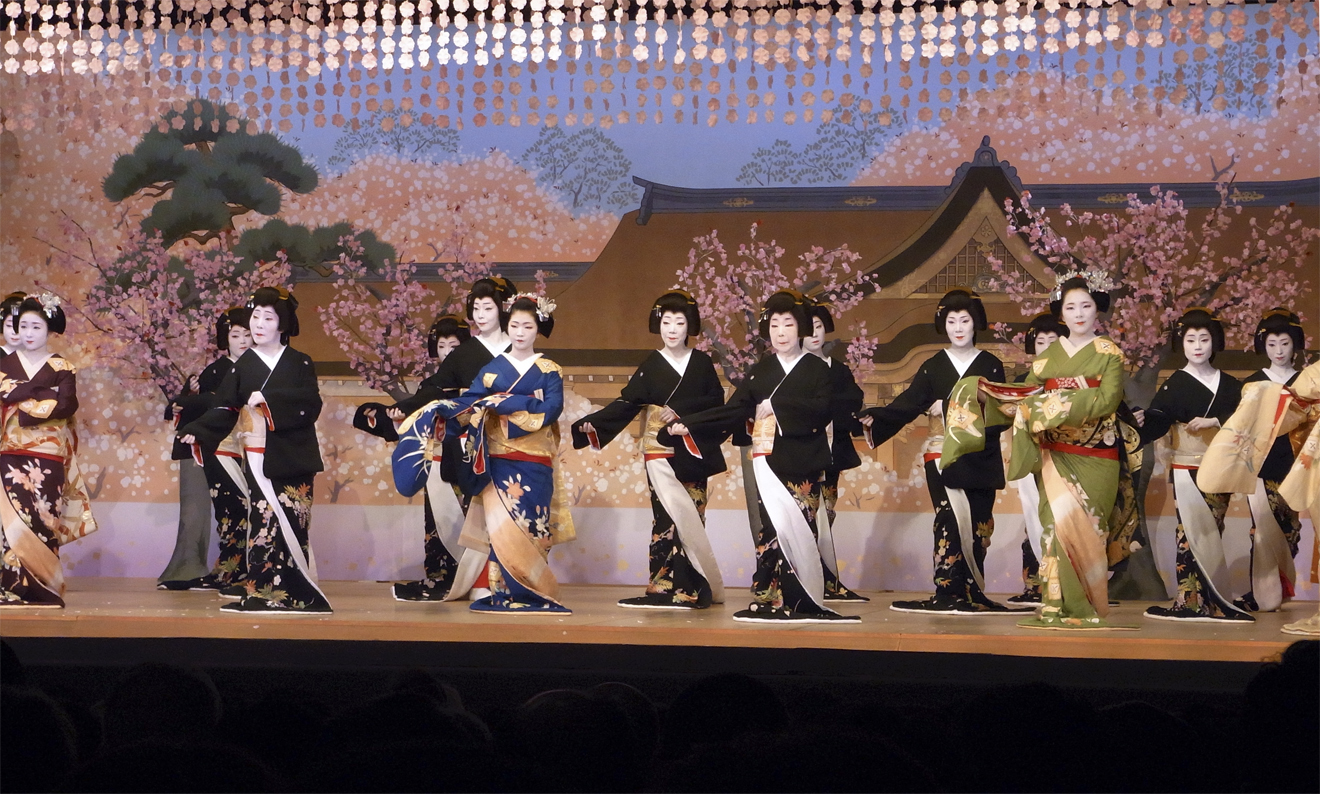
The Kitano Odori, a kabuki dance performed annually by the geisha of Kamishichiken

Each district has a distinctive crest (kamon or mon), which appears on geisha's kimono, as well as on lanterns.

A summer tradition around the time of the Gion Festival among the hanamachi of Kyoto is to distribute personalized uchiwa (団扇, flat fans) to favored patrons and stores that both maiko and geisha frequent. These feature a crest of the geisha house on the front, and the geisha's name on the back (house name, then personal name). These are produced by Komaru-ya Sumii (小丸屋 住井), and are known as Kyōmaru-uchiwa (京丸うちわ, Kyoto round uchiwa). Establishments such as bars that are particularly frequented by geisha often accumulate many of these fans, and typically display them in the summer months.

All the Kyoto hanamachi stage public dances annually, known as odori (generally written in the traditional kana spelling of をどり, rather than modern spelling of おどり), featuring both maiko and geisha. These also feature an optional tea ceremony (tea and wagashi served by maiko) before the performance. These are performed for several weeks, mostly in the spring – four hanamachi hold them in the spring with one (Gion Higashi) holding theirs in the autumn. Different districts started public performances in different years; the oldest are those of Gion Kōbu and Pontochō, whose performances started at the Kyoto exhibition of 1872, while others (Kamishichiken, Miyagawachō) started performing in the 1950s. There are many performances, with tickets being inexpensive, ranging from around 1500 yen to 4500 yen. The best-known is the Miyako Odori performed in Gion Kōbu, which is one of the two oldest and has the most performances.

The dances are as follows (listed in order of performance through the year):

- Kitano Odori (北野をどり) – Kamishichiken (since 1953), spring, varying dates, currently last week of March and first week of April
- Miyako Odori (都をどり) – Gion Kōbu (since 1872), all of April
- Kyō Odori (京をどり) – Miyagawa-chō (since the 1950s), first 2 weeks of April
- Kamogawa Odori (鴨川をどり) – Pontochō (since 1872), most of May
- Gion Odori (祇園をどり) – Gion Higashi, early November

The district of Shimabara previously produced the Aoyagi Odori (青柳踊) from 1873 to 1880.

There is also a combined show of all five districts, which is called "Five Geisha District Combined Public Performance" (五花街合同公演, gokagai gōdō kōen), or more formally "Kyoto's five geisha districts combined traditional theater special public performance" (京都五花街合同伝統芸能特別公演, Kyōto gokagai gōdō dentō geinō tokubetsu kōen). This takes place during the daytime on two days (Saturday and Sunday) on a weekend in late June (typically last or second-to-last weekend) at a large venue, and tickets are significantly more expensive than those for individual districts. Connected with this event, in the evening on these two days there are evening performances with kaiseki meals, either a combined event, or separate ones per district. This is known as the "Five Geisha Districts Evening" (五花街の夕べ, gokagai no yūbe), and is quite expensive (as is usual for kaiseki) and very limited availability; this has been held since 1994.

== Nara hanamachi ==
- Ganrin-in

== Tokyo hanamachi ==
- Shinbashi
- Akasaka
- Asakusa
- Yoshichō
- Kagurazaka
- Mukojima
- Omori Kaigan

== Hanamachi near Tokyo ==
- Hachiōji

== Areas historically renowned as hanamachi ==
- Torimori
- Shintomichō
- Fukagawa
- Maruyamachō
- Yanagibashi
- Nakano Shinbashi

== In Osaka ==
- Kita Shinchi
- Minami Shinchi
- Shinmachi

== In Kanazawa ==
Kanazawa's Geisha areas were most active between the periods of 1820–1830 and 1867–1954. Now referred to as the chayagai, the three districts continue to exist and often feature public performances during peak tourist seasons.

- Higashi Chaya Gai (eastern teahouse district)
- Nishi Chaya Gai (western teahouse district)
- Kazuemachi (the accountant's town)
