= Okiya =

Establishment to which a geisha is affiliated

An okiya (置屋) is the lodging house/drinking establishment with which a maiko or geisha is affiliated during her career as a geisha. The okiya is typically run by the "mother" (okā-san) of the house, who handles a geisha's engagements and the development of her skills, and funds her training through a particular teahouse. Though a geisha is legally required to be registered to an okiya in order to work, and may live there as a trainee, it is not a legal requirement for geisha to live within their okiya.

A geisha's engagements at parties, and her lessons in singing, traditional dance, musical instruments and tea ceremony are also booked through her okiya. An okiya and its attached teahouse typically has its own "branch" of art names linking its geisha and maiko together, usually through the use of a shared prefix; for example, many of the geisha trained at the Dai-Ichi teahouse in Pontochō have names that begin with Ichi-.

== Living arrangements ==
Many geisha, particularly those working in more traditional geisha communities such as those found in Kyoto, live within the okiya they are affiliated with, though some working in other areas of Japan – such as the geisha of Tokyo – are more likely to commute in from their own apartment. However, a geisha will still keep her kimono at the okiya, and will dress there every evening before attending parties and engagements. There may be more than one geisha or maiko living in an okiya at any given time, and the mother of the house may also be an active geisha herself; however, there are no requirements for an okiya to have any geisha at all in order to keep its license as an okiya. (Note: "At the time I questioned Mr. Watanabe [1974-5], the administrator of the Akasaka kenban, 158 licensed okiya were doing business in [the area]...some [okiya] has four or five geisha, some only one, and a few were holding onto their registration but currently had no geisha at all.")

== Financial arrangements ==
The financial arrangements of a geisha's affiliation with her okiya vary; a geisha may start her career by borrowing everything from her okiya, including room and board and her kimono, and may pay this back over time. Under this system, until a geisha's debt is paid off – a process that takes roughly two years through this arrangement – all of her tips and wages go to the okiya, who then give her an allowance in return. A geisha under this arrangement generally enters into it with an external guarantor, and requires the mother of the house to keep extensive and detailed records. Some okiya owners will not take geisha on under these terms, considering it to be too involved and too much work. (Note: "Oyumi [then-Vice President of the Shimbashi Geisha Association, Tokyo] did not take girls under this arrangement because it was too much bother. She was too busy to keep track of all the necessary calculations. The old system of forced debt...is illegal, but geisha houses are very sensitive to charges of that kind; they must therefore keep careful, detailed records of...the week-to-week monetary transactions [of a new geisha]. For its own protection, the okiya will usually require a girl to have an outside guarantor before it will accept her".)

Another arrangement may be that a geisha begins her career as an "independent" (jimae (自前, "oneself in front")) geisha, who buys her own kimono, chooses to live separately from the okiya, and pays only for the fee of affiliation to the house. Geisha who do not begin their career in this manner, but have paid off all of their debts, are also referred to as being jimae. (Note: "The other arrangement was to be an independent (jimae) geisha from the beginning. [A geisha] buys her own kimono and pays a fee to the okiya only for the privilege of affiliation. To live in the [okiya] or not is a separate decision, and she can simply pay room and board there if she does...A geisha could expect to make about 200,000 yen [in Shimbashi, Tokyo in 1974-5] a month...although for the first few years not much would be left over after expenses were met".)

== Owners ==
Okiya are usually owned and run by women, who are referred to as "mother" by the geisha and maiko affiliated with the house. These women are commonly former geisha themselves, and were typically raised as geisha by the previous owner of the okiya; when the owner of an okiya retires, she may name one of her natural daughters – as the daughters of geisha are often raised inside the community – or one of the geisha under her as the heir (atotori) of the house; in the case of the atotori not being related to the mother of the house, the heir is adopted as the mother's daughter (musume). Under this arrangement, a geisha's debts are absorbed by the okiya, with all the money she earns going to the establishment directly as the new owner and proprietor of the house following the permanent retirement or death of her adoptive mother.
