= Dayu =

Dayu or Da Yu may also refer to:

- Dayu, Banmauk, Sagaing Region, Burma
- Yu the Great (Chinese: 大禹; pinyin: Dà Yǔ), legendary monarch of the Xia Dynasty
- Da Yu ding, bronze ding vessel from the Chinese Zhou dynasty
- Softstar (Chinese: 大宇資訊; pinyin: Dàyǔ Zīxùn), a Chinese language video game developer and publisher

== Places in China ==
- Dayu County, in Ganzhou, Jiangxi
- Dayu Mountains between Guangdong and Jiangxi
- Dayu Subdistrict, Beijing, in Mentougou District, Beijing
- Dayu, Gansu, town in Zhouqu County, Gansu
- Dayu, Hebei, town in Fengfeng Mining District, Handan, Hebei
- Dayu, Jiyuan, town in Jiyuan, Henan
- Dayu, Ruzhou, town in Ruzhou, Henan
- Dayu, Jiangsu, town in Rudong County, Jiangsu
- Dayu Subdistrict, Yanchuan County, Shaanxi
- Dayu Subdistrict, Weifang, Shandong
- Dayu Township, in Lin County, Shanxi
- Dayu, Yangqu County, town in Yangqu County, Shanxi
- Dayu, Sichuan, town in Shehong, Sichuan
- Dayu Subdistrict, Kunming, Yunnan
- Dayu, Zhejiang, town in Cangnan County, Zhejiang
- Lantau Island (Chinese: 大嶼山; pinyin: Dà yǔ shān), largest island in Hong Kong

== Places in Iran ==
- Dayu, Ardabil, a village in Ardabil Province, Iran
- Dayu, Bushehr, a village in Bushehr Province, Iran

== See also ==
- Dayus (disambiguation)
- Tayu (disambiguation)
- Daxu (disambiguation)
