= Oiran =

Category of high ranking courtesan in Japanese history

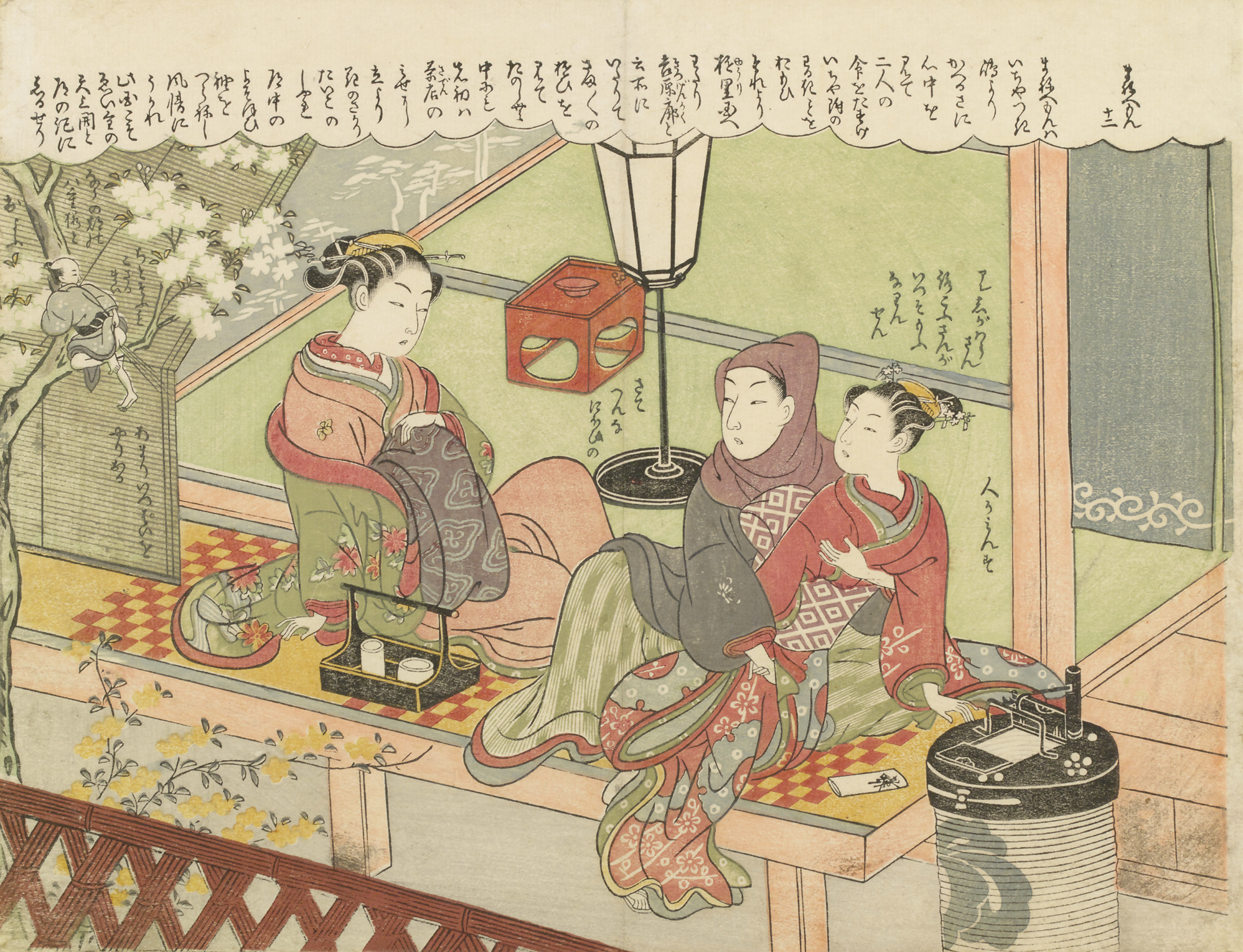
An oiran sitting with a client and an apprentice. Ukiyo-e print by Suzuki Harunobu (1765).

Oiran dancing, 2023

Oiran (花魁) is a collective term for the highest-ranking courtesans in Japanese history, who were considered to be above common prostitutes (known as yūjo (遊女, lit. 'woman of pleasure')) for their more refined entertainment skills and training.

The services of oiran were well known for being exclusive and expensive, with oiran typically only entertaining the upper classes of society, gaining the nickname keisei (lit. 'castle toppler') for their perceived ability to steal the hearts and match the wits of upper-class men.

Oiran were expected to be well versed in the traditional arts of singing, classical dance and music, including the ability to play the kokyū and the koto, and were also expected to converse with clients in upper class and formalised language. Though oiran by definition also engaged in prostitution, higher-ranking oiran had a degree of choice in which customers they took.

Oiran were divided into a number of ranks within this category, the highest rank of which were the tayū. They were considered to be set apart from other oiran due to their intensive training in the traditional arts and the fact that they lived and worked in Kyoto, the political capital of Japan, which remained the cultural heart of the country when the seat of political power moved to Tokyo.

The term oiran originated in Yoshiwara, the red light district of Edo in the 1750s, and is applied to all ranks of high level courtesans in historical Japan.

At the historic height of their profession, oiran were regarded as trendsetting and fashionable women. Many became celebrities both inside and outside of the pleasure quarters, and were commonly depicted in ukiyo-e woodblock prints and in kabuki theatre plays.

In the late 18th through 19th centuries, oiran fell out of fashion, while geisha became popular among the merchant classes for their simplified clothing, ability to play short, modern songs known as kouta on the shamisen, and their more fashionable expressions of contemporary womanhood and companionship for men, which mirrored the tastes of the extremely wealthy, but for lower class merchants, who constituted the majority of their patronage.

The popularity and numbers of oiran continued to decline steadily throughout the 19th century, before prostitution was outlawed in Japan in 1957. However, the tayū remaining in Kyoto's Shimabara district were allowed to continue practising the cultural and performing arts traditions of their profession, and were declared a "special variety" of geisha. In the present day, a handful of tayū, who do not engage in prostitution as part of their role, continue to perform in Kyoto, alongside a number of oiran reenactors elsewhere in Japan who perform in reenactments of the courtesan parades known as oiran dōchū.

== Etymology ==
The word oiran comes from the Japanese phrase "oira no tokoro no nēsan" (おいらの所の姉さん) which translates loosely to "the lady at our (my) place." When written in kanji, the word consists of two characters: 花, meaning "flower", and 魁 meaning "leader". Though only the highest ranking prostitutes of Yoshiwara were technically known as oiran, the term is now widely applied to all.

== Traditions ==
=== Traditional arts ===
Compared to yūjo, whose primary attraction was the sexual services they offered, oiran, and particularly tayū, were first and foremost entertainers. In order to become an oiran, a woman first had to be educated in a range of skills from a relatively young age, including sadō (Japanese tea ceremony), ikebana (flower arranging) and calligraphy. Oiran also learned to play the koto, shakuhachi, tsuzumi (hand drum), shamisen and kokyū. Clients expected oiran to be well read, able to converse and write with wit and elegance, and able to match them in intellect in conversation.

=== Names ===
Within the pleasure quarters, an oiran's prestige was based on her beauty, character, education and artistic ability, which was reflected in the number of ranks falling in the category of oiran. An oiran, unlike geisha or common prostitutes, could be promoted or demoted by the owner of her brothel, and commonly inherited a generational name (名跡, myōseki) upon gaining promotion to a higher rank; these names, exclusively the property of the brothel owner, typically carried the prestige of the person who held it previously, and brothel owners commonly chose only those of similar countenance and reputation to inherit them. Myōseki were written in kanji, and were typically more elaborate than the average woman's name of the time, holding meanings taken from poetry, literary history and nature; myōseki were rarely passed from one oiran directly down to their apprentice.

Oiran not considered to be high ranking or skilled enough to hold an inherited name would instead use a professional name considered elegant enough to be the name of a courtesan; these were typically pseudonyms taken to either protect one's identity or to promote the brothel's image, and were likely to be slightly more elaborate than the average woman's name. These names, alongside the names of both kamuro and shinzō (child attendants and apprentice courtesans respectively) were written in hiragana.

=== Appearance ===
The appearance of oiran was markedly different from that of both geisha and the average woman, reflecting the upper class tastes and expectations of their customers; by the height of their profession at the beginning of the Edo period, oiran wore upwards of eight large kanzashi (hair ornaments), typically made from tortoiseshell, silver, gold and gemstones, in their large, elaborate and heavily waxed hairstyles; these hairstyles, all with different names and meanings, were worn to represent different ranks, seasons and occasions.

An oiran's outfit consisted of a number of layered kimono; the outermost kimono would usually be a heavily decorated silk brocade garment known as the uchikake, which would feature a heavily padded hem. Though uchikake were also worn by noblewomen and, towards the end of the Meiji period, began to be worn by some brides, the uchikake worn by oiran were far more excessive and loud. These uchikake featured elaborate, traditional and auspicious designs, such as dragons, butterflies, arabesque rondels, pine, plum and bamboo, woven and embroidered in heavy gold and silver thread.

This would be worn unbelted over the top of the underkimono, which featured a patterned design only on the lower skirt, and resembled a juban (underkimono; part of kimono underwear) otherwise. The ensemble was belted with an obi tied at the front. During the Edo period, this obi became both wider and stiffer, adding weight and discomfort. Oiran became known for wearing a specific style of obi known as the manaita obi (lit. 'cutting board obi'), which presented a large, flat surface on which large designs would be decorated.

When parading or otherwise walking, oiran wore koma geta – 20 cm (7.9 in) tall paulownia wood clogs with three "teeth". Though lightweight for their size, these would prevent an oiran from taking anything other than small, slow footsteps when walking; oiran would thus walk in koma geta with a sliding, figure of 8 (suri-ashi) step, with two manservants (known as wakaimono) assisting her. Oiran generally did not wear tabi socks, with her bare foot considered to be a point of eroticism in her outfit. In total, a formal parade outfit worn by an oiran could weigh in excess of 20 kg (44 lb), often weighing as much as 30 kg (66 lb), (Note: In this video, the Shochiku Costume Company presents a modern reproduction costume for the role of Agemaki, a courtesan in the play Sukeroku. Though kabuki costumes are exaggerated, the costumes used for courtesans are highly similar to those used by oiran at the time (Edo period), making the techniques, decoration and fabrics used highly similar, if not entirely, and reliable as a resource for what oiran actually wore.) and would require great assistance to put on.

=== Ranks ===
The highest rank of courtesan was that of tayū (太夫), followed by kōshi (格子). Unlike courtesans of lower rank, tayū had sufficient prestige to refuse clients. Their high status also made the services of tayū extremely pricey – a tayū's fee for one evening was between one ryo and one ryo, three bu, well beyond a laborer's monthly wage and comparable to a shop assistant's annual salary.

Though many courtesans could be registered in one area, extremely few reached tayū status; a guidebook published in 1688 listed the contemporary numbers of high-ranking courtesans in comparison to all the courtesans listed in one area:

- 13 tayū were registered in Shimabara out of 329 registered courtesans
- 7 tayū were registered in Shinmachi out of 983 registered courtesans
- 3 tayū were registered in Osaka and Yoshiwara out of 2,790 registered courtesans

A Yoshiwara guidebook published in 1792 listed the six extant ranks of oiran, including tayū and kōshi, who had, by the time of the guidebook's publication, been dormant, with no courtesans in these roles in Yoshiwara, for 30 years:

1. Tayū
2. Kōshi
3. Yobidashi Tsukemawarashi
4. Sancha
5. Tsukemawarashi
6. Zashikimochi

In 1761, the last tayū of Yoshiwara retired, marking the end of the tayū and kōshi ranks in that pleasure quarter, though both tayū and kōshi continued to work in Kyoto and Osaka. The word oiran therefore appeared in Yoshiwara as a polite term of address for any remaining woman of courtesan rank.

== History ==
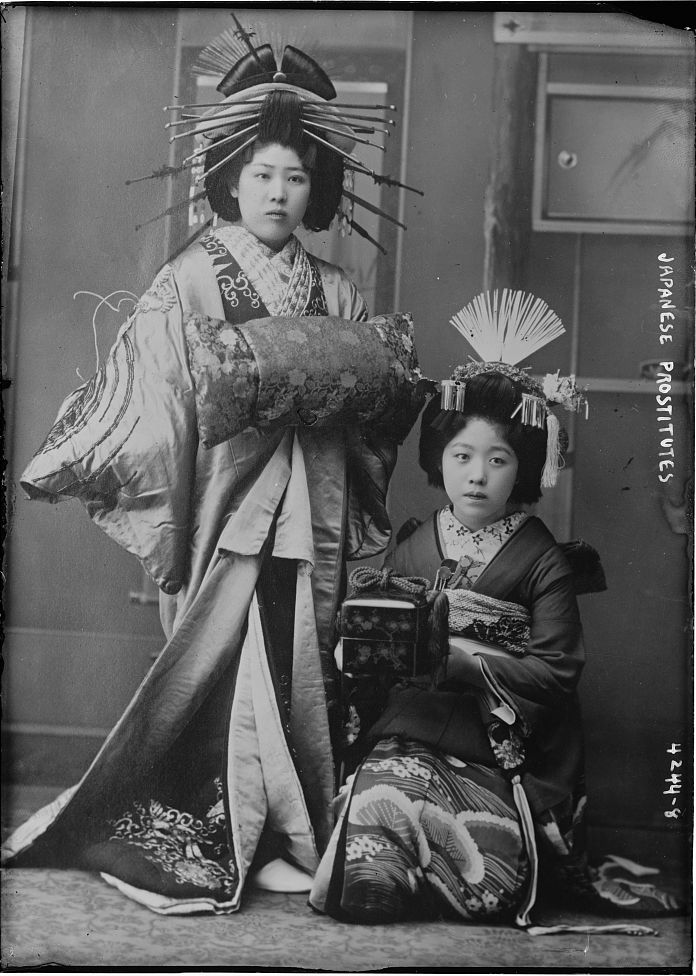
Picture of oiran in 1917

=== Rise to prominence ===
The profession of oiran arose in the early Edo period (1600–1868), following the introduction of laws restricting brothels to bounded pleasure quarters known as yūkaku (遊廓/遊郭, lit. 'playground') in roughly 1600, sometimes restricting brothels to literal walled-in districts. These quarters were often placed at some distance from the centre of the attached town or city, and the legal status and location of these districts changed on a number of occasions throughout the following centuries; on occasion, some were closed and their inhabitants sent to either live or work in another, larger red light district.

The three best-known districts historically were Shimabara in Kyoto (which also housed geisha until the 1970s), Shinmachi in Osaka and Yoshiwara in Edo (present day Tokyo). Over time, these districts rapidly grew into large and self contained neighbourhoods, containing a number of different forms of entertainment outside of prostitution including performances and festivals. Geisha – whose profession came into existence in the late 18th century – also occasionally worked within these districts, as edicts passed at various times restricted them from working outside of officially designated red light areas.

Outside of their physical presentation, the traditional aesthetics of the oiran and their attire bled into other aspects of the Edo period; within Yoshiwara, oiran eventually became the main source of entertainment, performing and entertaining at parties for guests. Scholar Jonathan Clements emphasised the striking presence of the oiran outside of their quarters, where a parading oiran's slow movements, brightly coloured and layered clothing, and lacquered hair provided a source of titillation for "the implications of Edo life [to be] so devoid of women." As a larger than life figure, historical accounts of the oiran recall the transferral of respectable house names as tangible products for potential clients, as well as signifiers of rank for established providers. This resulted in a widespread desire for anonymity for the mostly male population within Yoshiwara. Specialized products, such as kasa hats, medicinal intervention, and the newly developed medium of kabuki encompassed the centricity of the red-light district economy, while also supporting anonymity of its patrons. Thus, the mythical persona for the oiran did not only extend to physical interactions with her, but embodied one's journey through Yoshiwara itself. Outside of prostitution and the arts, the aesthetic reverence utilised to distinguish different classes of the oiran became a vehicle for other means of aesthetic expression.

This had a profound impact on the economy, while also reflecting a point of contention between the upper and lower classes of Edo. Yoshiwara, known as "the place without night", represented one of the new places in which "high" culture was able to mingle with that of the lower classes, forging a new aesthetic environment within Edo society alongside their mingling. Another nickname for the Yoshiwara was "ukiyo", a Buddhist word that meant suffering world, which, when written in new characters, came to mean "floating world". This would also later influence the creation of ukiyo-e woodblock prints. Laura W. Allen, the curator of Japanese art at the Asian Art Museum describes the aesthetic intervention as "ignoring the problems that might have existed in a very strictly regulated society and abandoning yourself, bobbing along on the current of pleasure."

=== Decline ===
Because of their isolation, the rigidity of their contracts as courtesans – which often ran for 10–15 years before ending their involvement with the profession – and their inability to leave the pleasure districts, oiran became steadily more traditional, outdated and ritualised, further and further removed from popular society and bound by their strict rules of etiquette, behaviour and speech. This, combined with their relative financial inaccessibility to most people, created a vacuum of entertainment for the rising merchant classes, whose relatively high wealth and relatively low social status left them unable to hire oiran, thus leading to the decision to patronise the greatly more accessible and less expensive geisha instead.

Over time, oiran also lost their celebrity status in wider society, and came in part to be seen less as highly cultured courtesans reflecting formal, high class standards of speech and appearance, and more as caged women unable to leave the pleasure districts and chained to the debts they owed to their brothel. The preservation of the appearance of oiran had also not reflected changes in fashion – as the profession of geisha had evolved and become increasingly popular, the authorities had sought to clamp down on the profligate and wealthy tastes of the merchant classes, leading to a number of dress edicts that changed popular aesthetics and led to the rise of subdued and cultivated aesthetics such as iki, which oiran categorically did not reflect or resemble.

Similarly, the entertainment that oiran offered had mostly remained unchanged since generations of courtesans previous. Though oiran played the shamisen, they did not play the popular and contemporary tunes composed for it, and instead stuck to longer ballads such as nagauta, which had refined, but restrained, lyrical content. This was in contrast to the kouta (lit. 'little songs') favoured and sung by geisha, whose lyrical content was often heartfelt and honest.

=== Competition with geisha ===
In the years that oiran declined, the geisha profession was born and grew increasingly stronger, contributing in part, if not in majority, to this decline.

Geisha were, officially-speaking, considered to be a relatively low-class form of entertainment, and as such, were not patronised by the upper classes, who were officially supposed to patronise tayū instead; however, during the Edo period, geisha came to represent the tastes of the merchant classes, whose low social status and high financial freedom left them free of social obligations to uphold the status of a samurai family that men of the upper classes were commonly beholden to.

As the merchant classes throughout Edo-period society grew in wealth and profligacy, they became the main source of income for geisha, who represented social and financial accessibility in a way that oiran did not. Geisha were cheap to patronise, informal to converse with, required few introductions before entertaining a customer and both played and sang the most popular songs of the time. Through various dress edicts aimed at controlling the merchant classes and thus preserving the appearances and social status of the upper classes, extravagant or obvious displays of wealth had been outlawed and driven underground, bringing aesthetics such as iki (simple, chic elegance) into popularity, which geisha came to both represent and champion. A geisha's loyalties were also held to be more true, as geisha could choose whom they wished to entertain, and geisha became the subject of many popular romantic stories.

Though geisha also worked within the pleasure districts that oiran did – at times forbidden to work outside of them – as the profession developed, laws regarding the separation of the two professions were passed. This, over time, ironically led to exaggerate and exacerbate the differences between geisha and oiran, heightening the popularity of the former and leading to the eventual destruction of the latter. Geisha were forbidden to dress elaborately, in the manner of oiran, and were not allowed to sleep with their customers. Geisha were registered at a separate registry office, and if an oiran accused a geisha of stealing a customer, she would be fully investigated, with the potential to be forbidden from working if found guilty.

Though geisha and oiran were likely to be at least in part indentured to their houses, geisha were not considered to be the same kind of physical property that oiran were considered to be by their employers. Though oiran were unable to leave their pleasure quarters and could be, if not in the highest ranks, forced to entertain whichever customers the head of her brothel demanded she entertain, geisha were allowed to both leave their houses and choose which patrons she wished to entertain, leading to the rise of adages comparing the loyalties of an oiran with square eggs, the punchline being that neither were things that existed. Though many geisha went into debt or held at least some debt with their okiya, few found themselves in the same situation of financial domination and ownership that oiran were almost entirely bound to.

=== Later years (1850–1957) ===
Towards the end of the Edo period, oiran continued to dwindle in popularity as the geisha grew in numbers, accessibility, and appeal. By the beginning of the Meiji period, official attitudes towards legalized prostitution within Japan had changed owing to the country's increasing international presence. Towards the end of the 19th century, geisha had replaced oiran as the entertainer and companion of choice for the wealthiest in Japanese society, with the central appeal of oiran having grown increasingly remote from everyday life.

Oiran continued to see clients within the old pleasure quarters, but were no longer at the cutting edge of fashion, and during the years of World War II, when any show of luxury was heavily clamped down upon, the culture surrounding oiran suffered even further, being dealt the final blow in 1957 by the Anti-Prostitution Law – after which the profession of courtesan (excluding the performance arts of tayū) became illegal.

== Modern oiran and tayū ==
=== Tayū ===
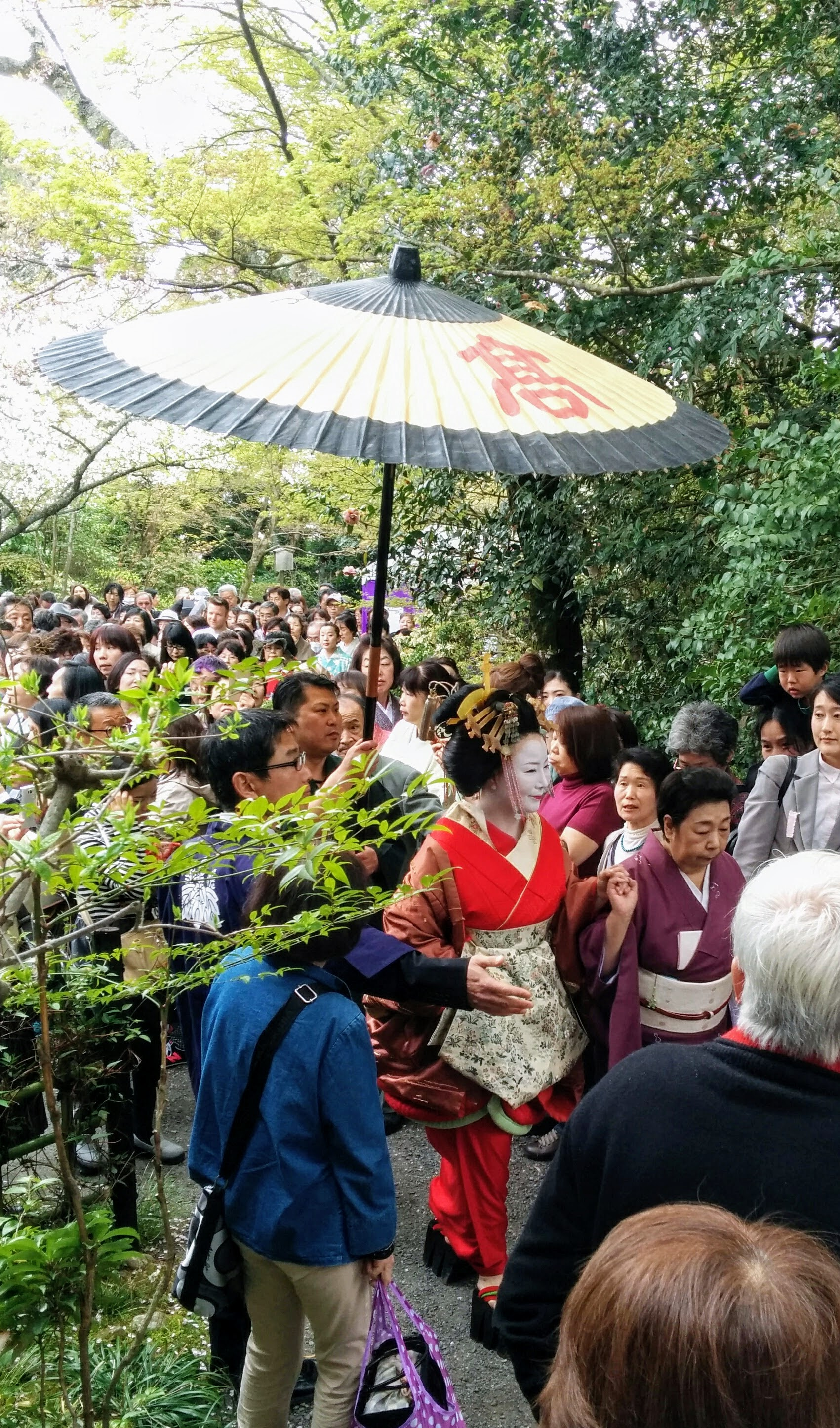
The modern-day tayū Kisaragi of the Wachigaiya okiya of Shimabara, Kyoto on parade

Tayū continue to entertain in a similar manner to geisha, with fewer than five tayū left in modern-day Kyoto. The last remaining tayū house is located in Shimabara, which lost its official status as a hanamachi for geisha in the late 20th century. However, some still recognize Shimabara as a hanamachi, with the number and activities of tayū slowly growing. The few remaining women still currently practising the arts of the tayū, without the sexual aspect, do so as a preservation of cultural heritage rather than as a profession or lifestyle.

=== Oiran ===
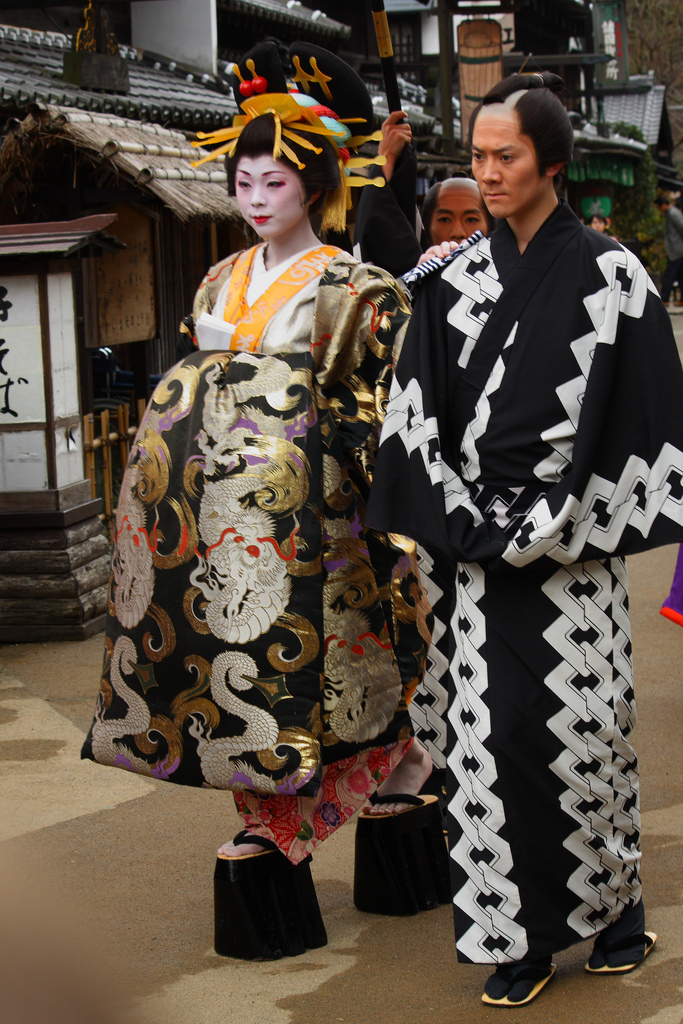
An actress dressed as an oiran in parade wearing distinctive high platform shoes

The Bunsui Sakura Matsuri Oiran Dōchū is an annual event held every April in Bunsui, Niigata Prefecture (now part of the city of Tsubame). The parade, which takes place in spring, historically re-enacts the walk made by top courtesans around their district in honour of their guests. The modern parade features three women dressed as oiran in full traditional attire with approximately 70 accompanying servants. The oiran, who are named Shinano, Sakura, and Bunsui, walk with the distinctive slow gait of wearing koma geta. Due to the event's popularity in Japan, organizers are often inundated with applications to be part of the parade as one of the three oiran or as a servant. Dōchū is a shortened form of oiran-dōchū, it is also known as the Dream Parade of Echigo (Echigo no yume-dōchū).

The Ōsu Street Performers' Festival is an event held around Ōsu Kannon Temple in Nagoya yearly around the beginning of October. The highlight of this two-day festival is the slow procession of oiran through the Ōsu Kannon shopping arcade. Thousands of spectators crowd the shopping streets on these days to get close enough to photograph the oiran and their retinue of male bodyguards and entourage of apprentices (young girls in distinctive red kimono, wearing oshiroi (white face paint) and loose, long black hair).

An oiran dōchū parade is held in the Minamishinagawa district near Aomono-Yokochō, Shinagawa every September.

== See also ==
- Geisha
- Kisaeng
- Prostitution in Japan
- Sing-song girls
- Tawaif
- Geji
