= Dayo (disambiguation) =

Dayo: Sa Mundo ng Elementalia is a Philippine animated film.

Dayo may also refer to:

- Dayo, Iran
- Day-O (The Banana Boat Song)
- Dayo (given name), a Yoruba given name

== People with the surname ==
- Issoufou Dayo (born 1991), Burkinabé footballer

== See also ==
- Daio (disambiguation)
- Joseph Dayo Oshadogan, Italian footballer of Nigerian origin
