= Taiyu =

Taiyu may refer to:

- Taiwanese Hokkien, a variety of Southern Min Chinese spoken in Taiwan
- Tiyong (Japanese: taiyū), a concept in East Asian Buddhism
- Taiyū, Akita, a former village in Japan
- Taiyū-ji, a Buddhist temple in Osaka Prefecture, Japan

== People and fictional characters with the given name ==
- Wang Daiyu (Wade–Giles: Wang Tai-yü; c. 1570–1660), Chinese Muslim scholar
- Lin Daiyu (Wade–Giles: Lin Tai-yu), character in the 18th-century novel Dream of the Red Chamber

== See also ==
- Languages of Taiwan
- Tayu (disambiguation)
- Yutai County, Shandong, China
