= Dayus =

Dayus may refer to:

- Dayus (leafhopper), a genus of insects in the family Cicadellidae
- Dayus, a genus of polychaete worms in the family Histriobdellidae; synonym of Steineridrilus
- Dayus, a genus of crustaceans in the family Gynodiastylidae; synonym of Jennidayus
- Kathleen Dayus (1903–2003), an English author

== See also ==
- Dayu (disambiguation)
