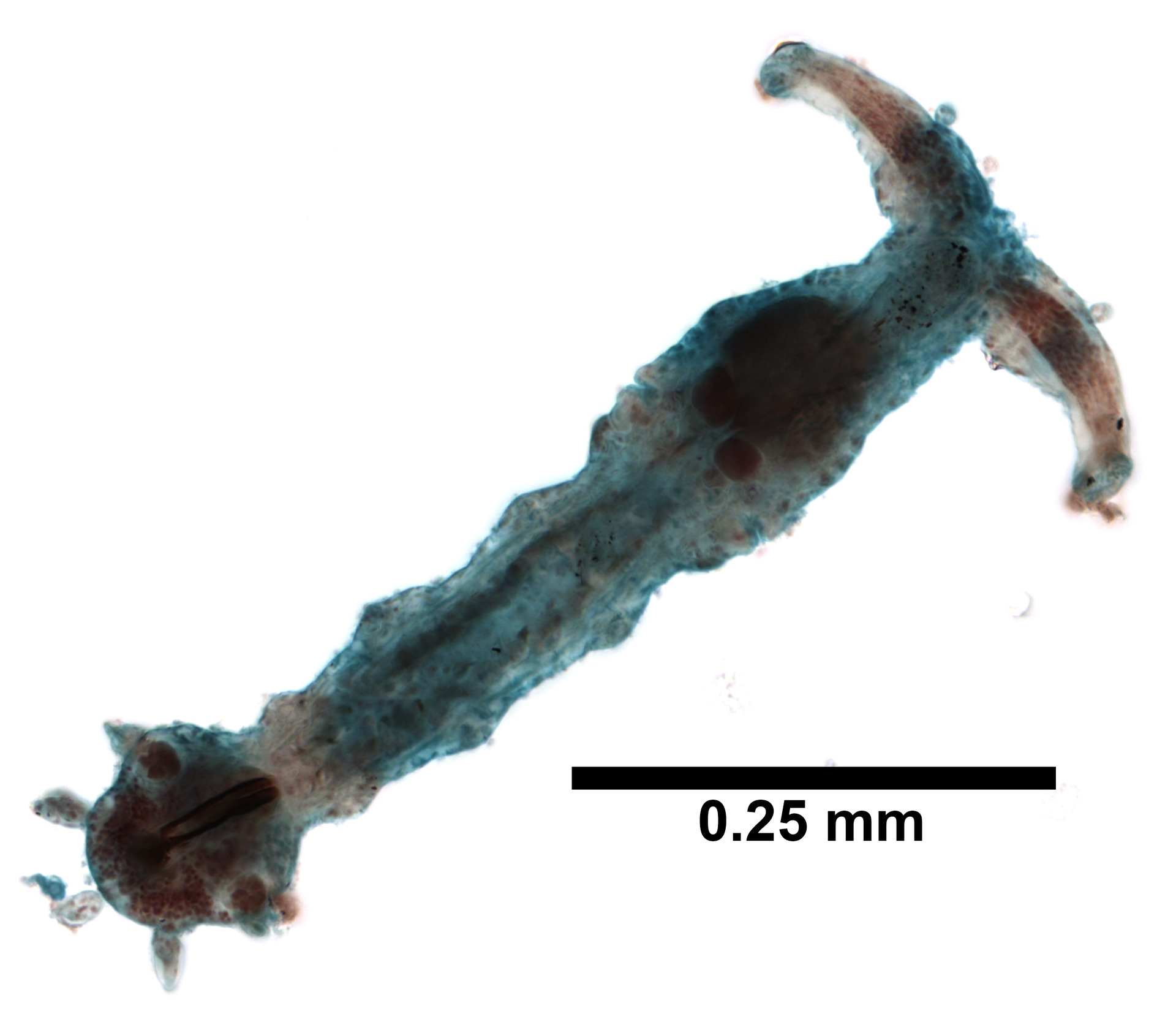

Scientific classification
- Kingdom: Animalia
- Phylum: Annelida
- Class: Polychaeta
- Order: incertae sedis
- Family: Histriobdellidae

= Histriobdellidae =

Family of annelids

Histriobdellidae is a family of annelids belonging to the order Eunicida.

Genera:

- Histriobdella Van Beneden, 1858
- Histriodrilus Foettinger, 1884
- Steineridrilus Zhang, 2014
- Stratiodrilus Haswell, 1900
