= Tayū =

Highest class of traditional female performer in Japan

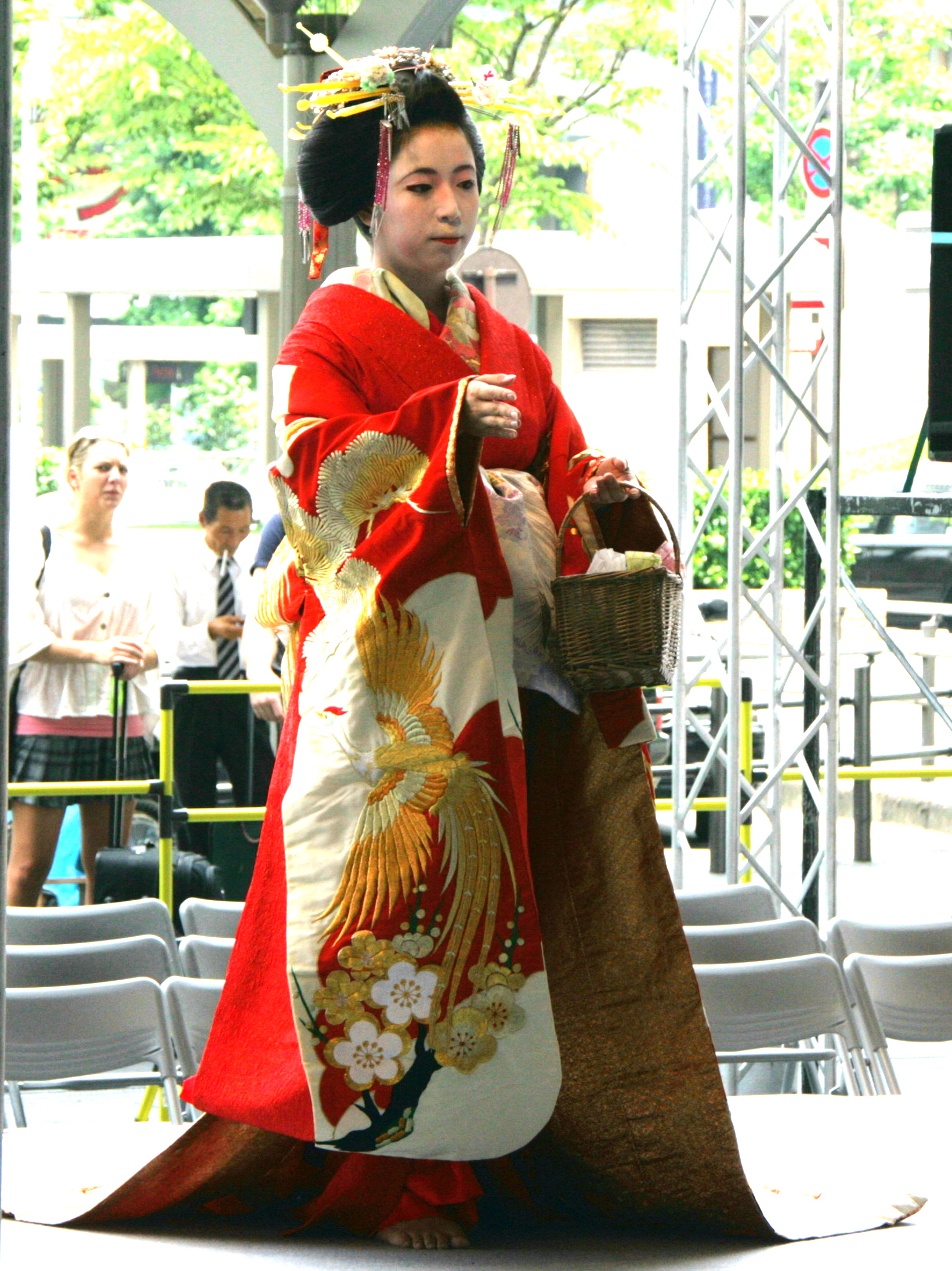
One of the tayū from the Wachigaiya okiya in the Shimabara district of Kyoto

Tayū (太夫) were the highest rank of female entertainers in early modern Japanese licensed quarters. Tayū were distinguished historically from other courtesans (yūjo; women of pleasure) and entertainers (maiko, geisha/geiko) by their intensive training in numerous traditional artforms from a young age. The prestige this education conferred on them allowed them to refuse clients. They were the only entertainers to attend the Imperial banquets.

Tayū were known for their training in Japanese tea ceremony, kōdō, ikebana, Japanese calligraphy, poetry, dance, singing, and the playing of traditional instruments, such as the koto.

== History ==
Tayū differed from lower ranks of oiran by the social class of their customers and the services they offer. Traditionally, tayū catered for the uppermost echelons of society, including the nobility and the imperial court. Tayū were recognised as a group in the beginning of the Edo period. Due to the limited size of their clientele, they were never numerous; during their peak there were approximately 40 tayū working in Kyoto in the Shimabara district.

After the outlawing of prostitution in 1957 tayū continued practicing the cultural and performing arts traditions of their profession in Shimabara and are considered a "special variety" of geisha.

The most famous tayū in history was Yoshino tayū (吉野太夫), who lived in the 17th century. Trained from the age of 7, she quickly mastered the many arts required to be a tayū, and made her debut at the age of 14, immediately becoming a sensation. Yoshino was well known for her beauty, skill and erudition. Yoshino is buried in the Jōshō-ji temple in Kyoto. Every year on the second Sunday in April, near the anniversary of her death, there is a procession of tayū to the temple, where a ceremony is held.

== Appearance ==
While entertaining, tayū wear elaborate kimono and hair ornaments weighing more than 2 kg (4.4 lb). Unlike modern-day oiran and geisha, but similarly to some apprentice geisha, they do not use wigs for their traditional hairstyles, but instead use their own hair.

Tayū wear white face makeup and blacken their teeth. Tayū are accompanied by an older female attendant and two kamuro (young girls wearing red livery bearing the tayū's name).

When outdoors, tayū wear distinctive extremely high platform sandals, which require a special mode of walking in order to look elegant, and also an attendant for support. This and many other aspects of the tayū's appearance were copied by the oiran, most notably in the oiran-dōchū, a procession where the oiran processes to meet a customer.

== See also ==
- Tayu (disambiguation)
