= Jōkan-ji =

Buddhist temple in Toyoko

Coordinates: 35.7308°N 139.7927°E

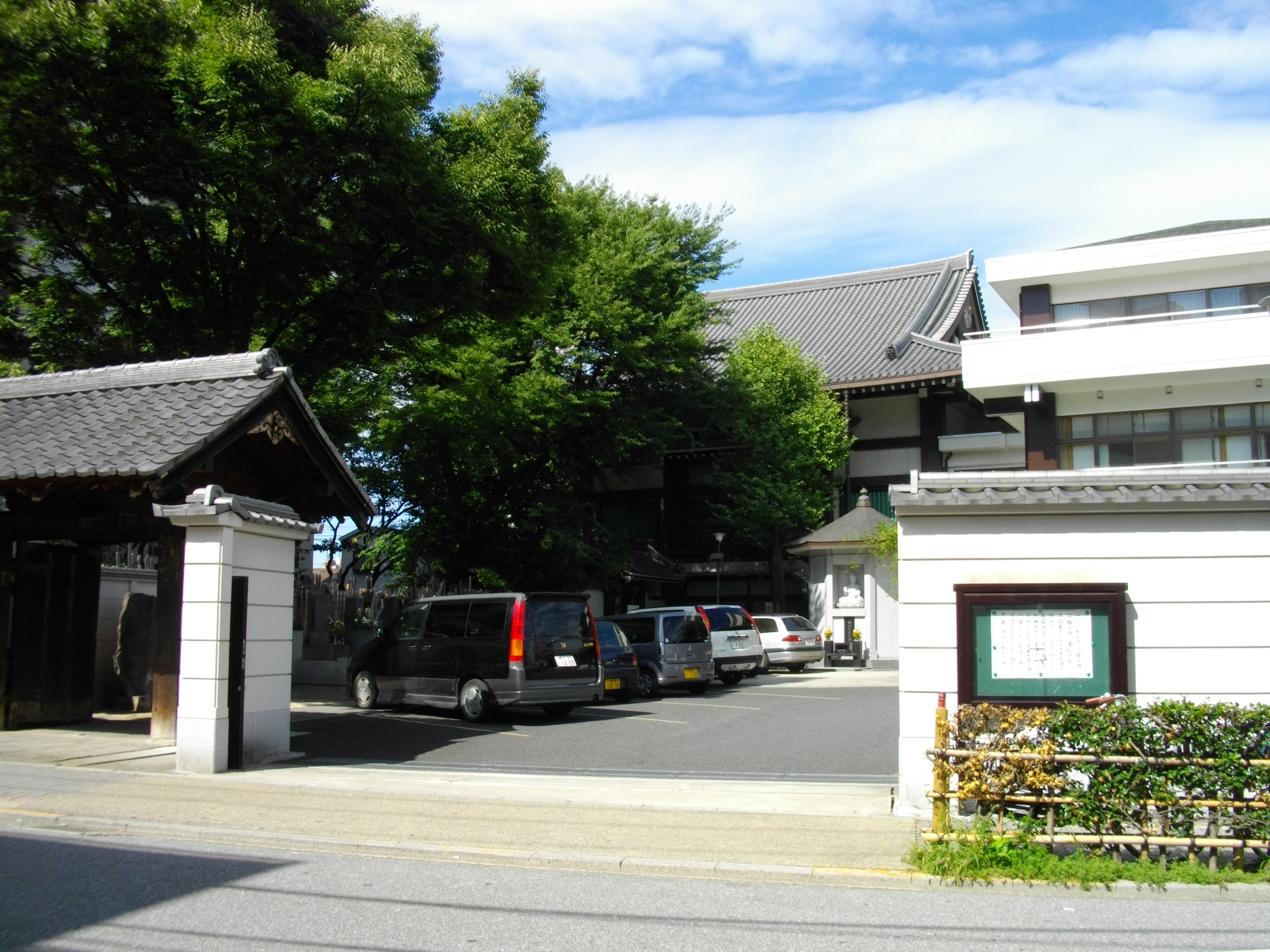
Modern entrance of Jōkan-ji in Arakawa, Tokyo

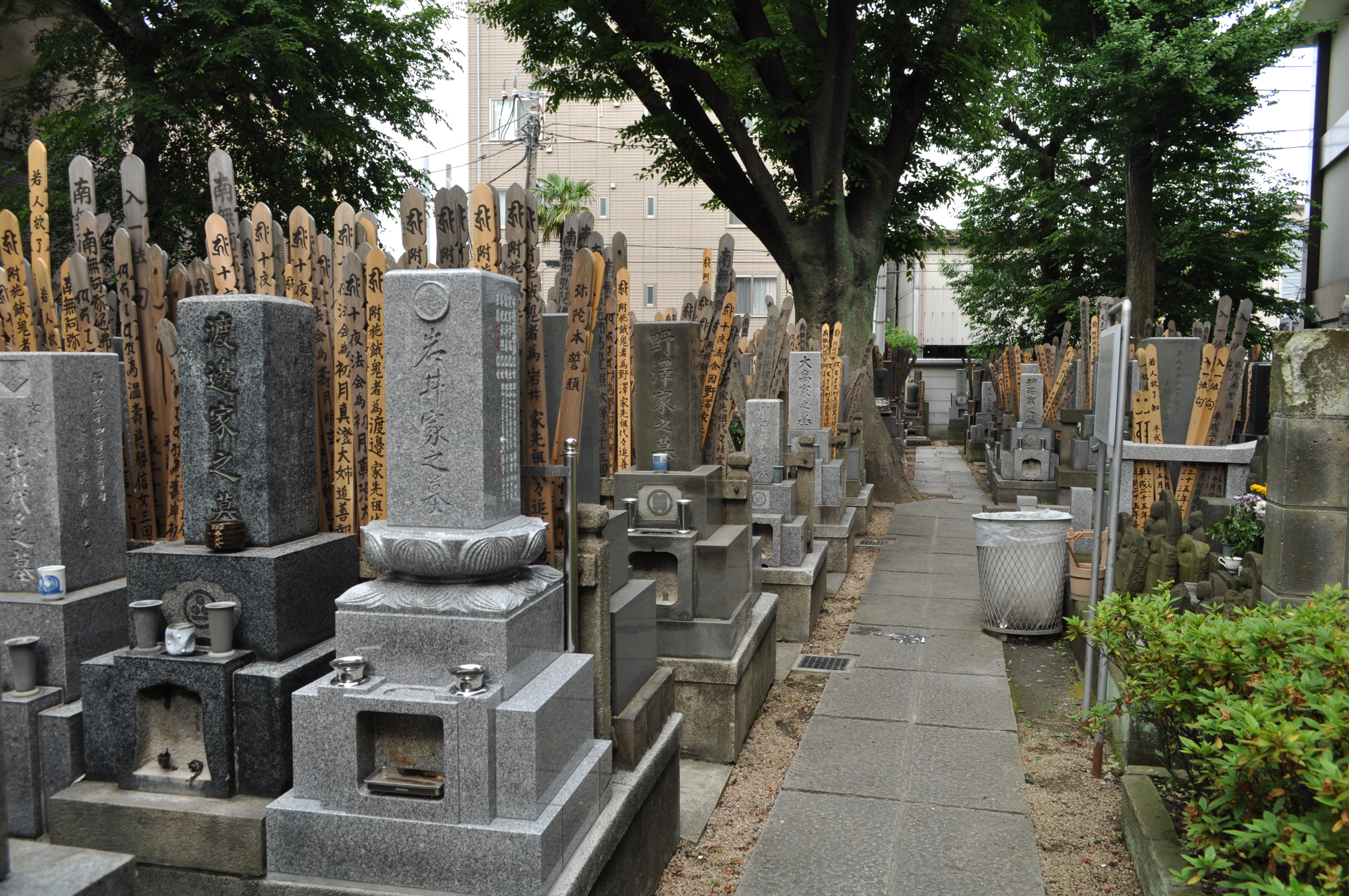
Cemetery of Jōkan-ji

Jōkan-ji (浄閑寺) is a Buddhist temple in Arakawa, Tokyo, Japan. Its cemetery houses the remains of about 25,000 prostitutes and fire victims of the Yoshiwara quarter of the Edo period. A memorial to the dead was consecrated in the Meiji era.

== History ==
The temple was opened in 1655. The dead bodies of prostitutes of the Yoshiwara quarter who were too poor, which was the vast majority of them, were tucked into a hay mat and brought to the back entrance of the temple and left there. This is the reason that the temple became popularly known as Nage-komi-dera (Throw-away temple).

== See also ==
- Jōgan-ji (Nakano, Tokyo)
- Ubasute
