= Tayu =

Tayu may refer to:

- Tayū, highest class of traditional entertainer in Japan
- Tayu, Liaoning, a town in Wanghua District, Fushun, Liaoning, People's Republic of China
- Archidasyphyllum diacanthoides, a species of tree in the family Asteraceae endemic to Chile and Argentina, known as tayu in Mapudungun
- Tayu (subdistrict), a subdistrict in Pati Regency, Central Java, Indonesia

== See also ==
- Dayu (disambiguation)
- Yu the Great (Chinese: 大禹; Wade–Giles: Ta Yü), legendary Chinese leader
- Ta Yü (game), strategy game named after the Chinese leader
