= Daio =

Daio may refer to:

- Daio Wasabi Farm, Azumino, Nagano Prefecture, Japan
- Daio Paper, Japan's third largest paper company

== People ==
- Daniel Daio, former Prime Minister of São Tomé and Príncipe
- Daio Powell, Welsh rugby player

== See also ==
- Dayo (disambiguation)
