= Dayu Subdistrict, Kunming =

Dayu Subdistrict 大渔街道
- Subdistrict
- Location in Yunnan
- Coordinates: 24°49′55″N 102°47′41″E
- Country: People's Republic of China
- Province: Yunnan
- Prefecture-level city: Kunming
- District: Chenggong District
- Time zone: UTC+8 (China Standard)

Dayu Subdistrict (simplified Chinese: 大渔街道; traditional Chinese: 大漁街道; pinyin: Dàyú Jiēdào) is a subdistrict in Chenggong District, Kunming, China. As of 2023, it administers seven residential communities: Dayu Community, Yuejiao Community (月角社区), Dahe Community (大河社区), Xincun Community (新村社区), Haiyan Community (海晏社区), Shicheng Community (石城社区), and Changle Community (常乐社区).

== See also ==
- List of township-level divisions of Yunnan
