= Dayu, Zhejiang =

Dayu 大渔镇
- Town
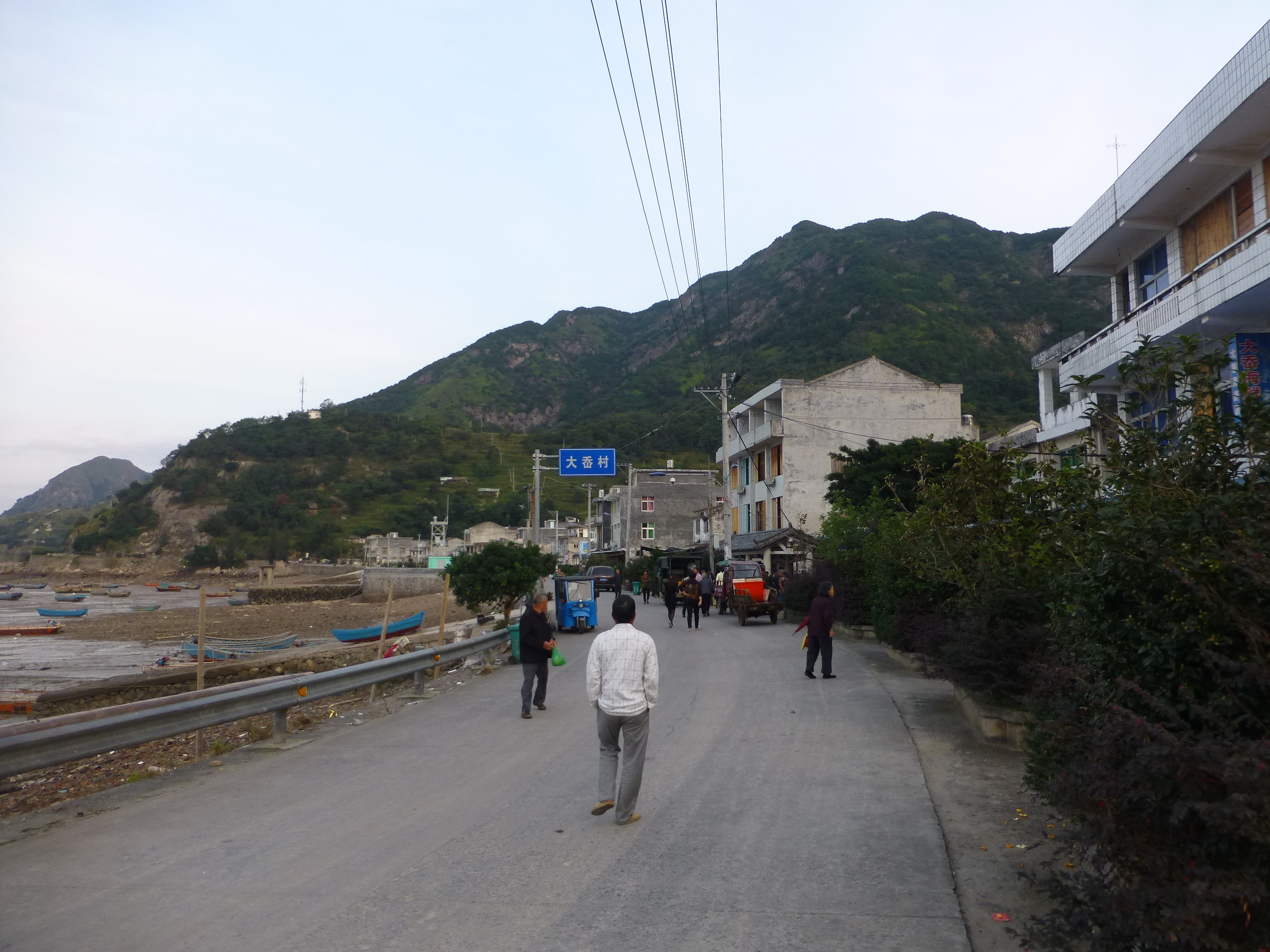
- Da'ao Village

- Location in Zhejiang
- Coordinates: 27°23′19″N 120°36′16″E
- Country: People's Republic of China
- Province: Zhejiang
- Prefecture-level city: Wenzhou
- County: Cangnan County
- Time zone: UTC+8 (China Standard)

Dayu (simplified Chinese: 大渔; traditional Chinese: 大漁; pinyin: Dàyú) is a town under the administration of Cangnan County, Zhejiang, China. As of 2023, it administers six villages: Nanxingjie Village (南行街村), Beixingjie Village (北行街村), Yu'ao Village (渔岙村), Da'ao Village (大岙村), Xiaoyu Village (小渔村), and Da'aoxin Village (大岙心村).
