= Dayu, Ruzhou =

Dayu 大峪镇
- Town
- Location in Henan
- Coordinates: 34°14′43″N 113°2′23″E
- Country: People's Republic of China
- Province: Henan
- Prefectural city: Pingdingshan
- County-level city: Ruzhou
- Time zone: UTC+8 (China Standard)

Dayu (Chinese: 大峪; pinyin: Dàyù) is a town under the administration of Ruzhou, Henan, China. As of 2023, it administers the following 24 villages:

- Dayu Village
- Zhaolou Village (赵楼村)
- Xiajiao Village (下焦村)
- Xingyao Village (邢窑村)
- Tianyao Village (田窑村)
- Liuyao Village (刘窑村)
- Daquan Village (大泉村)
- Houpo Village (后坡村)
- Yangyao Village (杨窑村)
- Longwang Village (龙王村)
- Banzhuang Village (班庄村)
- Huangyao Village (黄窑村)
- Mianhua Village (棉花村)
- Wangtai Village (王台村)
- Tongfeng Village (同丰村)
- Leiquan Village (雷泉村)
- Gaoling Village (高岭村)
- Liuhe Village (刘河村)
- Yuhuang Village (玉皇村)
- Shiling Village (十岭村)
- Zhaiwan Village (寨湾村)
- Fanzhuang Village (范庄村)
- Yuanyao Village (袁窑村)
- Qingshanhou Village (青山后村)
