= Dayu, Yangqu County =

Dayu 大盂镇
- Town
- Location in Shanxi
- Coordinates: 38°10′34″N 112°42′59″E
- Country: People's Republic of China
- Province: Shanxi
- Prefectural city: Taiyuan
- County-level city: Yangqu County
- Time zone: UTC+8 (China Standard)

Dayu (Chinese: 大盂; pinyin: Dàyú) is a town under the administration of Yangqu County, Shanxi, China. As of 2023, it administers the following twelve villages:

- Dayu Village
- Nangaozhuang Village (南高庄村)
- Shangyuan Village (上原村)
- Shahe Village (沙河村)
- Jingzhuang Village (景庄村)
- Lijiagou Village (李家沟村)
- Daquangou Village (大泉沟村)
- Dongnanwa Village (东南窊村)
- Beijiazhuang Village (北家庄村)
- Jinjiagang Village (金家岗村)
- Jizhengou Village (棘针沟村)
- Yidongxin Village (移动新村)
