= Dayo (given name) =

Given name

Dayọ̀
- Gender: Unisex
- Language: Yoruba

Origin
- Origin: Nigerian
- Meaning: Become Joy
- Region of origin: South-West Nigeria

Dayọ̀ is a Nigerian given name of Yoruba origin, which means "Become Joy". Dayọ̀ is a diminutive form of Yoruba names like "Temidayọ̀" which means "Mine has become joy", ("Temi" means Mine in the Yoruba language). Other full forms of the name include Ekundayọ̀ (Tears become joy), Adedayọ̀ (Crown becomes joy), Ifadayọ̀ (Ifa becomes joy) Oladayọ̀ (Wealth becomes joy) etc.

== Notable people ==
- Dayo Olatunji, musical artist
- Dayo Amusa, Nigerian Actress
- Dayo Odeyingbo, American professional football defensive end
- Dayo Okeniyi, Nigerian-American actor (born 1988)
- Dayo Olapade, American non-fiction writer
- Dayo Ojo, Nigerian footballer
- Dayo Adeboyega, British actor and producer also known as John Boyega
