= Steineridrilus =

Scientific classification
- Domain: Eukaryota
- Kingdom: Animalia
- Phylum: Annelida
- Class: Polychaeta
- Order: incertae sedis
- Family: Histriobdellidae
- Genus: Steineridrilus; Zhang, 2014

Synonyms
- Dayus Steiner & Amaral, 1999

Genus of annelid worms

Steineridrilus is a genus of annelids belonging to the family Histriobdellidae.

Species:

- Steineridrilus cirolanae
