= Shinmachi =

Former red-light district in Osaka, Japan

Coordinates: 34°40′39″N 135°29′52″E

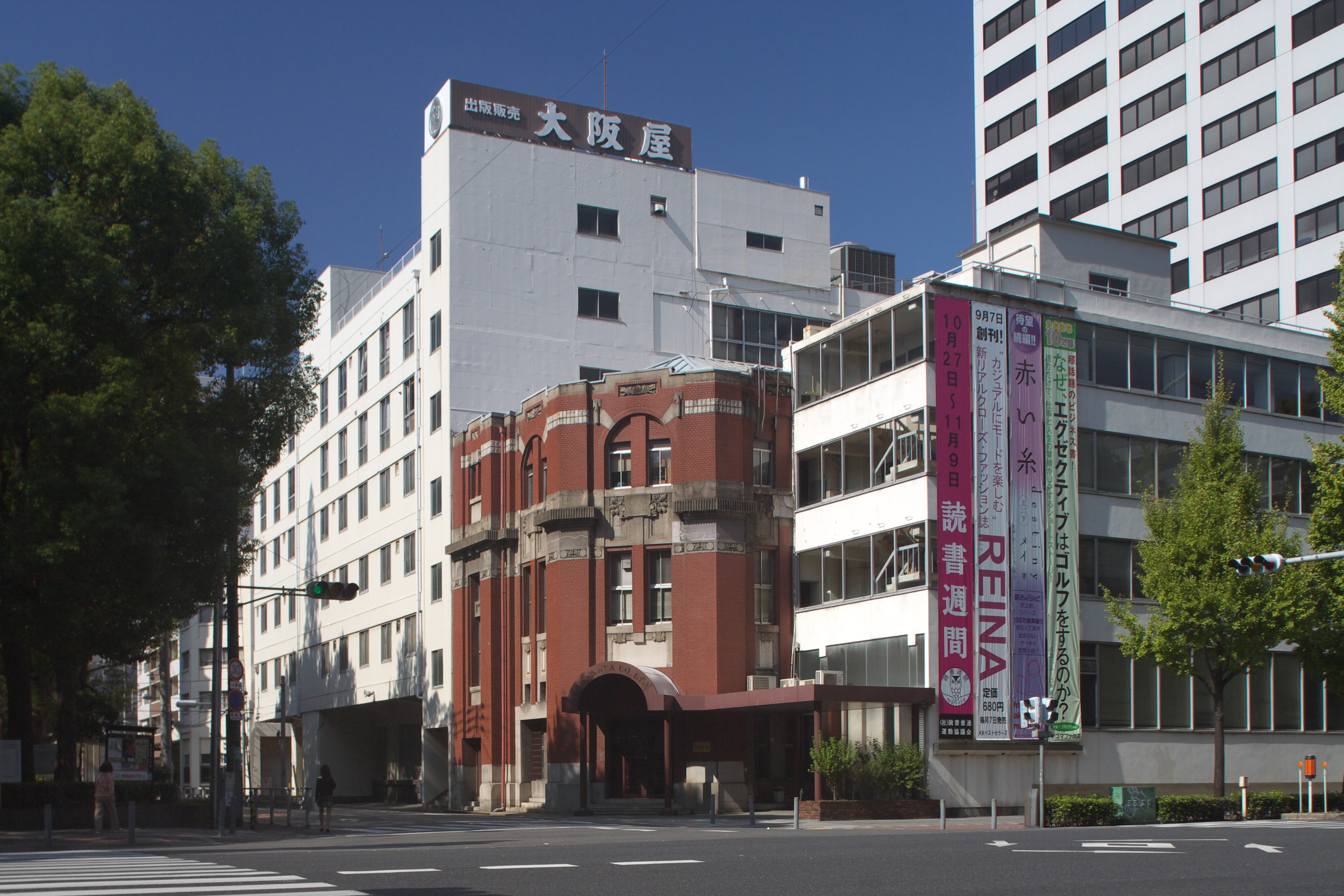

Shinmachi (新町) was a yūkaku (pleasure quarter) in Osaka, built between 1615 and 1623, and operating until its destruction in World War II. It was situated roughly two kilometers southwest of Nakanoshima. Today, it is mostly a tourist attraction and historical site.

Throughout the Edo period (1603–1868), there was widespread male and female prostitution throughout the cities of Kyoto, Edo, and Osaka. The Tokugawa shogunate attempted to control this by restricting prostitution to designated city districts, known as yūkaku. These districts were Shimabara in Kyōto (est. 1640), Shinmachi in Osaka (est. 1624–1644) and Yoshiwara in Edo (est. 1617). These restrictions and controls did not derive from a moral opposition to prostitution, but out of a desire to compartmentalize certain types of activity within the cities. Kabuki and jōruri theatres, and other related entertainment establishments were similarly controlled.
