= Tayu, Liaoning =

Tayu 塔峪镇
- Town
- Location in Liaoning
- Coordinates: 41°47′34″N 123°51′48″E
- Country: People's Republic of China
- Province: Liaoning
- Prefecture-level city: Fushun
- District: Wanghua District
- Time zone: UTC+8 (China Standard)

Tayu (Chinese: 塔峪; pinyin: Tǎyù) is a town under the administration of Wanghua District, Fushun, Liaoning, China. As of 2023, it administers the following fifteen villages:

- Tayu Village
- Chengjia Village (程家村)
- Heping Village (和平村)
- Houerdao Village (后二道村)
- Qian'erdao Village (前二道村)
- Qiangujiazi Village (前孤家子村)
- Hougujiazi Village (后孤家子村)
- Shanchengzi Village (山城子村)
- Dadianzi Village (大甸子村)
- Yingjia Village (英家村)
- Xiaosi Village (小泗村)
- Xiaojia Village (肖家村)
- Tayu Ethnic Korean Village (塔峪朝鲜族村)
- Wangliang Village (汪良村)
- Wulao Village (五老村)
