= Dayu Subdistrict, Weifang =

Dayu Subdistrict 大虞街道
- Subdistrict
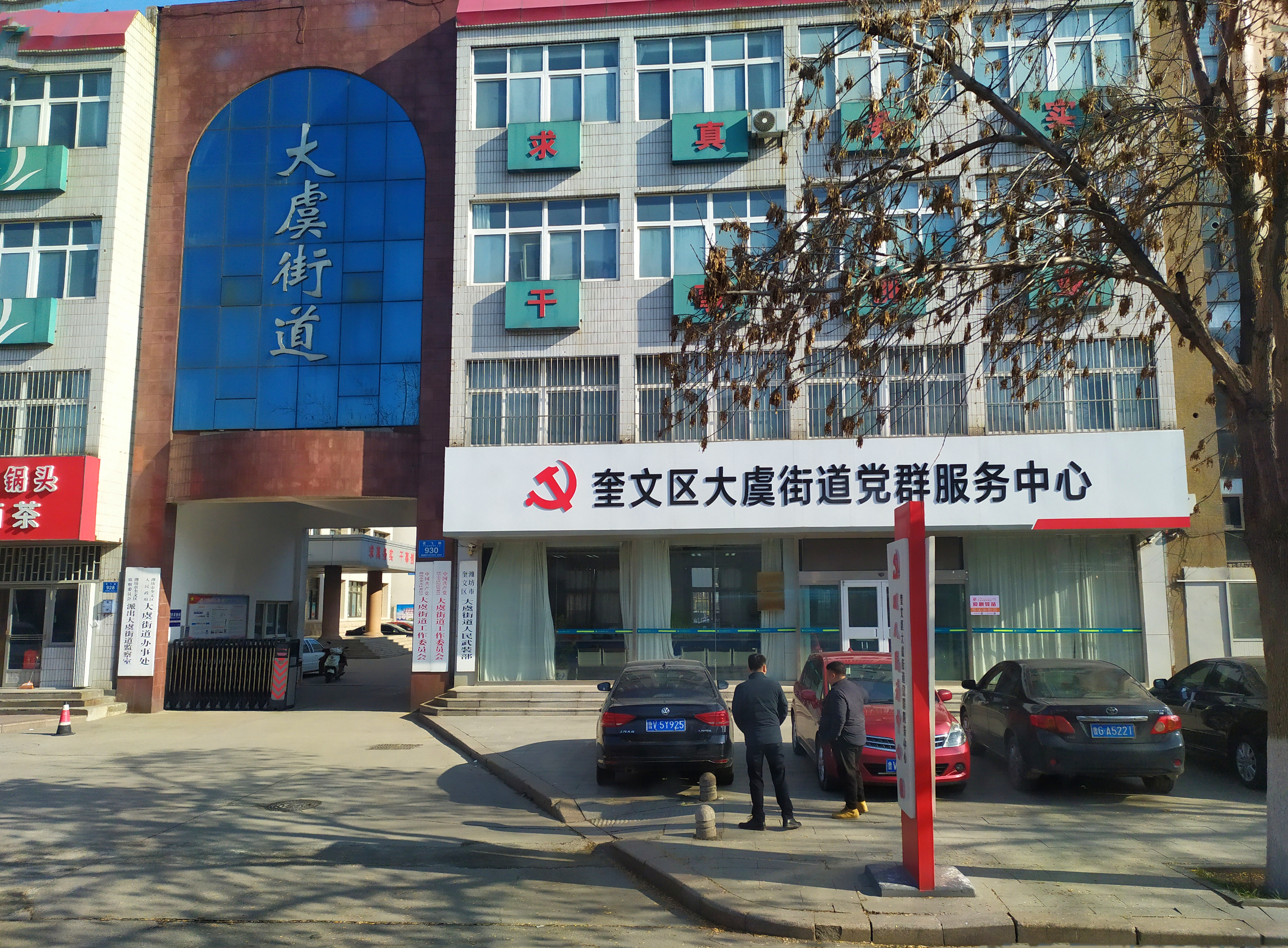
- (Communist) Party-Mass Service Center of Dayu Subdistrict

- Location in Shandong
- Coordinates: 36°43′11″N 119°7′20″E
- Country: People's Republic of China
- Province: Shandong
- Prefecture-level city: Weifang
- District: Kuiwen District
- Time zone: UTC+8 (China Standard)

Dayu Subdistrict (Chinese: 大虞街道; pinyin: Dàyú Jiēdào) is a subdistrict in Kuiwen District, Weifang, China. As of 2023, it administers Xingshi Village (邢石村), Youyi Village (友谊村), and the following nine residential communities:

- Dayu Community
- Dongyuan Community (东园社区)
- Fushoujie Community (福寿街社区)
- Yuzhong Community (虞中社区)
- Dongzhuang Community (东庄社区)
- Chenjia Community (陈家社区)
- Beiyu Community (北虞社区)
- Sunjia Community (孙家社区)
- Xuanwudongjie Community (玄武东街社区)

== See also ==
- List of township-level divisions of Shandong
