= Dayu, Hebei =

Dayu 大峪镇
- Town
- Location in Hebei
- Coordinates: 36°22′14″N 114°11′41″E
- Country: People's Republic of China
- Province: Hebei
- Prefecture-level city: Handan
- District: Fengfengkuang District
- Time zone: UTC+8 (China Standard)

Dayu (Chinese: 大峪; pinyin: Dàyù) is a town under the administration of Fengfengkuang District, Handan, Hebei, China. As of 2023, it administers Yuxin Residential Community (峪新社区) and the following eight villages:

- Nandayu Village (南大峪村)
- Beidayu Village (北大峪村)
- Beijiangoudong Village (北涧沟东村)
- Beijiangouxi Village (北涧沟西村)
- Nanshan Village (南山村)
- Renyi Village (仁义村)
- Linjiagou Village (吝家沟村)
- Xinli Village (新立村)
