= Dayu, Sichuan =

Dayu 大榆镇
- Town
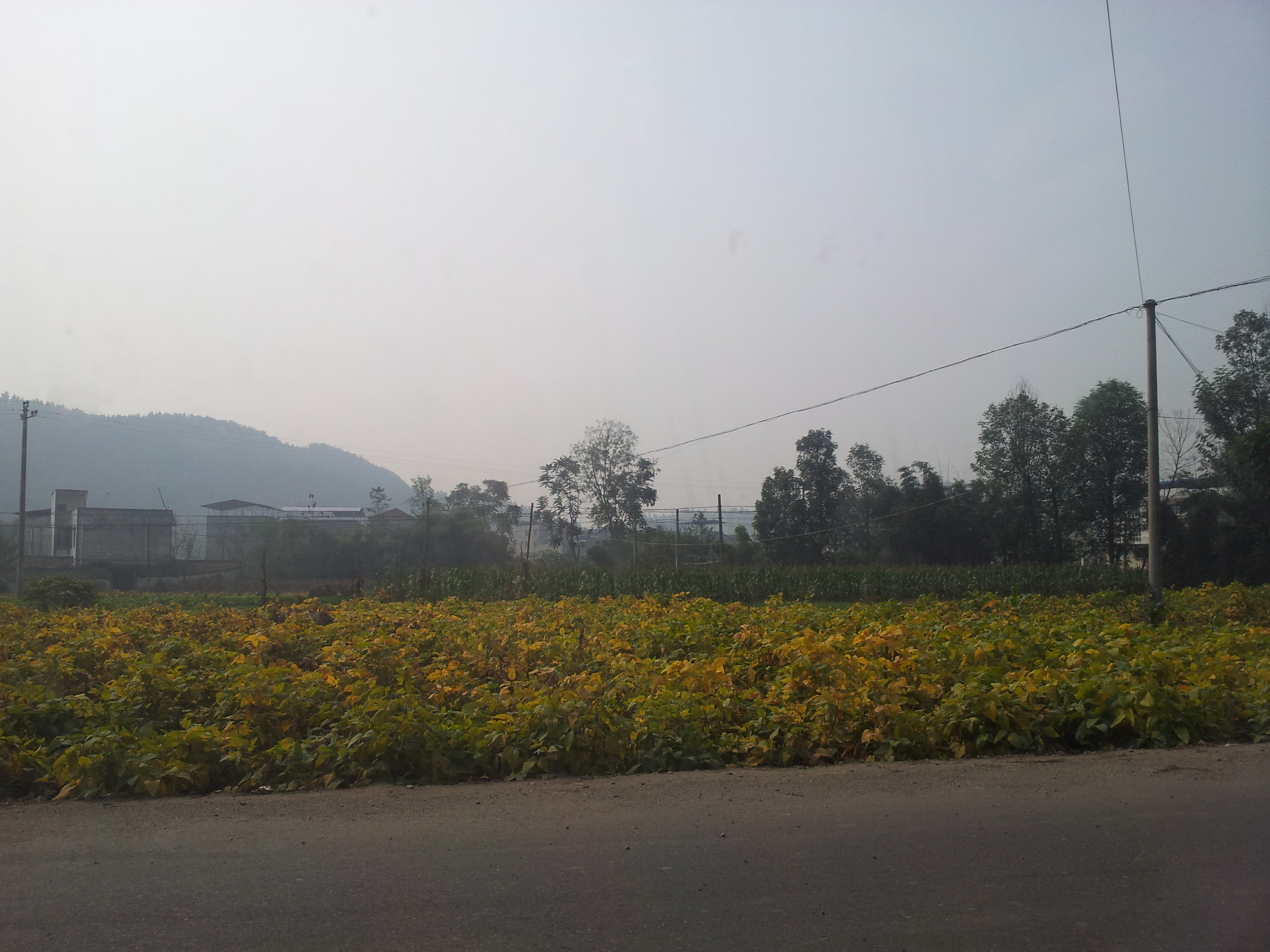

- Location in Sichuan
- Coordinates: 30°51′43″N 105°23′59″E
- Country: People's Republic of China
- Province: Sichuan
- Prefecture-level city: Suining
- County-level city: Shehong
- Time zone: UTC+8 (China Standard)

Dayu (Chinese: 大榆; pinyin: Dàyú) is a town under the administration of Shehong, Sichuan, China. As of 2023, it administers five residential communities: Xingguang Community (星光社区), Jinshan Community (金山社区), Tuqiao Community (土桥社区), Luohubandao Community (螺湖半岛社区), and the following 28 villages:

- Bishan Village (碧山村)
- Wujiaqiao Village (五家桥村)
- Zhangjiakou Village (张家口村)
- Jingwan Village (井湾村)
- Shaolou Village (哨楼村)
- Jintaishan Village (金台山村)
- Guangyu Village (广玉村)
- Taomugou Village (桃木沟村)
- Huanglianzui Village (黄莲嘴村)
- Fangsheng Village (方圣村)
- Xinjing Village (新井村)
- Daqiao Village (大桥村)
- Erlangmiao Village (二郎庙村)
- Guojiaba Village (郭家坝村)
- Gujingkou Village (古井口村)
- Jinhe Village (金鹤村)
- Yongle Village (永乐村)
- Zhongjiadian Village (钟家店村)
- Chadian Village (茶店村)
- Xiaoyaocaizi Village (逍遥才子村)
- Longfengquan Village (龙凤泉村)
- Songlin Village (松林村)
- Haitang Village (海棠村)
- Guangrongqili Village (光荣七里村)
- Huachaomen Village (花朝门村)
- Maliuping Village (麻柳坪村)
- Linjiang Village (临江村)
- Gaibangou Village (改板沟村)
