= Shimabara, Kyoto =

Former red-light district in Kyoto

Coordinates: 34°59′31.3″N 135°44′38.7″E

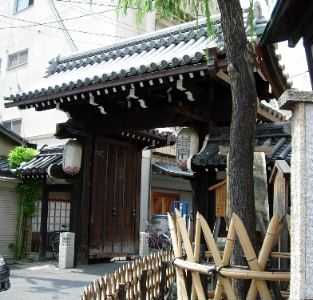
The entrance to Shimabara, Shimabara Daimon (島原大門)

Shimabara (嶋原; often simplified to 島原, sometimes styled 嶌原), established in 1640, was the designated red light district (yūkaku) in Kyoto. Following the outlawing of sex work in Japan, it went defunct as a red-light district in the 1950s but continued as a geisha district (hanamachi) for a few more years. By the 1970s, geisha were no longer registered in Shimabara. Tayū, who never disappeared entirely from Shimabara, were allowed to register as a special type of geisha following the outlawing of prostitution, and continue to perform in the district to this day. Shimabara continues to operate as a tourist district, and operates one ochaya.

== History ==
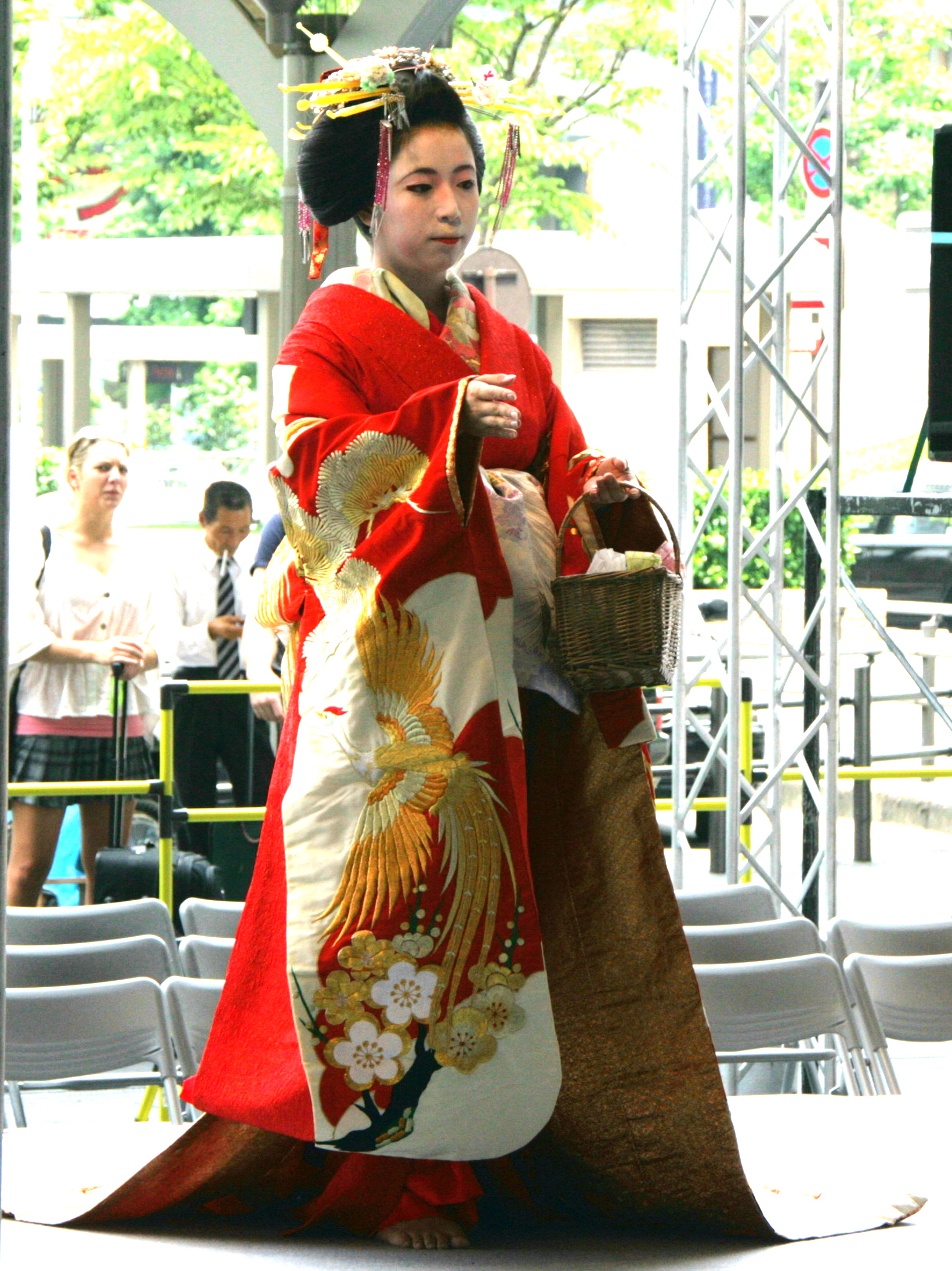
A present-day tayū from Wachigaiya in Shimabara.

Before the establishment of Shimabara, earlier courtesan districts were established: first Second street willow town (二条柳町) in nijō made no kōji (二条万里小路) in 1589, with the permission of Toyotomi Hideyoshi, which was moved to Sixth street (六条) when the Edo period started, which was then moved to Shimabara in 1640/41.

Shimabara was established in 1640 for a brothel owned by Hara Saburoemon and was closed (as a prostitution district) in 1958, when prostitution was outlawed in Japan, though it continued as a geisha district into the 1970s. There are many explanations for the name Shimabara; it may refer to the large gate (Ōmon) that resembled the gate of Shimabara Castle in Hizen, or may be a reference to the then-recent Shimabara Rebellion (1637–38) (which was provoked by the construction of the castle), due to the chaotic founding of Shimabara. In the Tokugawa period, it was also called "the licensed quarter" (go-men no ocho) or simply "the quarter" to distinguish the higher-class residents within from the unlicensed women who operated throughout the cities.

Shimbara was one of the three districts known as yūkaku (pleasure quarter) established in the major cities of Japan by the Tokugawa shogunate to restrict prostitution to designated districts. These districts were Shimabara in Kyoto (established 1640), Shinmachi in Ōsaka (established 1624–1644) and Yoshiwara in Edo (established 1617). These restrictions and controls were designed to control the widespread male and female prostitution of the Edo period (1603–1868). They did not derive from a moral opposition to prostitution but out of a desire to compartmentalize certain types of activity within the cities. Kabuki and jōruri theatres, and other related entertainment establishments were similarly controlled. When geisha subsequently developed in the mid-1700s, some operated in Shimabara, and hence it also became a hanamachi (geisha district).

The Meiji restoration and resulting move of the imperial court to Tokyo caused economic difficulties to many traditional businesses in Kyoto that catered to the aristocracy. While the other five hanamachi adapted and have continued to this day, Shimabara entered a slow decline over the following hundred years, finally ceasing as a geisha district in the 1970s, though traditional activities continue at a low level to the present. This decline is largely attributed to Shimabara's isolation — it was originally established on the outskirts of town and remains relatively isolated and inconvenient, compared to the other districts, which are more centrally located.

As with other Kyoto geisha districts, from the late 19th century Shimabara had a dance hall and an annual dance show, known as "green willow dance" or "dance of the willow in leaf" (青柳踊, Aoyagi odori). This was staged from 1873 to 1880 but ceased in 1881, together with a general decline in the dancing of the district. The dance hall was established in 1873, moved to another location in 1927, but after World War II (post-1945) it was instead used as offices and was eventually torn down in 1996.

== Status ==
While it remained active as a hanamachi until the 1970s, it is now largely defunct, without a resident geisha population and with no active okiya; where the district's dance hall once stood is now a nursing home. Today, it is mostly a tourist attraction and historical site; two teahouses remain, conserved as Cultural Assets: the Sumiya (角屋), established in 1641, and the Wachigaiya (輪違屋), established in 1688.

== Sights ==
The main gate at the east and the two tea houses (Wachigaiya and Sumiya) form the three main attractions; though a few additional sights remain – a shrine, a historical ginkgo tree (and associated shrine), and stone markers (seven in all), mostly indicating ruins (such as the remains of the former west gate, where the dance hall once stood, etc.). A map is available in front of Sumiya.

=== Sumiya ===
Sumiya is the center of tourism in the area and is operated as a museum Sumiya motenashi-no-bunka bijutukan (角屋もてなしの文化美術館], Sumiya Hospitality Cultural Museum), showing the secular culture of the Edo period. Sumiya is one of the very few non-temple, non-shrine and non-palace buildings in Kyoto to survive from the Edo period. It is the only remaining former ageya (a restaurant and establishment for entertainment in the pleasure quarters) and is the largest machiya in Kyoto. Unlike most machiya, which are generally narrow, Sumiya has a large frontage on the street. This is because it consists of three buildings, purchased over the years. The middle is the oldest, dating to the founding in 1641 (or rather relocation of existing business to Shimabara), while the north part was acquired second (1673–80, approximately 30 years after founding), and the south part was acquired last (1787, over 100 years later). The pine great hall burnt down in a small fire in 1925, but the rest of the building is original. Many parts of the compound have been designated as important cultural properties, starting in 1952.

It is open about half the year, during the tourist season, from mid-March to mid-July and again mid-September to mid-December. The first floor is open on a walk-up basis, while the second floor requires advance registration for guided tours (in Japanese) given a few times per day. The first floor of the museum features a large back garden, a small inner garden, three tea houses, a large banquet hall facing the back garden (the pine room (matsu-no-ma)) that could fit up to 100 people (main location where parties were held), a smaller banquet hall (the wicker room (ajiro-no-ma)) facing the inner garden, and a vast kitchen, together with exhibits. The back garden contains a racked gravel bed (rock garden) and a trellised (pergola) pine tree (second generation, about 100 years old).

There are many details, such as a sword rack and sword chest where katana were checked to prevent violence – guests placed their sword on the rack, and it was then moved to the chest. There are paintings, most significantly Plum Blossoms by Buson, with other colorful paintings in the pine room, and records of the menus, which were paid for on a "bill afterwards" basis. In addition to housing many fine paintings, it was a salon for noted haiku poets, and many poems are preserved in the archives.

The second floor features three linked front rooms, each of different designs; these could be connected by removing the doors for larger parties. There are many paintings on the partitions, which have become stained with the soot of centuries of candles. In one room the paintings have not been cleaned, so the pictures are not very visible, but the age is; in another the paintings were cleaned a century ago, showing an intermediate state; while there are more recent paintings which are unstained and brilliantly colored. At the south end there is a recessed raised stage for musicians to perform; they entered by a side door from a side corridor. There are two smaller middle rooms, and the highest-ranked room is in the back, away from the street and overlooking the garden, separated from the livelier party below. In the past this provided a view of the western mountains and Arashiyama, though it is now blocked by the JR line and, hence, covered by trees. This high-ranked room is decorated in mother-of-pearl inlay, in a Chinese-inspired style that was popular circa 1800, and is the only surviving room in this style. Unusually, the work is signed, reflecting the skill and prestige of the artist.

Sumiya was a favorite with the Shinsengumi (late Edo period police force). They frequently partied there, eventually running up such high bills that they were forbidden (by leadership) from going there any further. Violent incidents occurred – a leader was about to be murdered on one occasion (later on the way back to their home, he was assassinated), while on another a member of the force slashed at the pillars out of anger pressed for delinquent payment, leaving three gouges, which remain to this day. Conversely, it was used by reformers such as Saigō Takamori for fund-raising parties.

While Sumiya was originally an ageya (pleasure house), where guests were entertained by tayū and oiran, by the late Edo period it was exclusively a restaurant and non-sexual entertainment space. It continued to operate the pine room as an entertainment space until 1985, when it closed after 345 years in business. In 1989 the Sumiya preservation society was founded, and in 1998 the museum opened.

=== Wachigaiya ===
Wachigaiya continues to operate as an ochaya – geisha from other districts entertain there, as do tayū – and as such is not open to the public.

== Location ==
External image
- Map of Shimabara

Shimabara is located in what is now the ward of Shimogyō-ku, on a short stretch of Hanayachō Street (花屋町通), which runs east-west. Starting from Omiya Street (大宮通) (just west of the north side of the temple of Nishi Honganji) and going west, there is first a stretch of shops on Shimabara shopping street (嶋原商店街, Shimabara Shōtengai), then past Mibugawa street (壬生川通, Mibugawa-dōri) Hanayachō goes slightly south, then one reaches the main gate (大門, Ōmon), where Shimabara proper starts. Proceeding west, Hanayachō ends and the street turns north then west again, where one exits past a marker indicating the ruins of the former west gate, and then faces the JR West Sagano Line (section of Sanin Main Line). The closest rail station is Tambaguchi Station on the Sagano line.

Narrowly speaking, the district is on the east-west axis of Hanayachō (between the two gates), crossed by three north-west streets, and extended one block north and south (to the next east-west cross streets). These four streets were repaved with traditional field stones in the early 2010s, evoking the atmosphere of yesteryear. The actual south boundary slightly further south than the paving zone – there are two close parallel east-west streets at the south end, and the paving extends only to the northern one, while the traditional boundary was at the southern one.
