= Dayu, Bushehr =

Dayu دايو
- Village
- Location within Iran
- Coordinates: 27°50′31″N 52°16′36″E
- Country: Iran
- Province: Bushehr
- County: Jam
- Bakhsh: Central
- Rural District: Jam

Population (2006)
  - Total: 124
- Time zone: UTC+3:30 (IRST)

Dayu (Persian: دايو, also Romanized as Dāyū; also known as Dāyo) is a village in Jam Rural District, in the Central District of Jam County, Bushehr Province, Iran. At the 2006 census, its population was 124, in 20 families.
