= Michiyakko =

Japanese actress and singer

- 美ち奴
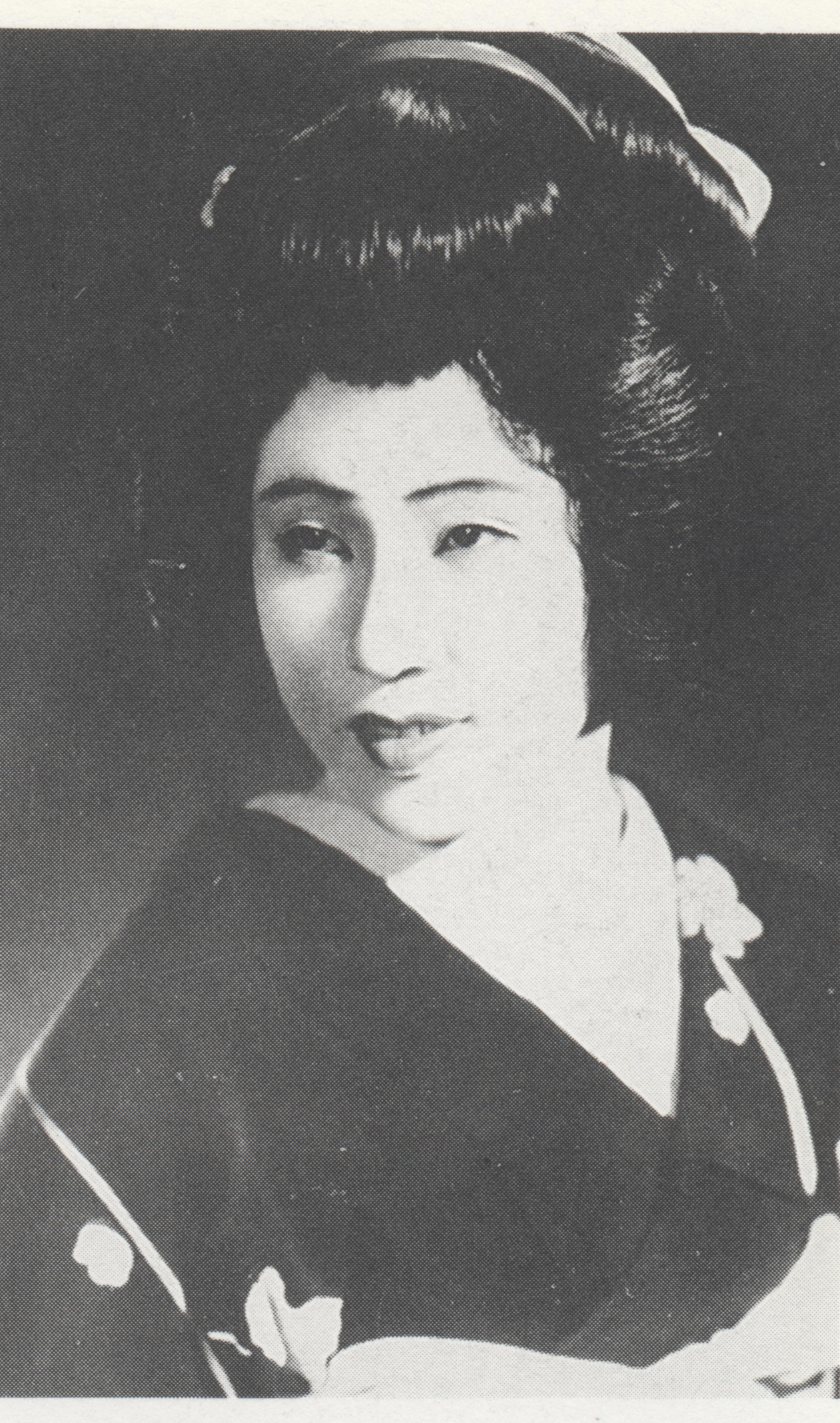
- Born: 8 June 1917; Hamatonbetsu, Hokkaido, Japan
- Died: 29 May 1996 (aged 78); Tokyo, Japan
- Other name: Someko Kubo
- Occupations: geisha, singer, actress

Michiyakko (Japanese: 美ち奴; 8 June 1917 – 29 May 1996), was the stage name of Someko Kubo. She was a geisha and singer active during the Showa era. Her brother was comedian Senzaburo Fukami.

== Life ==
Michiyakko was born in Hamatonbetsu, Hokkaido, eldest of four siblings. Her father Yurita Kubo went by the stage name Tamajiro Nakamura. He was from Tokushima Prefecture and led a traveling kabuki troupe from the late Meiji period to the early Taisho period. He ended up in Hamatonbetsu and married the daughter of a local woodworker. He came to Hamatonbetsu because Yurita's sister ran a kimono shop there. Influenced by her father, she developed an interest in performing arts from a young age and aspired to make a living playing the shamisen.

== Career ==
She came to Tokyo to train in the shamisen, initially relying on a relative who ran a okiya called "Michinoya" in Asakusa. The following year, her relative's business ran into financial difficulties, and 15-year-old Someko became a geisha under the name Michiyakko. Michiyakko became a popular geisha in Asakusa. In 1933, Michiyakko participated in the filming of the talkie portion of the Shochiku film Tokyo Ondo as one of the geishas from Asakusa. Her high-pitched singing voice became popular. She was scouted by Nitto Records (later King Records), which was looking for a singer who was formerly a geisha. In 1934, she made her debut as a record singer with "Sakura Okesa". During her time with Nitto Records, she sang many songs by the then-unknown composer, Ryoichi Hattori. Teichiku Records (later Teichiku Entertainment), a record company that had produced hits with Masao Koga, singled out Michiyakko as a rival to Ichimaru, Kouta Katsutaro and Kiyosaburo Shinbashi. The company signed a transfer contract with her. She appeared in many films, gaining popularity before and during the war with works such as Yajikita Dochuuki, Shimizu Port, Utau Tanuki Goten, and Hebihime Dochu. She maintained her following as a singer with hits like "Kira no Nikichi," "Kaido Ishimatsu Bushi," "Jirocho Bushi," and "Shanran Bushi."

During World War II, her song “A, Sore Nanoni”, described as “overturning existing perceptions of the reality of control over popular entertainment” following the Marco Polo Bridge Incident, was censored and eventually banned from radio by the Japanese Imperial Government.

== Death ==
After the war, she led a turbulent life, having lost her parents, whom she had brought to live with her, in the Tokyo air raids, and experiencing romantic entanglements. She entered a nursing home with Hiroko Nakano, a female sword-fighting performer with whom she had shared hardships in the same troupe after the war. She died from colon cancer in 1996, and on the night of the 49th-day memorial service, Nakano died shortly after the service. She was 78 years old.
