= Geisha =

Japanese female entertainer and hostess

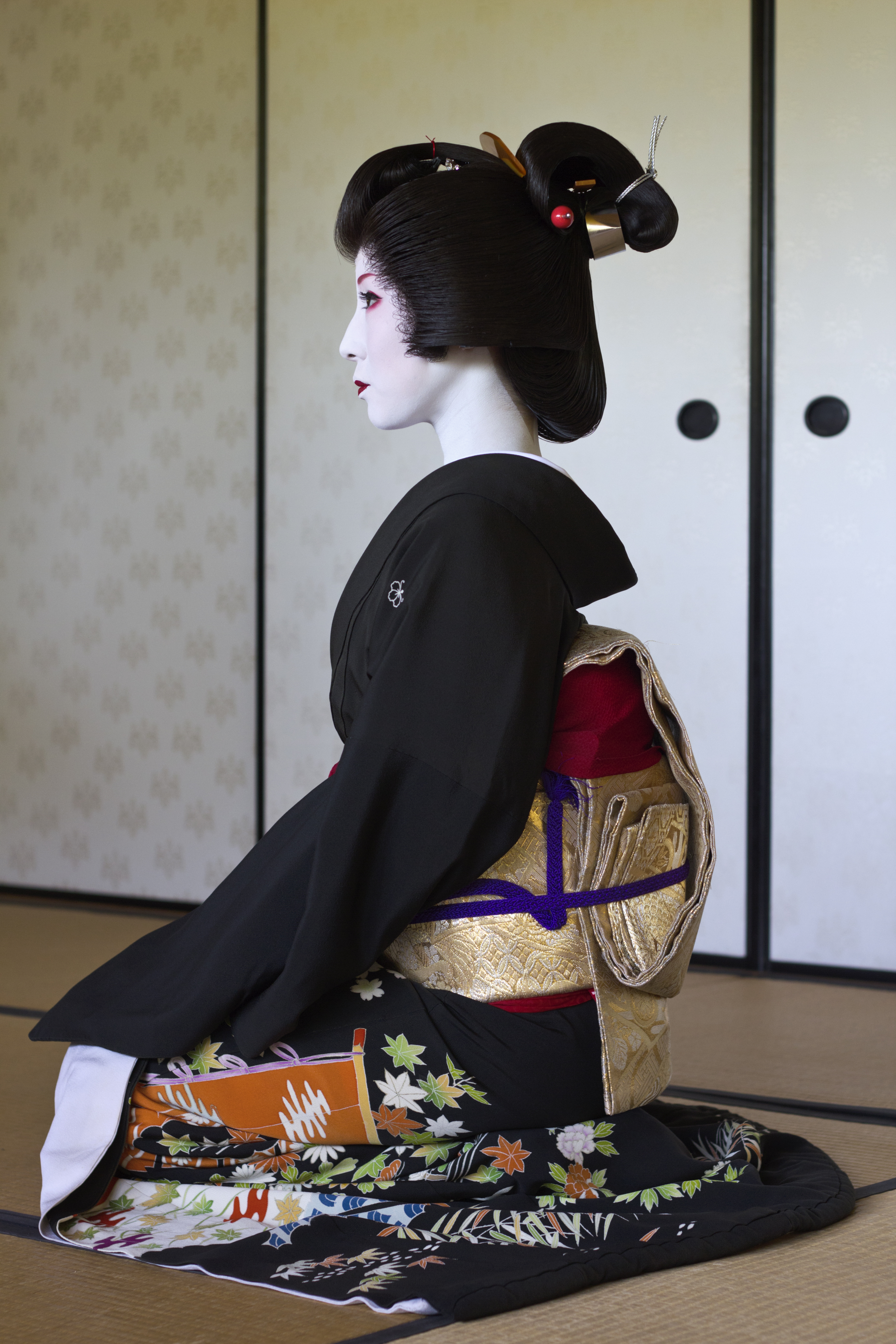
Profile of a Miyagawa-chō geiko (geisha) Kimiha wearing a trailing, formal black kimono (kuromontsuki hikizuri) and a chū taka shimada-style nihongami wig

Geisha (Note: English: /ˈɡeɪ.ʃə/, Japanese: [ɡei.ɕa, ɡeː-]) (芸者), also known as geiko (Note: Japanese: [ɡei.ko, ɡeː-]) (芸子; in Kyoto and Kanazawa) or geigi (Note: Japanese: [ɡeꜜi.ɡi, ɡeꜜː-, -ŋi]) (芸妓), are female Japanese performing artists and entertainers trained in traditional Japanese performing arts styles, such as dance, music and singing, as well as being proficient conversationalists and hosts. Their distinct appearance is characterised by long, trailing kimono, traditional hairstyles and oshiroi make-up. Geisha entertain at parties known as ozashiki, often for the entertainment of wealthy clientele, as well as performing on stage and at festivals.

The first female geisha appeared in 1751, with geisha before that time being male performers who entertained guests. Only later did the profession become mainly characterised by female workers. (Note: "In fact, the first type of geisha in the yūkaku were men. Also called taiko mochi (drum bearers) or hōkan, they appeared in the 1660s as jesters and buffoons who would come to liven up parties held in the. Some of them were cultured men who had squandered their fortunes in the yūkaku and were reduced to making their living within the confines of the quarters they knew so well. At this time, "geisha" was a masculine term, and the women who began to take on this profession were designated onna (female) geisha. Soon, women began to outnumber the men, and "geisha" came to be considered a feminine term—the prefix otoko (male) coming to be used to denote male geisha.")

The arts that geisha perform are considered highly developed and, in some cases, unique throughout Japan to the world of geisha. For example, the Gion district of Kyoto is the only district wherein the kyo-mai style of Japanese traditional dance is taught. This style of dance is taught solely to the geisha within the district by the Inoue school, with the school's former head, Inoue Yachiyo, having been classified as a "Living National Treasure" by the Government of Japan, the highest artistic award attainable in the country, in 1955.

== Etymology and terminology ==
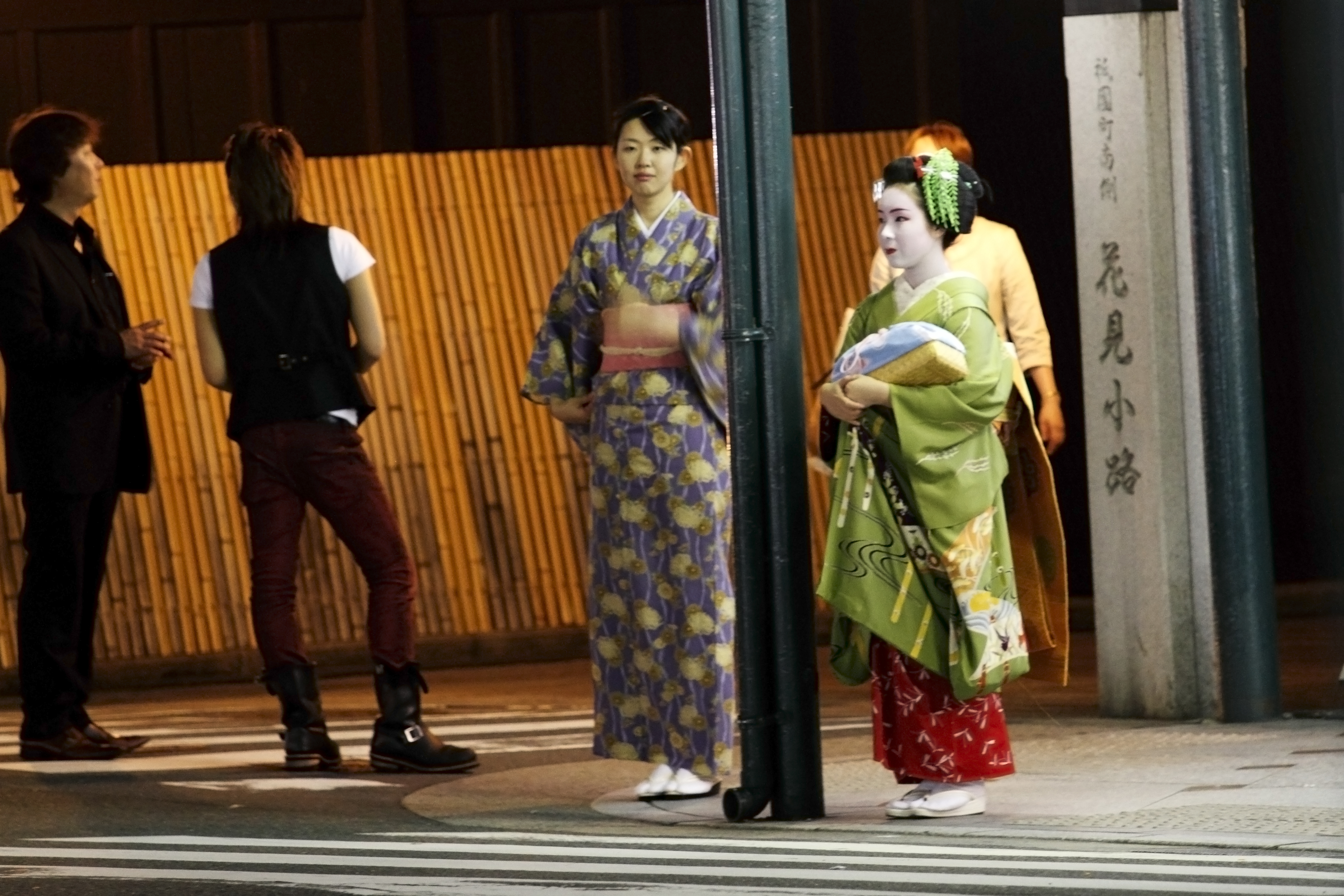
A shikomi (left) accompanying the maiko Takamari of the Kaida okiya in Gion Kobu

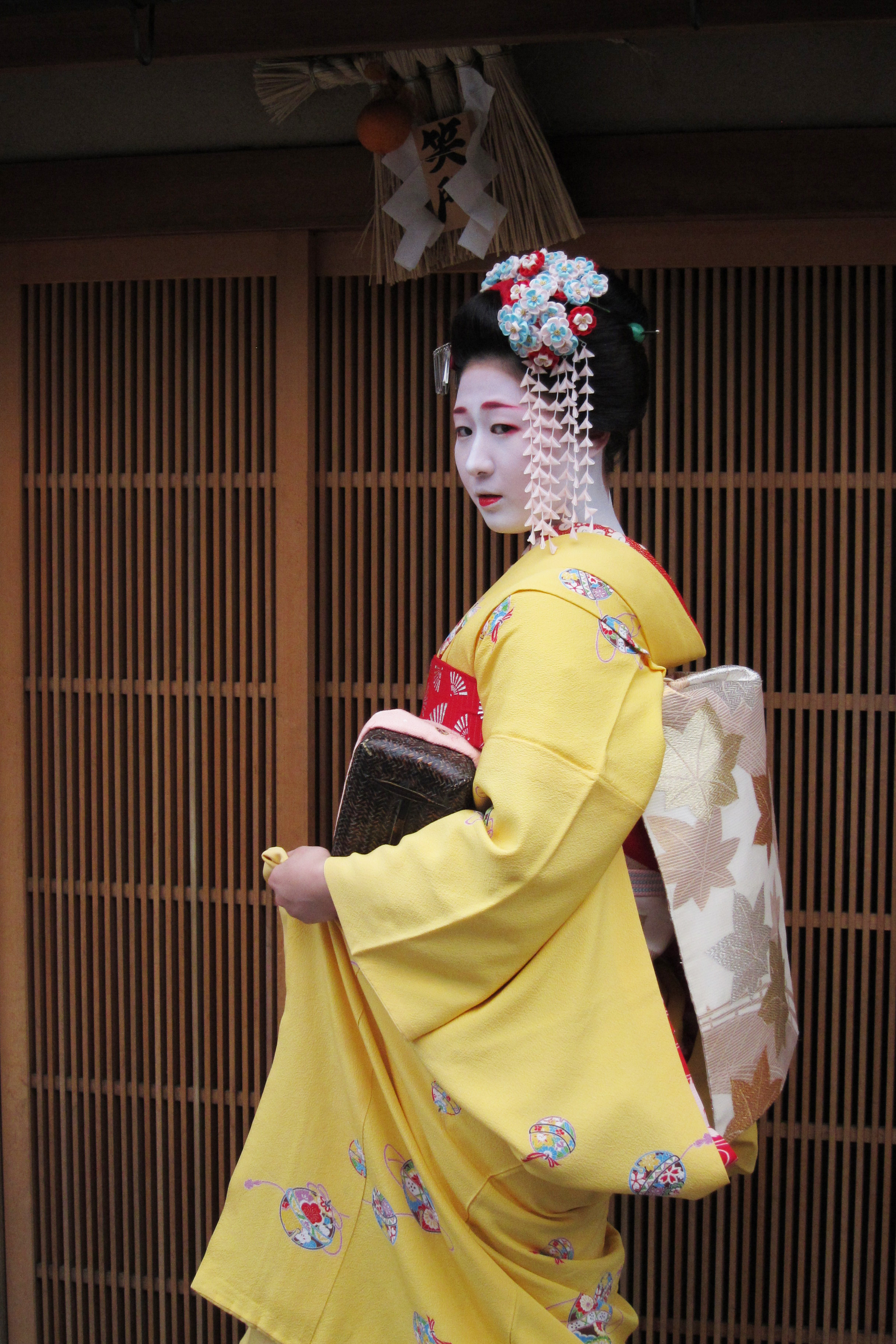
Minarai Katsunosuke wearing a short obi and a large, colourful set of kanzashi hairpins

A number of terms are used to describe the profession and community that geisha both live and work in. Though each has its own distinct meaning and translation, some are used interchangeably to describe the geisha community on the whole, such as hanamachi and karyūkai.

Geiko (芸子)
A regional term for geisha with a slightly different meaning. Geiko refers to geisha in Western Japan, including Kyoto and Kanazawa. This term directly translates as 'woman of art', and is part of the Kyoto dialect spoken by geisha in Kyoto and Western Japan.
Geisha (芸者)
lit. 'artist' or 'performing artist' or 'artisan'. A traditional female hostess, entertainer and performing artist. The word geisha consists of two kanji: gei (芸, meaning 'art') and sha (者, meaning 'person' or 'doer').
Gokagai (五花街, lit. 'five flower towns')
The five geisha districts of Kyoto: Gion Kobu and Gion Higashi, Ponto-chō, Miyagawa-chō and Kamishichiken. Kyoto previously had six hanamachi, with Shimabara, formerly a red light and geisha district, still being considered an active hanamachi in the 1970s. In the present day, Shimabara is active only as a host for tayū, who are considered to be entertainers of a similar kind to geisha, but the district is still not considered to be an active hanamachi.
Hanamachi (花街, lit. 'flower town')
The district where a geisha works, is affiliated, and potentially lives. Geisha generally do not work outside of their hanamachi, though customers may call them for special occasions in other districts, or on excursions – however far away – to places outside the karyūkai.
Han-gyoku (半玉, lit. 'half-jewel')
A term for apprentice geisha in some regions of Japan such as Tokyo. The term han-gyoku means 'half-jewel', referring to one of the terms for a geisha's wages, 'jewel money'.
Kagai (花街, lit. 'flower towns')
An alternative term for the districts in which geisha live and work; interchangeable with karyūkai.
Karyūkai (花柳界, lit. 'flower and willow world')
The community or society that geisha inhabit. In the present day, this term refers solely to the world of geisha, as well as the few remaining tayū; before the decline and eventual disappearance of oiran, the term karyūkai referred to the entertainment districts (the "world") of both geisha and courtesans, with oiran acting as the "flowers", ostensibly for their beautiful and showy appearance, and geisha being the subtler "willows".
Maiko (舞妓)
The most common term for an apprentice geisha, translating to 'woman of dance'.
Minarai (見習い, lit. 'learning by observation')
The second typical stage of a maiko's training, and the step that always follows that of shikomi. A minarai wears a version of a maiko's outfit, with a shorter obi, shorter kimono sleeves, and more hair accessories (kanzashi).
Minarai-jaya (見習い茶屋)
During the minarai period, an apprentice will receive training through one specific teahouse, referred to as the minarai-jaya.
Mizu shōbai (水商売, lit. 'water business')
A euphemistic term for the entertainment and red-light districts in Japan, including the worlds of kabuki actors and geisha.
Ochaya (お茶屋, lit. 'teahouse')
Though geisha may entertain at their okiya, restaurants or inns, they will usually entertain guests at a teahouse.
Okiya (置屋)
A geisha lodging house. All geisha must be registered to an okiya, though not all geisha live in their okiya day-to-day. Okiya are usually run by women, many of whom are ex-geisha themselves. Geisha may entertain guests within their okiya.
Ozashiki (お座敷)
A term for a geisha's engagements, which may take part or the whole of an evening. The term ozashiki combines the name for a banqueting room, zashiki (座敷), and the honorific prefix o- (お), changing the meaning to a term exclusively referring to the engagements a geisha takes.
Shikomi (仕込み, 'preparation' or 'training')
The typical first stage of a maiko's training. Shikomi wear kimono, though they do not wear the elaborate outfit, hairstyle and makeup of fully-fledged maiko.
Tōde (遠出, lit. 'distant outings')
Geisha engagements not held in licensed restaurants, teahouses, or a geisha's own hanamachi.

== History ==
=== Origins ===
In the early stages of Japanese history, saburuko (serving girls) were mostly wandering girls whose families had been displaced by war. Some of these saburuko girls offered sexual services for money while others made a living by entertaining at high-class social gatherings.

After the imperial court moved the capital to Heian-kyō (Kyoto) in 794, aspects of now-traditional Japanese art forms and aesthetic ideals began to develop, which would later contribute to the conditions under which the geisha profession emerged. Skilled female performers, such as shirabyōshi dancers, thrived under the Imperial court, creating the traditions of female dance and performance that would later lead to both the development of geisha and kabuki actors.

During the Heian period, ideals surrounding relationships with women, sexual or otherwise, did not emphasise fidelity, with marriage within the Heian court considered a relatively casual arrangement. Men were not expected to be faithful to their wives, while women were expected to remain faithful to their husbands. The ideal wife instead was seen as a modest mother who managed the affairs of the house, following Confucian customs wherein love had secondary importance to the other roles a wife fulfilled within the marriage. As such, courtesans—who provided not only sexual enjoyment, but also romantic attachment and artistic entertainment—were seen both as an outlet for men and as common companions.Though geisha would not appear until the 1800s, the role and status of courtesans as artistic and romantic entertainers were a tradition that geisha came to inherit, with the basic artforms of entertaining guests through song, dance and conversation being employed and adapted to contemporary tastes by geisha.

Walled-in pleasure quarters known as yūkaku (遊廓/遊郭) were built in the 16th century, with the shogunate designating prostitution illegal to practice outside of these "pleasure quarters" in 1617. Within the pleasure quarters, yūjo (遊女, "[women] of pleasure") – a term used to refer to prostitutes as a whole – were classified and licensed, the upper echelons of which were referred to as oiran, a category with its own internal ranks, the highest of which being the tayū.

Though women in the lower ranks of yūjo did not provide as much artistic entertainment as they did sexual, oiran, whilst still prostitutes, also included the traditional arts as a key aspect of their entertainment, their practice of which differed considerably from those of geisha. As oiran were considered to be low-ranking members of the nobility, the instruments they played and the songs they sang were often confined to those considered "respectable" enough for the upper classes. This typically meant that oiran sang long, traditional ballads (nagauta (lit. 'long songs')), and played instruments such as the kokyū (a type of bowed shamisen) and the koto (a 13-stringed harp).

Some miko and wandering female performers also performed theatrical plays, dances and skits. One such person was Izumo no Okuni, whose theatrical performances on the dry riverbed of the Kamo River are considered to be the beginnings of kabuki theatre.

=== 18th-century emergence of the geisha ===
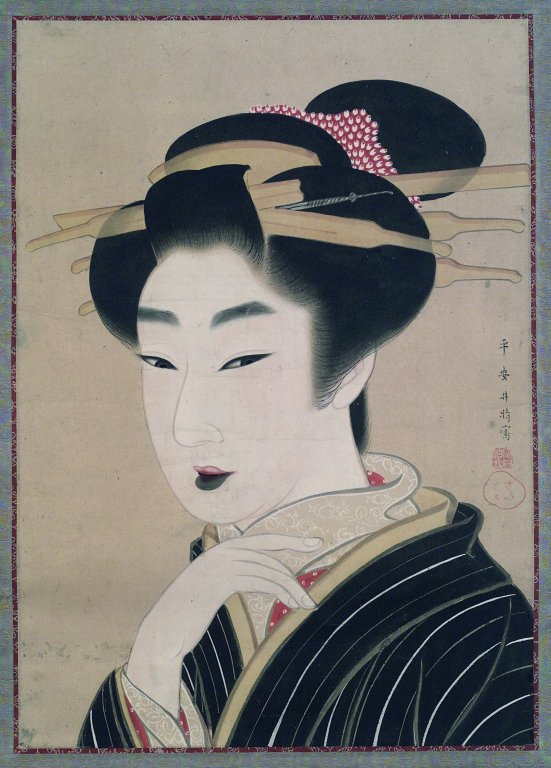
Ukiyo-e scroll depicting a Gion geisha, 1800–1833

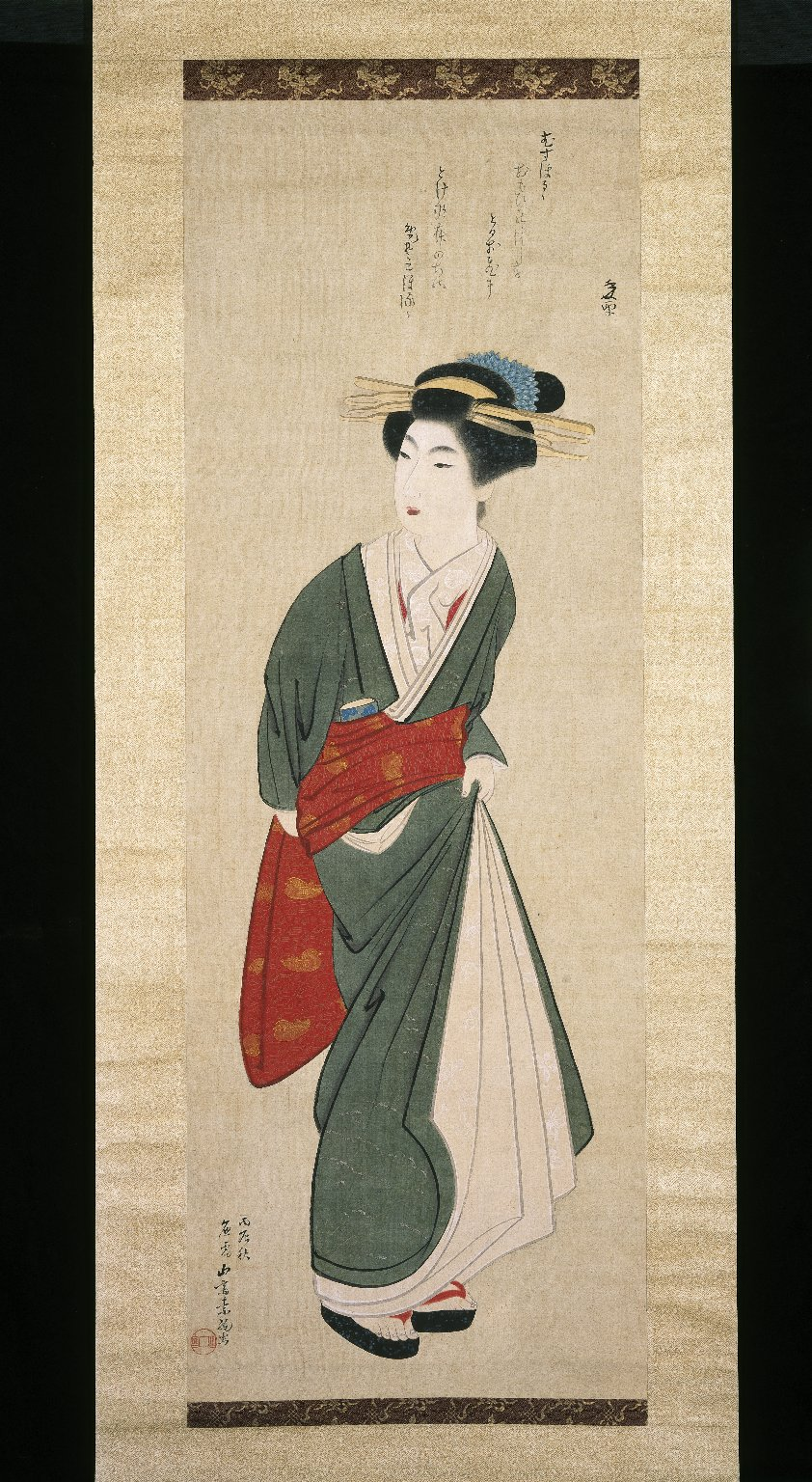
Ukiyo-e print by Yamaguchi Soken of a Kyoto geisha

Following their inception by the shogunate in the 17th century, the pleasure quarters quickly became popular entertainment centres that developed their own additional forms of entertainment outside of sex. The highly accomplished courtesans of these districts entertained their clients by dancing, singing, and playing music. Some were renowned poets and calligraphers as well; the development of the cultural arts of the pleasure quarters led to the rise in oiran being considered to be the celebrities of their day.

Around the turn of the 18th-century, the first geisha, or forerunners of geisha, performing for guests of the pleasure quarters began to appear; these entertainers, who provided song and dance, developed from a number of sources. Some geisha, who were something of travelling entertainers going from party to party, were men, who would entertain the customers of courtesans through song and dance. At the same time, the forerunners of female geisha, the teenage odoriko ("dancing girls"), developed trained and hired as chaste dancers-for-hire within these teahouses. Further still, some courtesans, whose contracts within the pleasure quarters had ended, chose to stay on to provide musical entertainment to guests, making use of the skills they had formerly developed as part of their job.

In the 1680s, odoriko had become popular entertainers and were often paid to perform in the private homes of upper-class samurai. These dancing girls, who were too young to be called geisha but too old (over twenty) to be called odoriko, began to be called geiko. By the early 18th-century, lots of these odoriko had also begun offering sexual services as well as chaste performances. Performers who were no longer teenagers (and could no longer style themselves odoriko). At that time, the word "geiko" became synonymous with illegal prostitute.

The first woman known to have called herself "geisha" was a dancing girl from Fukagawa, roughly around 1750, who had become a skilled singer and shamisen player. The geisha, who took the name of Kikuya, became an immediate success, bringing greater popularity to the idea of female geisha. (Note: Appendix II, a timeline of geisha and related history; Gallagher says that "Kiku" from the Fukugawa district founded the profession in 1750, and that by 1753 one hundred odoriko were consigned to Yoshiwara, which licensed (female) geisha in 1761.)Following Kikuya's success as a geisha, many girls began to make names for themselves as talented musicians, dancers or poets, instead of becoming prostitutes. In the next two decades, female geisha became well known for their talents as entertainers in their own right; these performers often worked in the same establishments as male geisha.

=== Geisha in the 19th-century to present day ===
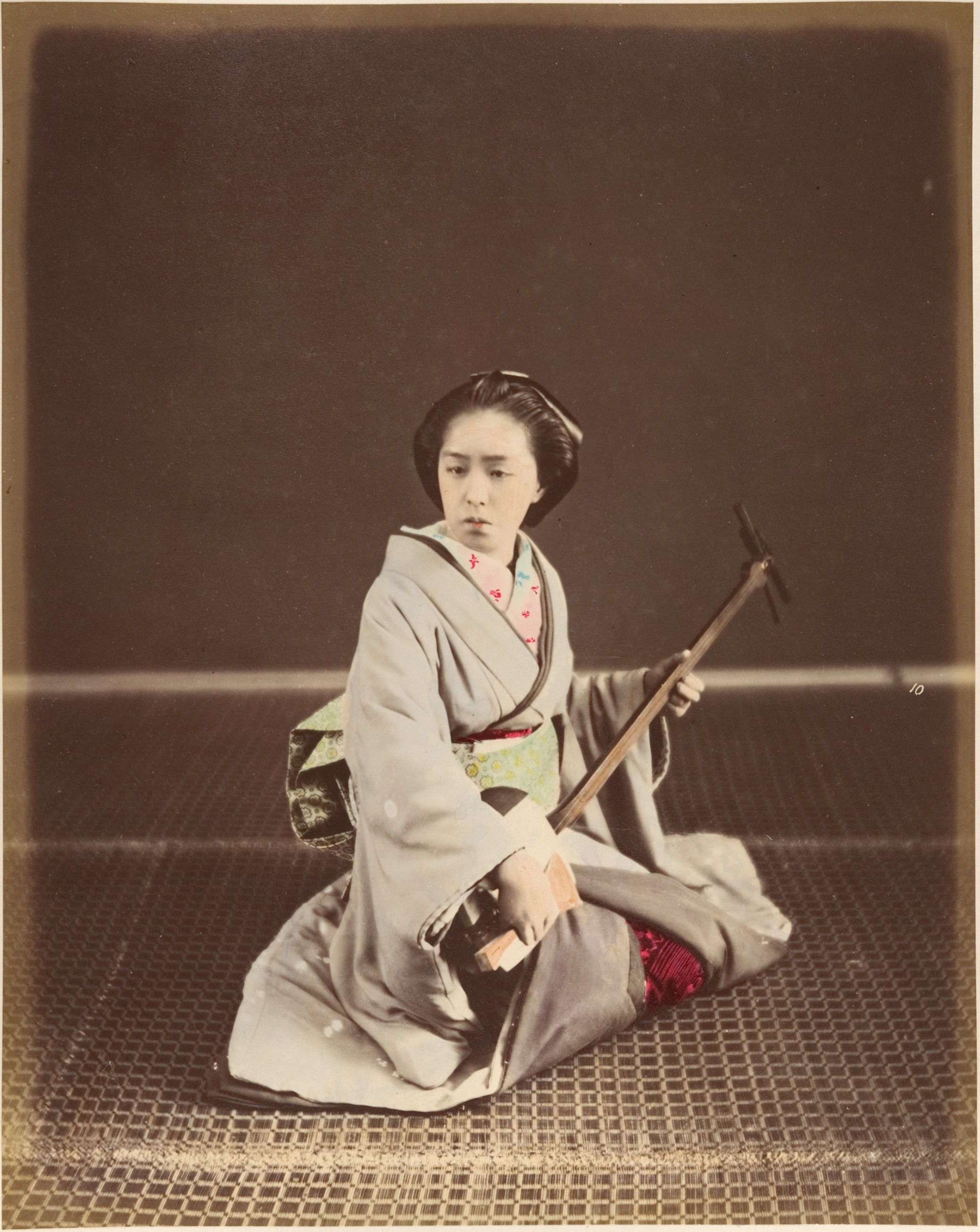
Tokyo geisha with a shamisen, c. 1870s

By 1800, the profession of geisha was understood to be almost entirely female, and was established as a distinct role in its own right; however, geisha were, throughout various points within the Edo period, unable to work outside of the pleasure quarters, being affected by reforms aimed at either limiting or shutting down the pleasure quarters. These reforms were often inconsistent, and were repealed at various times.

Once established as an independent profession, a number of edicts were then introduced in order to protect the business of courtesans and separate the two professions. Geisha were firstly forbidden from selling sex, though many continued to do so; if a courtesan accused a geisha of stealing her customers and business of sex and entertainment, an official investigation was opened, with the potential for a geisha to lose her right to practice the profession. Geisha were also forbidden from wearing particularly flashy hairpins or kimono, both of which were hallmarks of higher-ranking courtesans, who were considered to be a part of the upper classes.

Despite their official status as lower-class entertainers, geisha continued to grow in popularity. While courtesans existed to meet the needs of upper-class men (who could not respectably be seen to visit a lower-class prostitute) and prostitutes met the sexual needs of lower-class men, this left a gap of skilled and refined entertainers for the emerging merchant classes, who, though wealthy, were unable to access courtesans because of their social class.

The status of courtesans as celebrities and arbiters of fashion had also waned considerably. The art forms they practiced had become stiffly-cherished relics of the upper classes, as had their manner of speech and their increasingly gaudy appearance. In contrast, machi geisha (lit. 'town geisha') had begun to successfully establish themselves as worldly, cutting-edge entertainers, more artistically daring than their cloistered, indentured cousins, and able to come and go and dress as they pleased.

This popularity was then increased by the introduction of various laws intended to clamp down on and regulate the lower classes – in particular, the emerging merchant classes who had established themselves as the premiere patrons of geisha. Both had, over time, come to hold much of the purchasing power within Japan, with their status as lower class allowing them a degree of freedom in their tastes of dress and entertainment, in contrast to upper-class families who had little choice but to appear in a manner deemed respectable to their status.

As the tastes of the merchant classes for kabuki and geisha became widely popular, laws introduced to effectively neuter the appearances and tastes of geisha and their customers were passed. This, however, had the adverse effect of leading to the rise in popularity of more refined and subversive aesthetical senses within those classes, further alienating courtesans and their patrons from popularity and contemporary taste; the introduction of laws on dress only furthered the popularity of geisha as refined and fashionable companions for men. As a result, over time, courtesans of both higher and lower ranks began to fall out of fashion, seen as gaudy and old-fashioned.

By the 1830s, geisha were considered to be the premiere fashion and style icons in Japanese society, and were emulated by women of the time. Many fashion trends started by geisha soon became widely popular, with some continuing to this day; the wearing of haori by women, for example, was first started by geisha from the Tokyo hanamachi of Fukagawa in the early 1800s.

There were considered to be many classifications and ranks of geisha, though some were colloquial or closer to a tongue-in-cheek nicknames than an official ranking. Some geisha would sleep with their customers, whereas others would not, leading to distinctions such as kuruwa geisha – a geisha who slept with customers as well as entertaining them through performing arts – yujō ("prostitute") and jorō ("whore") geisha, whose only entertainment for male customers was sex, and machi geisha, who did not, officially and in reality, sleep with customers at all.

By the end of the 19th-century, courtesans no longer held the celebrity status they once did. (Note: "Unlike the previous two hundred years, when artists ... praised the Yoshiwara [Edo brothel district] as an environment of both cultural sophistication and sexual liberation [...] 19th-century artists ... described it in more critical, cynical terms. By the early 20th century, the aura of dignity and élan the courtesans had once exuded was all but lost, and these women, many of whom suffered from venereal disease, appeared more like sexual slaves than celebrities.)

This trend would continue until the criminalisation of prostitution in Japan in 1956.

==== Pre-war and wartime geisha ====
World War II brought lasting change to the geisha profession; before the war, geisha numbers, despite seeing competition from jokyū (café girls, the precursor to the bar hostess profession in Japan), had been as high as 80,000, however, following the closure of all geisha districts in 1944, mostly all geisha had been conscripted into the war effort proper, with many finding work in factories or elsewhere through customers and patrons.

Though geisha returned to the karyūkai relatively quickly after the war, many had decided to stay on in their wartime jobs, considering it to be a more stable form of employment. Both during and after the war, the geisha name lost some status, as some prostitutes began referring to themselves as "geisha girls" to members of the American military occupying Japan.

==== Post-war geisha ====
In 1945, the karyūkai saw restrictions on its practices lifted with teahouses, bars, and geisha houses (okiya) allowed to open again. Though many geisha did not return to the hanamachi after the war, it was evident that working as a geisha was still considered to be a lucrative and viable career, with numbers increasing quickly. The vast majority of geisha after the war were aged 20–24, as many retired in their mid-twenties after finding a patron – a trend carried over from the pre-war karyūkai:

I showed the mother of the Yamabuki [okiya, in 1975] some statistics on the age distribution of the geisha population in the 1920s. She remarked on the big dip in figures when women reached the age of twenty-five. "In those days, when you found yourself a patron you could stop working. If you were lucky you would be set up in your own apartment and have a life of leisure, taking lessons when you wanted to for your own enjoyment ... I think it's pretty unusual nowadays for a geisha to stop working when she gets a patron."

The status of geisha in Japanese society also changed drastically after the war. Throughout the 1920s and 1930s, much discussion had taken place surrounding the status of geisha in a rapidly-Westernising Japanese society. Some geisha had begun to experiment with wearing Western clothing to engagements, learning Western-style dancing, and serving cocktails to customers instead of sake. The image of a "modern" pre-war geisha had been viewed by some as unprofessional and a betrayal of the profession's image, but as a necessary change and an obvious evolution by others. However, the incumbent pressures of the war rapidly turned the tide against Westernisation, leading to an effective abandonment of most radical "Western-style" geisha experiments. (Note: Despite this, a few changes – such as the standardisation of a geisha's fees – did withstand, and remain in place to this day.)

After the war, geisha unanimously returned to wearing kimono and practicing the traditional arts, abandoning all experimental geisha styles of appearance and entertainment. This, however, led to the final blow for the profession's reputation as fashionable in wider society; though the geisha did not experience the rapid decline and eventual death that courtesans had experienced in the previous century, they were instead rendered as "protectors of tradition" in favour of preserving the image geisha had cultivated over time.

Nonetheless, in the decades after the war, the profession's practices still underwent some changes. Following the introduction of the Prostitution Prevention Law in 1956, geisha benefited from the official criminalisation of practices such as mizuage, a practice that had at times been undertaken coercively or through force by some maiko in mostly pre-war Japan. Despite this, the misconception of geisha being on some level prostitutes and of mizuage being a common practice continues, inaccurately, to this day.

After Japan lost the war, geisha dispersed and the profession was in shambles. When they regrouped during the Occupation and began to flourish in the 1960s during Japan's postwar economic boom, the geisha world changed. In modern Japan, girls are not sold into indentured service. Nowadays, a geisha's sex life is her private affair.

From the 1930s onwards, the rise of the jokyū bar hostess began to overshadow geisha as the premiere profession of entertainment at parties and outings for men. In 1959, the Standard-Examiner reported the plight of geisha in an article written for the magazine Bungei Shunju by Japanese businessman Tsûsai Sugawara. Sugawara stated that girls now "prefer[red] to become dancers, models, and cabaret and bar hostesses rather than start [the] training in music and dancing at the age of seven or eight" necessary to become geisha at the time.

Compulsory education laws passed in the 1960s effectively shortened the period of training for geisha apprentices, as girls could no longer be taken on at a young age to be trained throughout their teenage years. This led to a decline in women entering the profession, as most okiya required a recruit to be at least somewhat competent and trained in the arts she would later go on to use as a geisha; by about 1975, okiya mothers in Kyoto began accepting both recruits from different areas of Japan in larger numbers, and recruits with little to no previous experience in the traditional arts. Before this point, the number of maiko in had dropped from 80 to just 30 between 1965 and 1975.

By 1975, the average age of a geisha in the Ponto-chō district of Kyoto was roughly 39, with the vast majority being aged 35–49. The population of geisha at this time was also surprisingly high, roughly equivalent to the numbers of young women within the profession; geisha no longer retired young when they found a patron, and were less likely than other women of the same age to have both children and an extended family to support them. In 1989, it was reported in the New York Times that there were an estimated 600-700 geisha left throughout the whole of Japan.

==== Present-day geisha ====
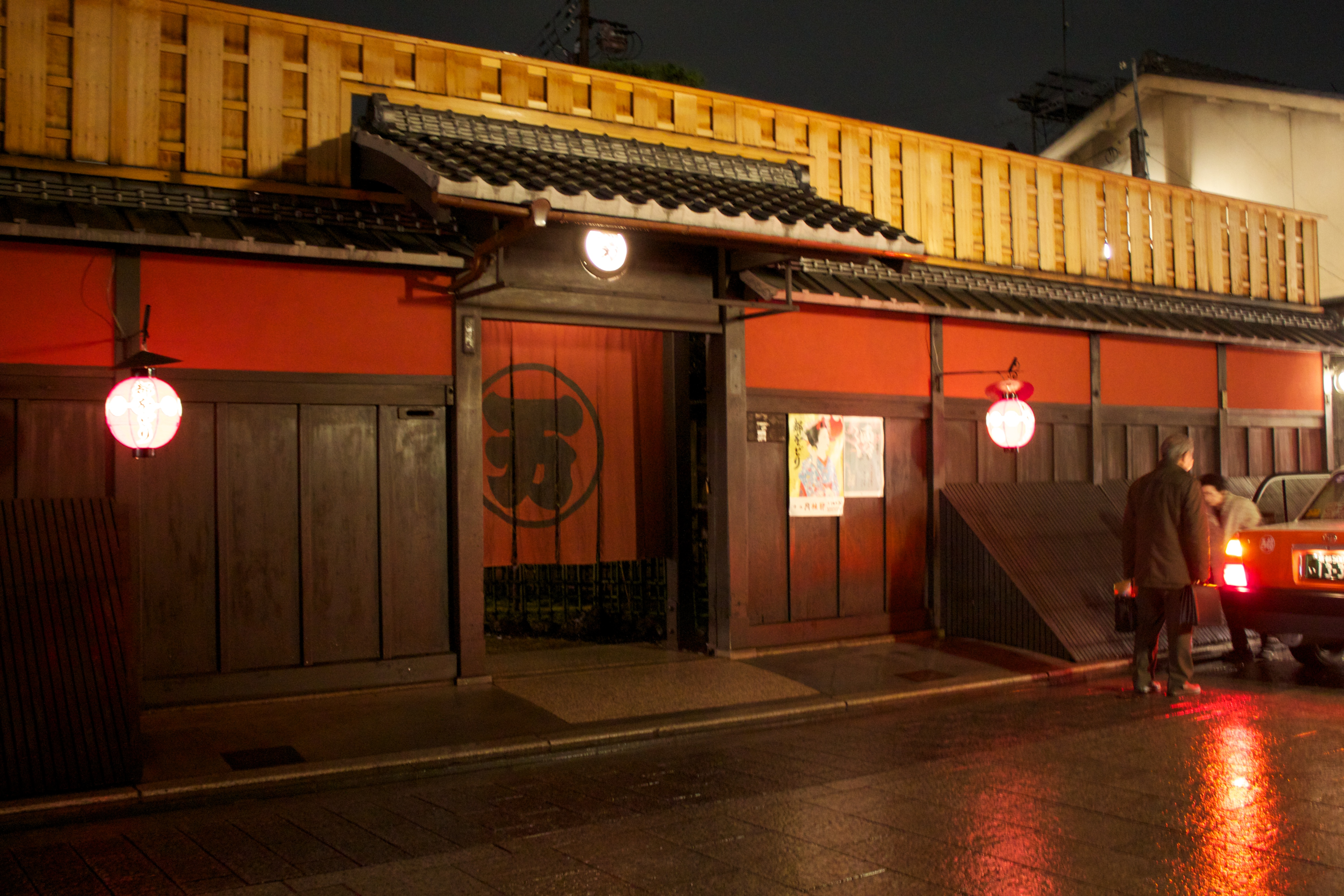
Entrance to Ichiriki Ochaya, one of the most famous tea houses where geisha entertain in Gion Kobu

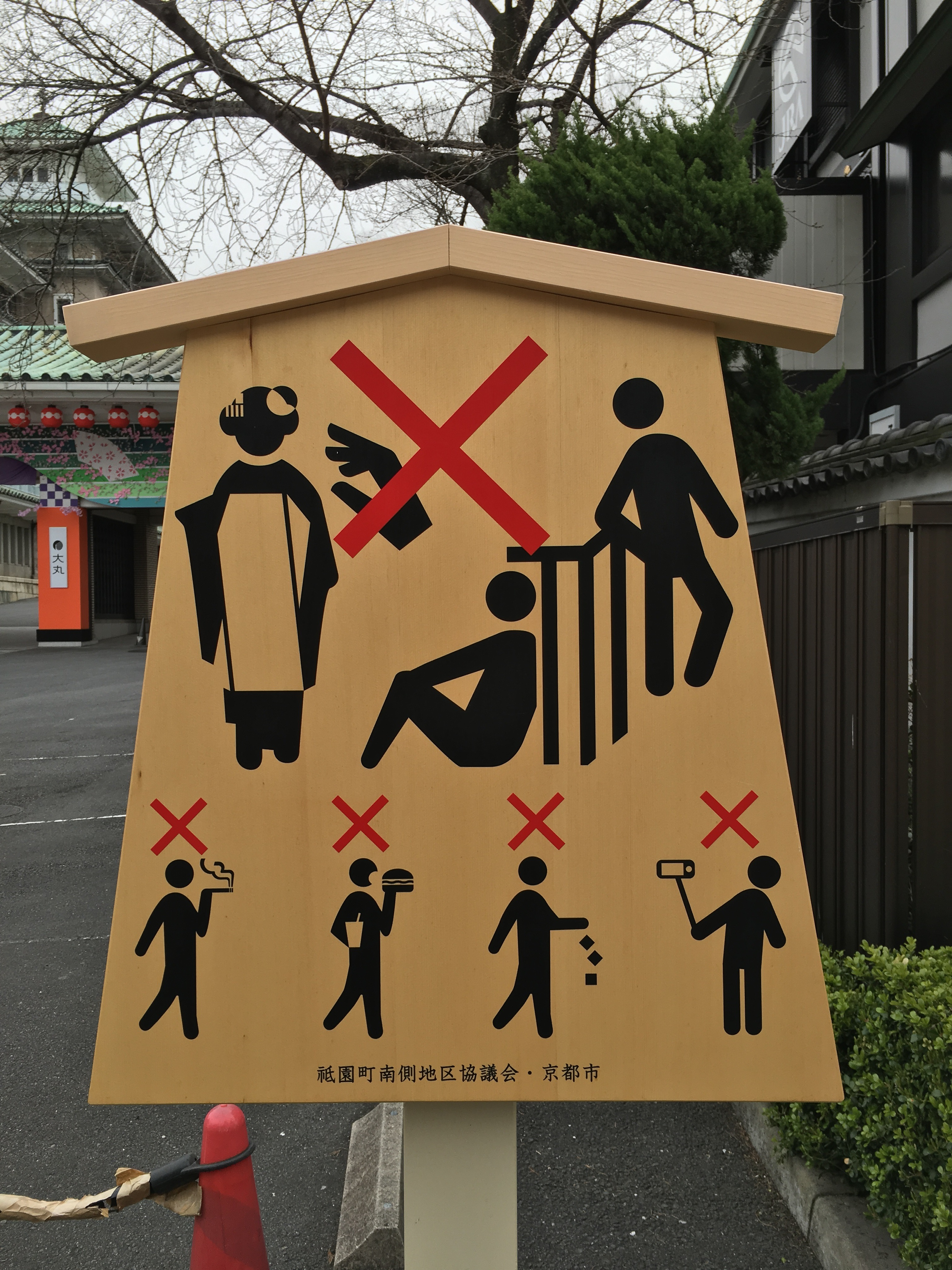
A sign warning tourists not to harass maiko in Gion, Kyoto

Modern geisha mostly still live in okiya they are affiliated with, particularly during their apprenticeship, and are legally required to be registered to one, though they may not live there every day. Many experienced geisha are successful enough to choose to live independently, though living independently is more common in some geisha districts – such as those in Tokyo – than others.

Geisha are often hired to attend parties and gatherings, traditionally at tea houses or traditional Japanese restaurants (ryōtei). The charge for a geisha's time, previously determined by the time it took to burn one incense stick (known as senkōdai (線香代, "incense stick fee")) or gyokudai (玉代, "jewel fee"), was modernised during the 19th-century to a flat fee charged per hour. In Kyoto, the terms ohana (お花) and hanadai (花代) (both meaning "flower fees") are used instead as part of the Kyoto dialect. However, appointments and arrangements are still made by the mother of the house (the okasan) through the official registry office (検番, kenban), which keeps a record of both the appointments taken by a geisha and her schedule.

In modern Japan, geisha and their apprentices are a rarer sight outside of the hanamachi or chayagai (茶屋街, "tea house district", often referred to as "entertainment district"); most sightings of geisha and maiko in and around cities such as Kyoto are actually tourists who pay a fee to be dressed up as either a maiko or geisha for the day, a practice known as henshin. (Note: Henshin studios are required to dress paying customers inaccurately if they wish to appear in costume in public, so that tourists and working maiko and geisha are visually distinct from one another.)

Over time the number of geisha has declined, despite the efforts of those within the profession. Factors include the nature of the economy, declining interest in the traditional arts, the exclusive and closed-off nature of the karyūkai, and the expense of being entertained by geisha. (Note: "An economic downturn in the 1990s forced businessmen to cut back on entertainment expenses, while high-profile scandals in recent years have made politicians eschew excessive spending. A dinner can cost around 80,000 yen (US$1,058) per head, depending on the venue and the number of geishas present. But even before the 90s, men were steadily giving up on late-night parties at ryotei, restaurants with traditional straw-mat tatami rooms where geisha entertain, in favour of the modern comforts of hostess bars and karaoke rooms.") The number of maiko and geisha in Kyoto fell from 76 and 548 in 1965 respectively to just 71 and 202 in 2006 as a result.

However, following the advent of wider accessibility to the internet from the mid-2000s onwards, a greater number of recruits have decided to join the profession with no existing ties to the karyūkai through watching online documentaries and reading websites set up by okiya to promote their business; documentary pieces commonly inspire young women to join the profession, such as the geisha Satsuki, who later became the most popular geisha in Gion for a seven-year period:

[Geisha] Satsuki first took an interest in the kagai while a middle school student in Osaka, at around the age of 14, after seeing a documentary about a maiko's training. "I already had heard of maiko, but it was when I saw the documentary that I thought – I want to do that."

In recent years, a growing number of geisha have complained to the authorities about being pursued and harassed by groups of tourists keen to take their photograph when out walking. As a result, tourists in Kyoto have been warned not to harass geisha on the streets, with local residents of the city and businesses in the areas surrounding the hanamachi of Kyoto launching patrols throughout Gion in order to prevent tourists from doing so.

In 2020, to address the income reduction among the Geisha community caused by the social distancing measures of COVID-19, a project called "Meet Geisha" was launched. Originally conceived as a way to bring groups of tourists to experience Geisha performances in a more relaxed and less intimidating setting, the initiative was introduced by an IT firm with the aim of capitalizing on an anticipated influx of tourists, including those visiting for the Tokyo 2020 Olympics. The online presence of Geisha culture extended beyond the project's Zoom calls and gained global popularity, bolstered by internationally acclaimed movies and TV shows such as Memoirs of a Geisha and Shōgun, as well as platforms like Roblox, among others.

== Appearance ==
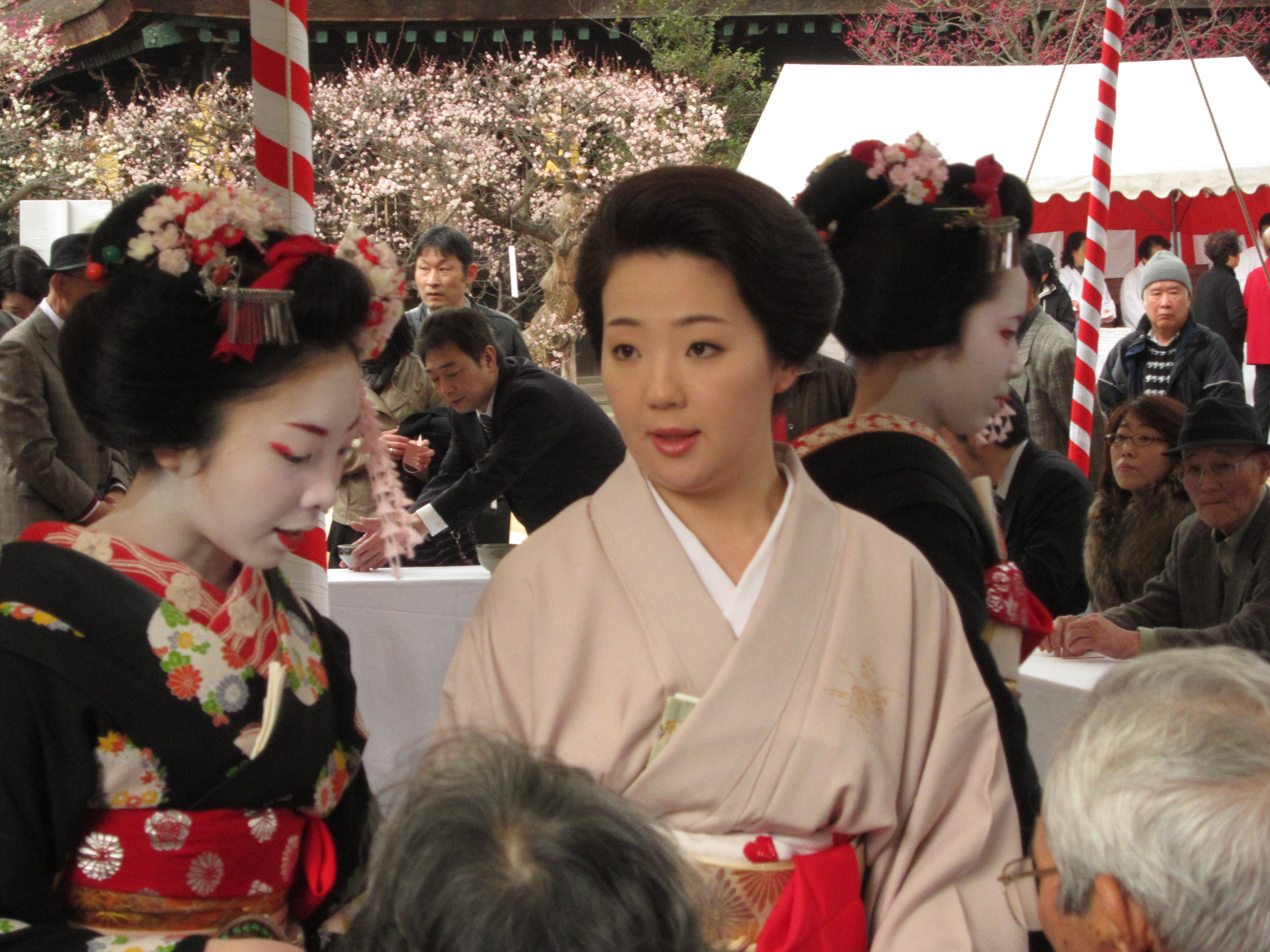
Mature geisha (center) ordinarily wear subdued clothing, makeup, and hair, contrasting with the more colourful clothing, heavy makeup, and elaborate hair of maiko (apprentices; left and right).

A geisha's appearance changes symbolically throughout her career, representing her training and seniority. Apprentice geisha typically appear in one style of dress, the most formal, the entire time they are working: a long-sleeved kimono with a trailing skirt, a formal obi which may be extremely long, full white makeup and a traditional hairstyle, which is done using the apprentice's own hair. A geisha, in contrast, may not be called to wear her most formal outfit (a trailing kuromontsuki with an obi of matching formality, a wig and full white makeup) to every engagement.

Though apprentice geisha appear in their most formal dress when attending engagements all of the time, this appearance is not static, and the seniority of apprentices can generally be distinguished visually by changes to makeup, hairstyle and hair accessories. When an apprentice becomes a full geisha, her style of kimono changes from a long-sleeved one with a typically long obi to a short-sleeved one with an obi of the same length worn by any woman who wears a kimono; she may not wear a kimono with a trailing skirt to every banquet, and may choose not to wear white makeup and a wig at all as she grows older.

Changes, and style of appearance, vary depending on the region of Japan a geisha or apprentice geisha works in; however, there is a general progression of appearance that can be seen as applicable to all geisha.

=== Makeup ===
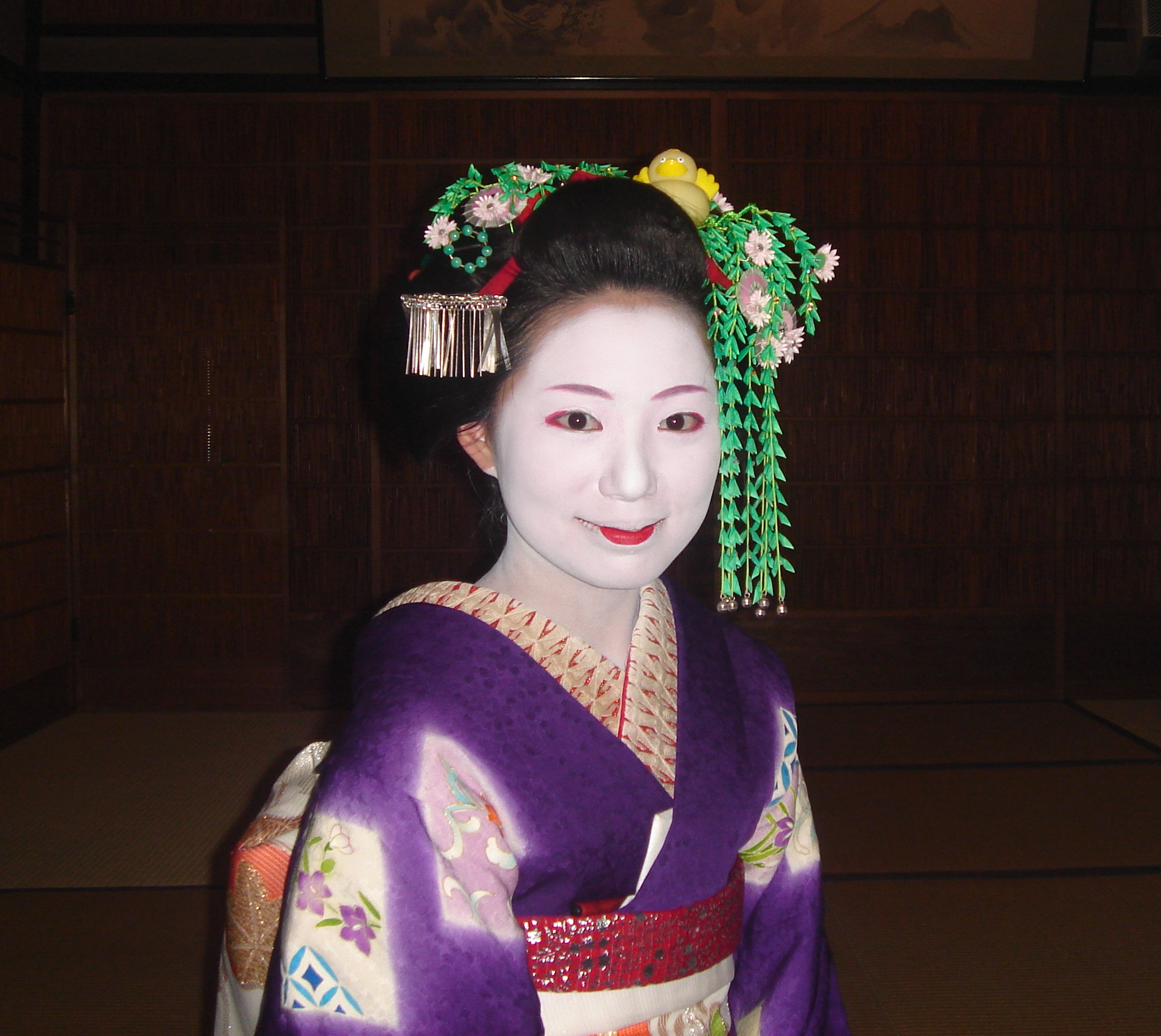
Maiko Mamechiho of Gion. Notice the green pin on the mid-left known as tsunagi-dango: this identifies her as a maiko of Gion Kobu under 18.

Both maiko and geisha wear traditional white foundation known as oshiroi. In the past, this white makeup – formerly made with lead – would have illuminated the face of a geisha when the only lighting available was candlelight. Oshiroi is worn with red and black eye and eyebrow makeup, red lips and light pink blusher. Both maiko and geisha underpaint their lips with a red lipstick known as beni.

First-year apprentice geisha paint only the lower lip, and wear less black around the eyes and eyebrows than senior maiko. Younger apprentices may also paint their eyebrows slightly shorter or rounder to emphasise a youthful appearance. Maiko wear noticeably more blush – known as tonoko – than geisha. Young apprentices may have the mother of the house or their "older sister" mentors help them apply makeup.

Geisha wear more black around the eyes and eyebrows than maiko. Older geisha tend only to wear a full face of traditional white makeup during stage performances or on special occasions. Older geisha generally stop wearing oshiroi around the same time they stop wearing hikizuri to parties.

For a short period before becoming a geisha, maiko in some geisha districts colour their teeth black, usually accompanied by wearing the sakkō hairstyle and a decorated black formal kimono. Teeth blackening was once a common practice amongst married women in Japan and the imperial court in earlier times, but is now an extremely uncommon practice.

=== Dress ===
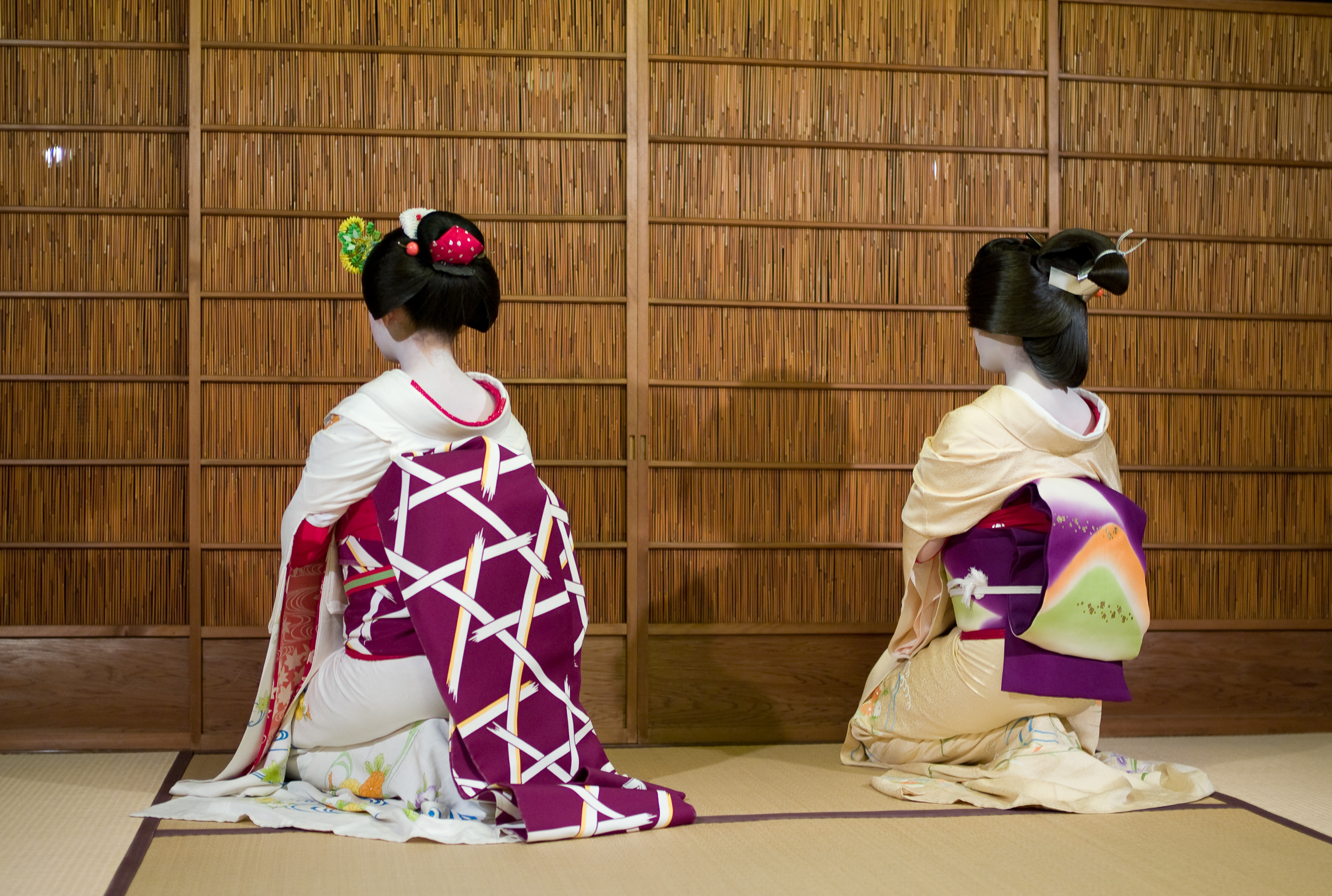
A senior maiko (left) wearing a long darari obi and a geisha (right) wearing an obi in the taiko-musubi style

Geisha and maiko always wear kimono while working, and typically wear kimono outside of work. The type of kimono varies based on age, occasion, region and season of the year.

==== Maiko ====
Both maiko and geisha wear the collar on their kimono relatively far back, accentuating (for maiko) the red collar of the underkimono (juban), and displaying (for both maiko and geisha) the two or three stripes of bare skin (eri-ashi and sanbon-ashi respectively) left just underneath the hairline when wearing oshiroi.

Both geisha and apprentice geisha typically wear kimono known as hikizuri (also known as susohiki, which have extra-long, trailing hems. These kimono feature a collar set further back into the neck, and sleeves attached unevenly to the body of the kimono. These features allow the collar to be pulled further down the back when worn, with the sleeves – which, like all women's kimono, feature an open portion underneath the shoulder – offset on the shoulder to ensure that the underarm is not exposed awkwardly through the open inner side of the sleeve.

Hikizuri are formal kimono, and are almost invariably made of fine silk. Their patterns generally follow the placement of motifs on formal kimono such as hōmongi and irotomesode, with motifs asymmetrically placed along the hem and along the shoulders. (Note: An exception to this general rule would be hikizuri dyed in the bingata style, featuring small, all-over motifs resembling a komon. Though similar to a komon in appearance, bingata hikizuri are still considered formal clothing, and are only ever made of fine silk.) For extremely formal occasions, black hikizuri that resemble kurotomesode are seen.

Because they are formal clothes, informal fabrics, such as slubbed silk, cotton, linen and polyester, are not used for hikizuri. As with regular women's kimono, hikizuri are lined for most of the year, and unlined for the summer months; in winter, heavier formal fabrics such as rinzu may be used, and in summer, lightweight silk weaves such as ro (a plain weave with interspersed lines of leno weave) may be worn. When off-duty, if wearing kimono, both geisha and their apprentices wear regular, non-trailing kimono.

Maiko wear hikizuri with furisode-style sleeves, with a tuck sewn into either sleeve, and a tuck sewn into each shoulder. These tucks are holdovers from a time when maiko spent most of their teenage years as apprentices; the tucks would be let out as they grew. These tucks are still seen on some children's kimono.

Maiko hikizuri tend to be colourful and highly decorated, often featuring a design that continues inside the kimono's hem. The style of this kimono varies throughout different regions; apprentices in Kyoto tend to wear large but sparsely-placed motifs, whereas apprentices elsewhere appear in kimono similar to a regular furisode, with small, busy patterns that cover a greater area. Unlike geisha, who almost invariably own the kimono they wear to engagements, apprentice geisha tend not to own their own kimono, and instead borrow those of their okiya.

This is because brand-new formal maiko hikizuri are extremely expensive, and are unlikely to be something an apprentice can afford. An apprentice may also decide not to become a geisha and drop out, leaving them with an expensive piece of clothing their okiya cannot use for its other apprentices. As such, many okiya have several kimono and obi used by their apprentices that have been used for several years, and some are known for their distinctive designs.

Ex-maiko pieces may be sold on when they are considered too worn for use in formal engagements, or when an okiya closes and decides to sell its stock of kimono and obi. In such circumstances, it is sometimes possible to identify the okiya a piece previously belonged to, as in the case of darari obi, the okiya's crest is woven, dyed or embroidered into one end of the obi.

Apprentices wear long, formal obi. For apprentices in Kyoto this is almost always a darari (lit. 'dangling') obi, a type of obi roughly 6 metres (20 ft) long, but elsewhere may be the shorter and narrower fukuro obi. Darari obi are always worn in a knot showing off the length, whereas apprentices elsewhere wear fukura-suzume and han-dara (lit. 'half-dangling') knots. When wearing casual kimono in off-duty settings, an apprentice may still wear a nagoya obi, even with a yukata.

Apprentices wear either zōri or okobo with their kimono, with okobo being worn (in Kyoto at least) with all formal kimono. For training and in everyday life, zōri are worn, even when wearing casual short-sleeved kimono such as komon and yukata.

==== Geisha ====
Geisha wear kimono more subdued in pattern and colour than both regular women's kimono, and the kimono worn by apprentice geisha. Geisha always wear short-sleeved kimono, even if they are technically still young enough to wear furisode, as the wearing of furisode-style sleeves is considered a marker of apprenticeship.

Not all geisha wear hikizuri; older geisha tend to wear regular formal kimono to engagements, with no trailing skirt or deep-set collar. The appearance of regional geisha varies less across Japan so than that of apprentice geisha.

Geisha wear their obi in the nijuudaiko musubi style – a taiko musubi (drum knot) tied with a fukuro obi; geisha from Tokyo and Kanazawa also wear their obi in the yanagi musubi (willow knot) style and the tsunodashi musubi style. Though geisha may wear hakata-ori obi in the summer months, geisha from Fukuoka – where the fabric originates from – may wear it the entire year.

Geisha exclusively wear solid white han-eri, and wear either geta or zōri when wearing kimono.

=== Hair ===
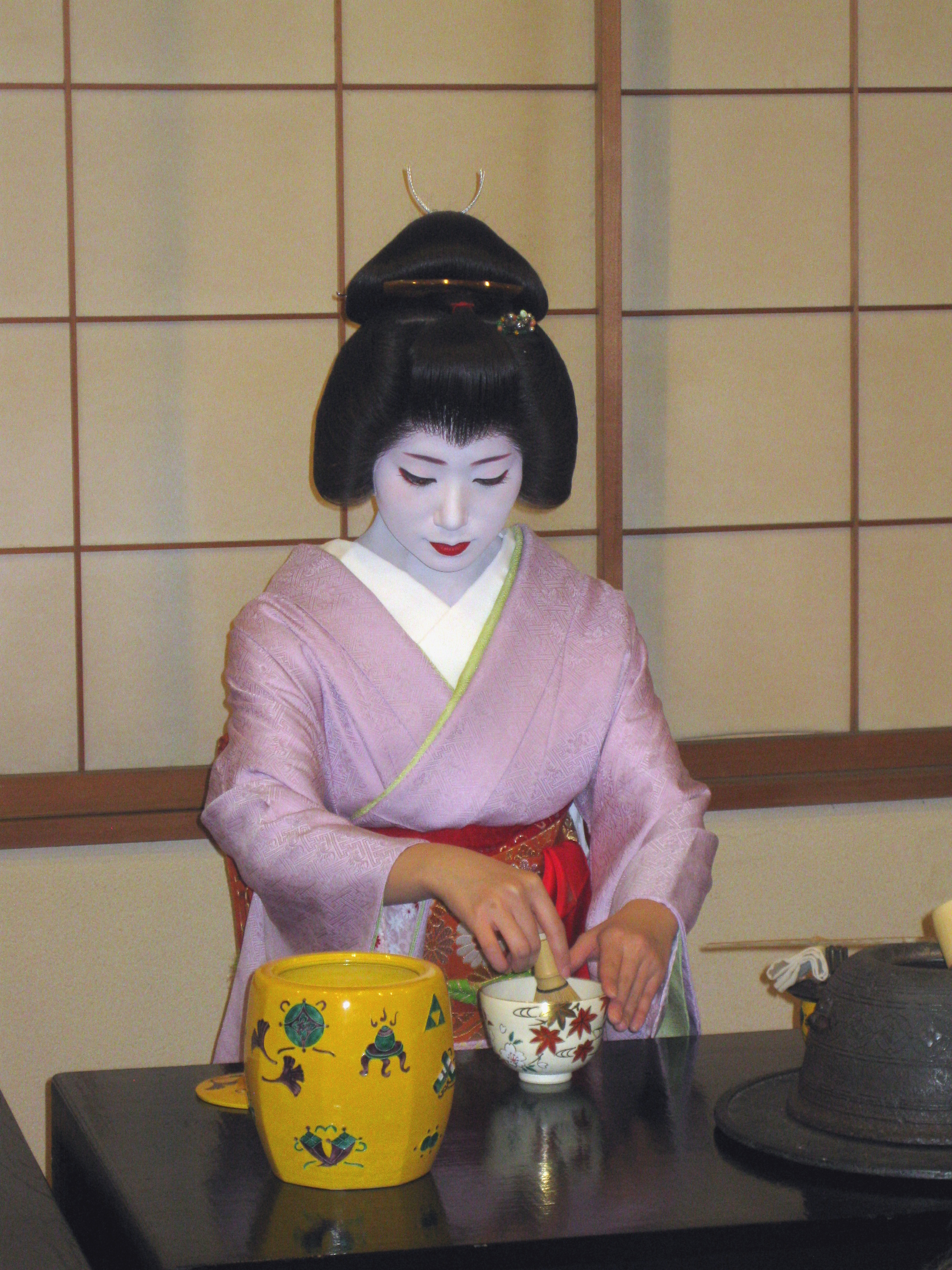
Mamechiho as a geisha

The hairstyles of geisha have varied throughout history. During the 17th century, the shimada hairstyle developed, which became the basis for the hairstyles worn by both geisha and maiko. When the profession of geisha first came into existence, dress edicts prevented geisha from wearing the dramatic hairstyles worn by courtesans, leading to the subdued nature of most geisha hairstyles.

Following World War II, many of the hairstylists who had previously served the karyūkai no longer operated, leading to the redevelopment of hairstyles for geisha and maiko. Geisha, unable to reliably book in with a hairstylist once a week to maintain their hair, began to wear human hair wigs in the shimada style that required restyling far less. The hairstyles of maiko, still utilizing the apprentice's own hair, became wider, placed higher upon the head, and shorter in length.

There are five different hairstyles that a maiko wears, which mark the different stages of her apprenticeship. The nihongami hairstyle with kanzashi hair ornaments are most closely associated with maiko, who spend hours each week at the hairdresser and sleep on special pillows (takamakura) to preserve the elaborate styling. Maiko can develop a bald spot on their crown caused by the stress of wearing these hairstyles almost every day, but in the present day, this is less likely to happen because maiko begin their apprenticeship at a later age. Maiko in certain districts of Kyoto may also wear additional, differing hairstyles in the run up to graduating as a geisha.

In the present day, geisha wear a variety of the shimada known as the chū taka shimada – a flattened, sleeker version of the bunkin taka shimada worn as a bridal wig in traditional weddings. Though geisha also wear this hairstyle as a wig, it is usually shaped specifically to their face by a wig stylist. Older geisha may wear the tsubushi taka shimada style on special occasions, featuring a flatter "bun" (mage) than both the bunkin taka shimada and chū taka shimada styles.

Both the hairstyles of maiko and geisha are decorated with hair combs and hairpins (kanzashi), with geisha wearing far fewer kanzashi than maiko. The style and colour of hair accessories worn with some maiko hairstyles can signify the stage of an apprentice's training. Typical combs and hairpins may be made of tortoiseshell or mock-tortoiseshell, gold, silver and semi-precious stones such as jade and coral.

== Traditional performances ==
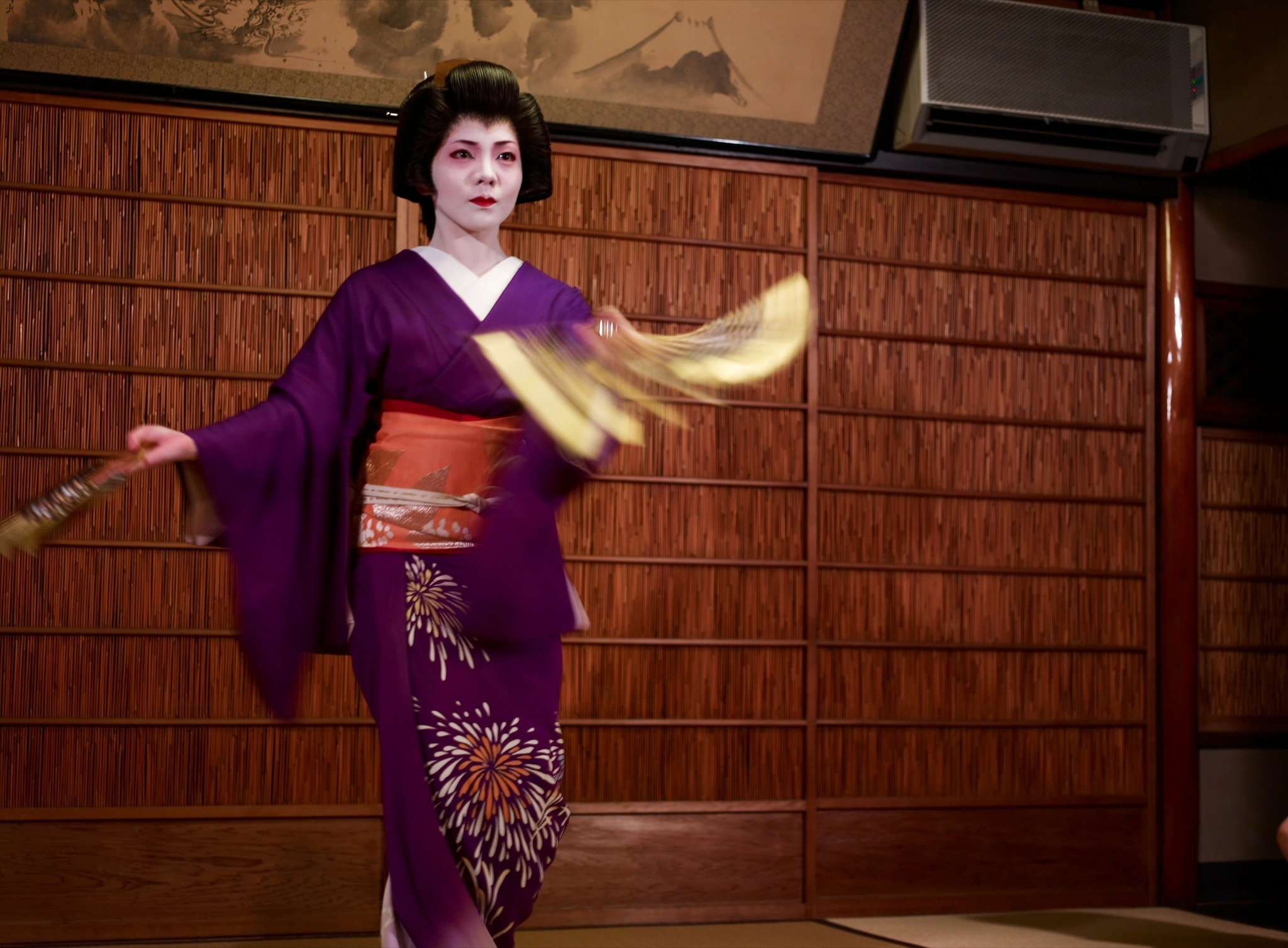
Geisha are skilled artists, trained in and performing music and dance.

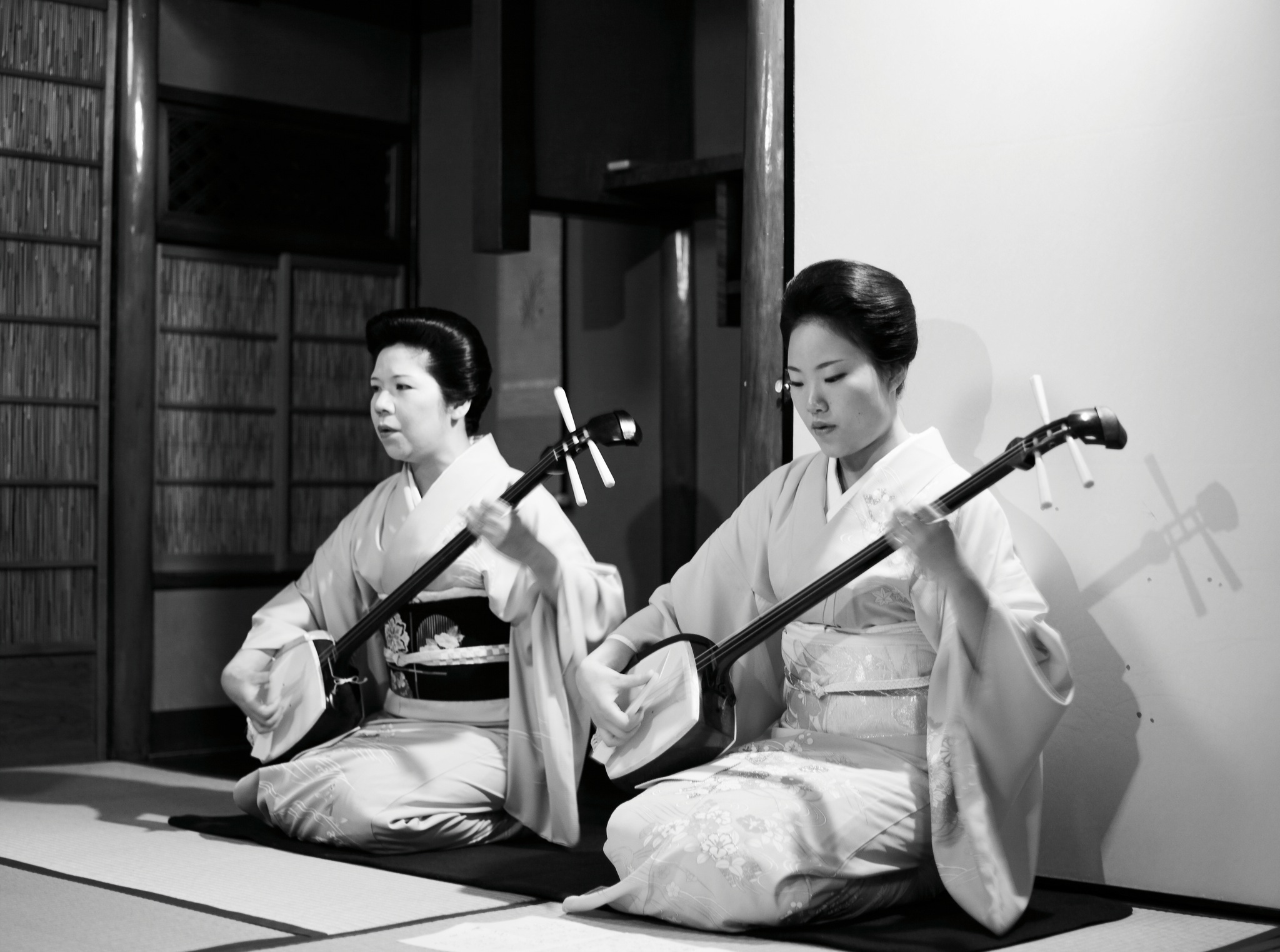
Geisha Komomo and Mameyoshi from Gion Kobu playing the shamisen

Geisha entertain their guests with a combination of both their hostessing and conversational skills, and their skills in traditional Japanese art forms of dance, music and singing. Before deciding to begin a career as a geisha, new recruits are generally expected to have an interest in the arts, as well as some experience. As geisha numbers have fallen throughout the decades, this is no longer a strict prerequisite. Some okiya will take on recruits with no previous experience, with some young geisha, despite having existing experience, expected to begin their lessons from the beginning.

The style of dance practiced by geisha today evolved from dance styles used in both nōh and kabuki theatre. Over time, the more exaggerated theatrical styles evolved into the subtle and more stylised form of dancing used today; despite the difference, elements of traditional Japanese dance, such as the use of gestures to tell a story and the symbolism used to represent this, run throughout both as a common feature.

These dances are accompanied by traditional Japanese music. The primary instrument used by geisha to accompany dance is the shamisen, a banjo-like three-stringed instrument played with a plectrum. Originating in China as the sanxian, it was introduced to Japan first through Korea, and then the Ryukyu Islands in the 1560s, obtaining its current form within a century. The shamisen soon became the mainstay instrument of geisha entertainment in the 1750s. It is described as having a distinct and melancholic sound, with traditional shamisen music using only minor thirds and sixths in its composition.

All geisha must learn to play the shamisen, alongside additional instruments that often accompany the shamisen, such as the ko-tsuzumi (small shoulder drum) and fue (flute), during their apprenticeship, as well as learning traditional Japanese dance; however, after graduation to geisha status, geisha are free to choose which art form they wish to pursue primarily. Geisha who pursue musicianship are known as jikata (地方, "ground [seated, when playing instruments and singing] person") geisha, whereas geisha who pursue dance are known as tachikata (立方, "standing person") geisha. Some geisha not only dance and play music, but also write poems, paint pictures, or compose music.

=== Public performances ===
While traditionally geisha led a cloistered existence, in recent years they have become more publicly visible, and entertainment is available without requiring the traditional introduction and connections.

The most visible form of this are public dances, or odori (generally written in traditional kana spelling as をどり, rather than modern おどり), featuring both maiko and geisha. All the Kyoto hanamachi hold these annually (mostly in spring, with one exclusively in autumn), dating to the Kyoto exhibition of 1872, and there are many performances, with tickets being inexpensive, ranging from around ¥1500 to ¥7000 – top-price tickets also include an optional tea ceremony (tea and wagashi served by maiko) before the performance. Other hanamachi also hold public dances, including some in Tokyo, but have fewer performances.

At the Kitano Tenman-gū shrine there is an annual open-air tea ceremony (野点, nodate) during the plum-blossom festival (梅花祭, baikasai) every February 25. During this ceremony, geisha and maiko from the Kamishichiken district in northwest Kyoto serve tea to 3,000 guests. As of 2010, they also serve beer in a beer garden at the Kamishichiken Kaburenjo Theatre during the summer months. Another geisha beer garden is available at the Gion Shinmonso ryokan in the Gion district. These beer gardens also feature traditional dances by the geisha in the evenings.

== Training process ==
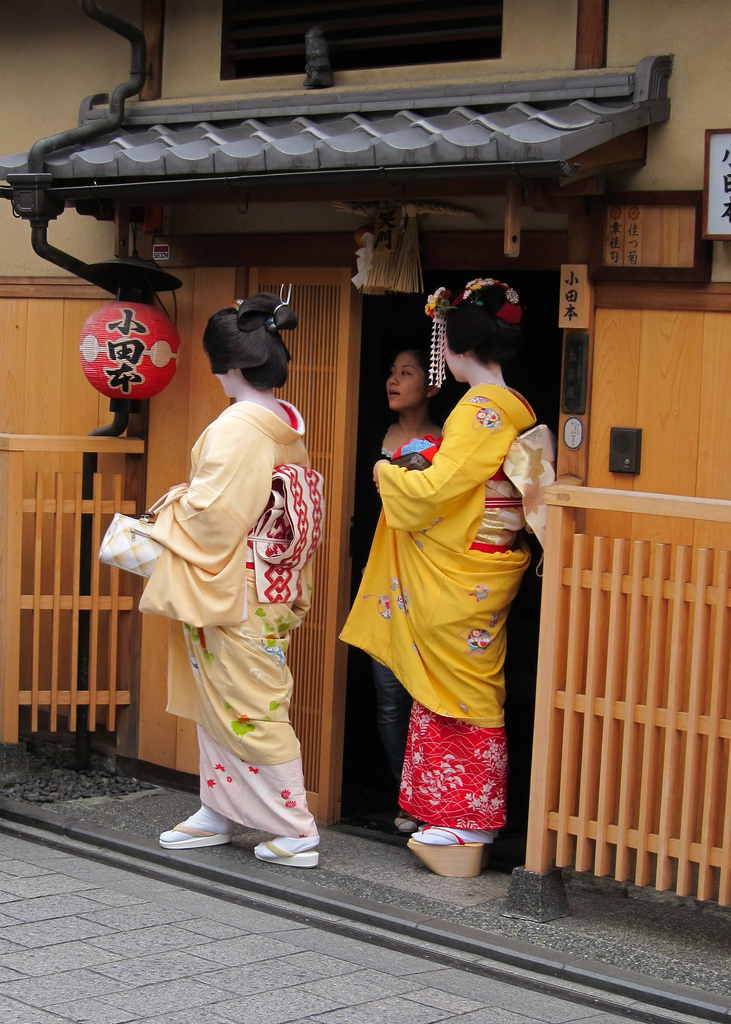
Kyoto geiko Fumikazu with her minarai imōto Momokazu, and a shikomi from the Odamoto okiya

Before the 20th century, geisha began their training at a young age, around the age of six. In the present day this is no longer the case, and geisha usually debut as maiko around the age of 17 or 18. Labour laws stipulate that apprentices only join an okiya aged 18, although okiya in Kyoto are legally allowed to take on recruits at a younger age, 15–17. Now, girls must graduate from middle school and then make the personal decision to train to become a geisha. Young women who wish to become geisha now most often begin their training after high school or even college. Many more women begin their careers in adulthood.

Before debuting as a maiko, apprentices may live at the okiya as shikomi – essentially a trainee, learning all the necessary skills to become a maiko, as well as attending to the needs of the house and learning to live with her geisha sisters and within the karyūkai. By watching other geisha and learning from the mother of the house (known as the okā-san (lit. 'mother')), apprentices learn how to speak with guests, the mannerisms necessary to be a geisha, and the traditions of the karyūkai. Apprentices also learn how to comfortably wear kimono.

Traditionally the shikomi stage of training lasted for years, and some girls were bonded to geisha houses as children. Daughters of geisha were often brought up as geisha themselves, usually as the successor (atotori, meaning "heir" or "heiress") or daughter-role (musume-bun) to the okiya. Successors were not always blood relations. Now, a girl is often a shikomi for up to a year.

A maiko is an apprentice and is therefore bonded under a contract to her okiya. The okiya will usually supply her with food, board, kimono, obi, and other tools of her trade, but a maiko may decide to fund everything herself from the beginning with either a loan or the help of an outside guarantor. A maiko's training is very expensive, and debts must be repaid over time with her earnings to either the okiya or her guarantor. This repayment may continue after graduation to geishahood, and only when her debts are settled can a geisha claim her entire wages and work independently (if loaning from the okiya). After this point she may choose to stay on living at her okiya, must still be affiliated to one to work, and even living away from the okiya, will usually commute there to begin her working evening.

A maiko will start her formal training on the job as a minarai (a name meaning "learning by observation") at an ozashiki (お座敷, a geisha party), where she will sit and observe as the other maiko and geisha interact with customers. In this way, a trainee gains insights into the nature of the job, following the typical nature of traditional arts apprenticeships in Japan, wherein an apprentice is expected to learn almost entirely through observation. Although geisha at the stage of minarai training will attend parties, they will not participate on an involved level and are instead expected to sit quietly.

Trainees can be hired for parties, but are usually uninvited – though welcomed – guests, brought along by their symbolic older sister as a way of introducing a new trainee to patrons of the karyūkai. Minarai usually charge just a third of the fee a typical geisha would charge, and typically work within just one particular tea house, known as the minarai-jaya – learning from the "mother" (proprietress) of the house. The minarai stage of training involves learning techniques of conversation, typical party games, and proper decorum and behaviour at banquets and parties. This stage lasts only about a month or so.

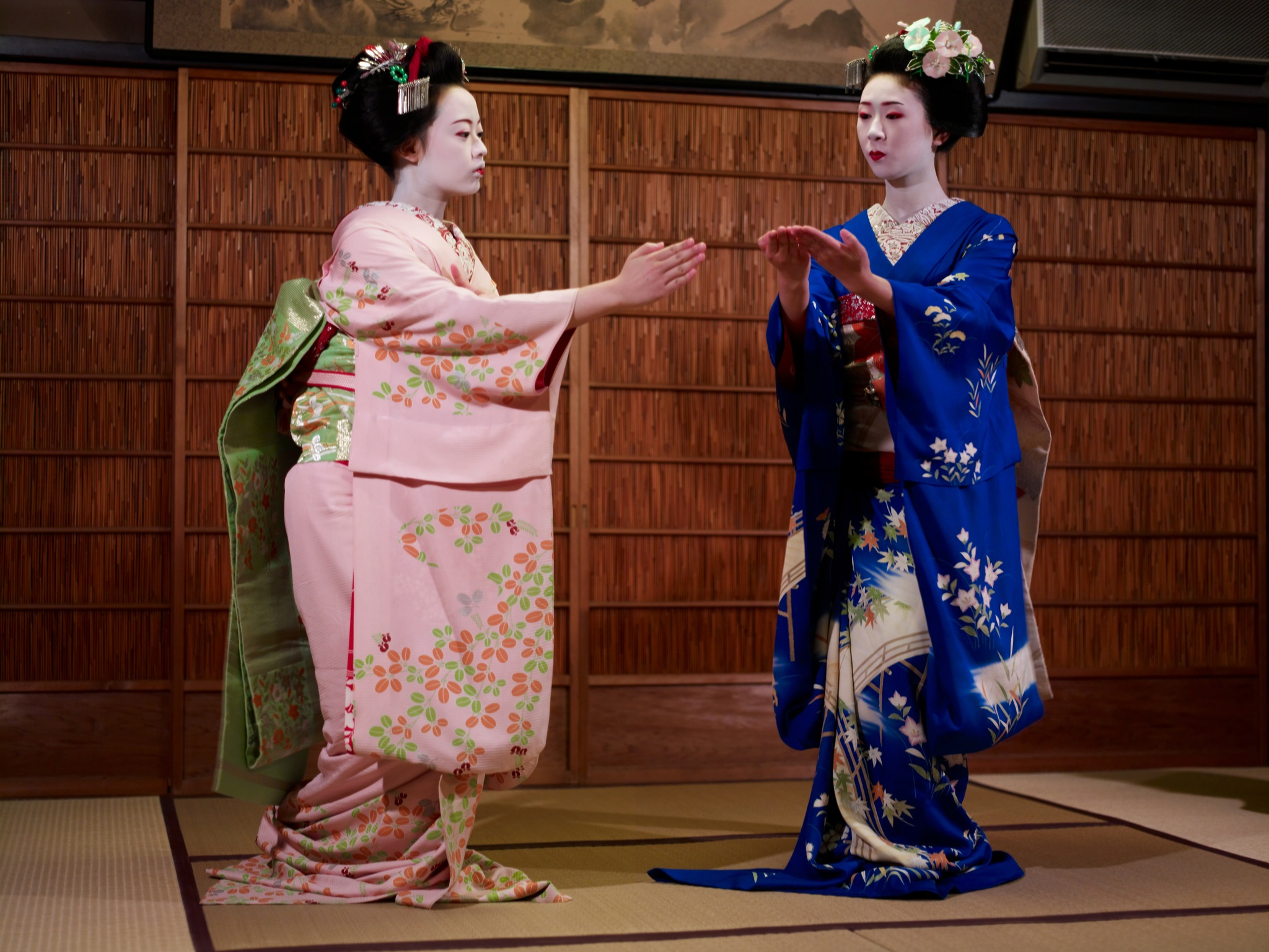
Maiko Katsumi and Mameteru performing the Gion Kouta

After the minarai period, a trainee will make her official debut (misedashi) and become a maiko. This stage can last between three and five years. During this time, they learn from both other trainees senior to them, and their geisha mentors, with special emphasis placed on learning from her symbolic "older sister" (onee-san). Though any maiko or geisha "senior" in rank to an apprentice may be called "older sister", an apprentice's official "older sister" is a geisha bonded to her in an official ceremony, who will thereafter typically teach her about working in the karyūkai. This involves learning how to serve drinks, hold casual conversation, and some training in the arts, though the latter is usually carried out through by dance and music teachers.

There are three major elements of a maiko's training. The first is the formal arts training, which takes place in schools found in every hanamachi. They study traditional instruments: the shamisen, the flute, and drums, as well as learning games, traditional songs, calligraphy, Japanese traditional dances (in the Buyō style), tea ceremony, literature, and poetry.

The second element is the entertainment training which a trainee learns at various tea houses and parties by observing her "older sister". The third is the social skill of navigating the complex social web of the hanamachi; formal greetings, gifts, and visits are key parts of the social structure of the karyūkai, and crucial for the support network necessary to support a trainee's eventual debut as a geisha.

Around the age of 20–21, a maiko will graduate to geisha status in a ceremony known as erikae (turning of the collar).

Following debut, geisha typically do not go through major role changes, as there are no more formal stages of training. However, geisha can and do work into their eighties and nineties, and are still expected to train regularly, though lessons may only be put on a few times a month. A geisha may decide to retire from her work, either to move away from the karyūkai, take on the role of "mother" of an okiya, or to mainly focus on performances and teaching other younger geisha.

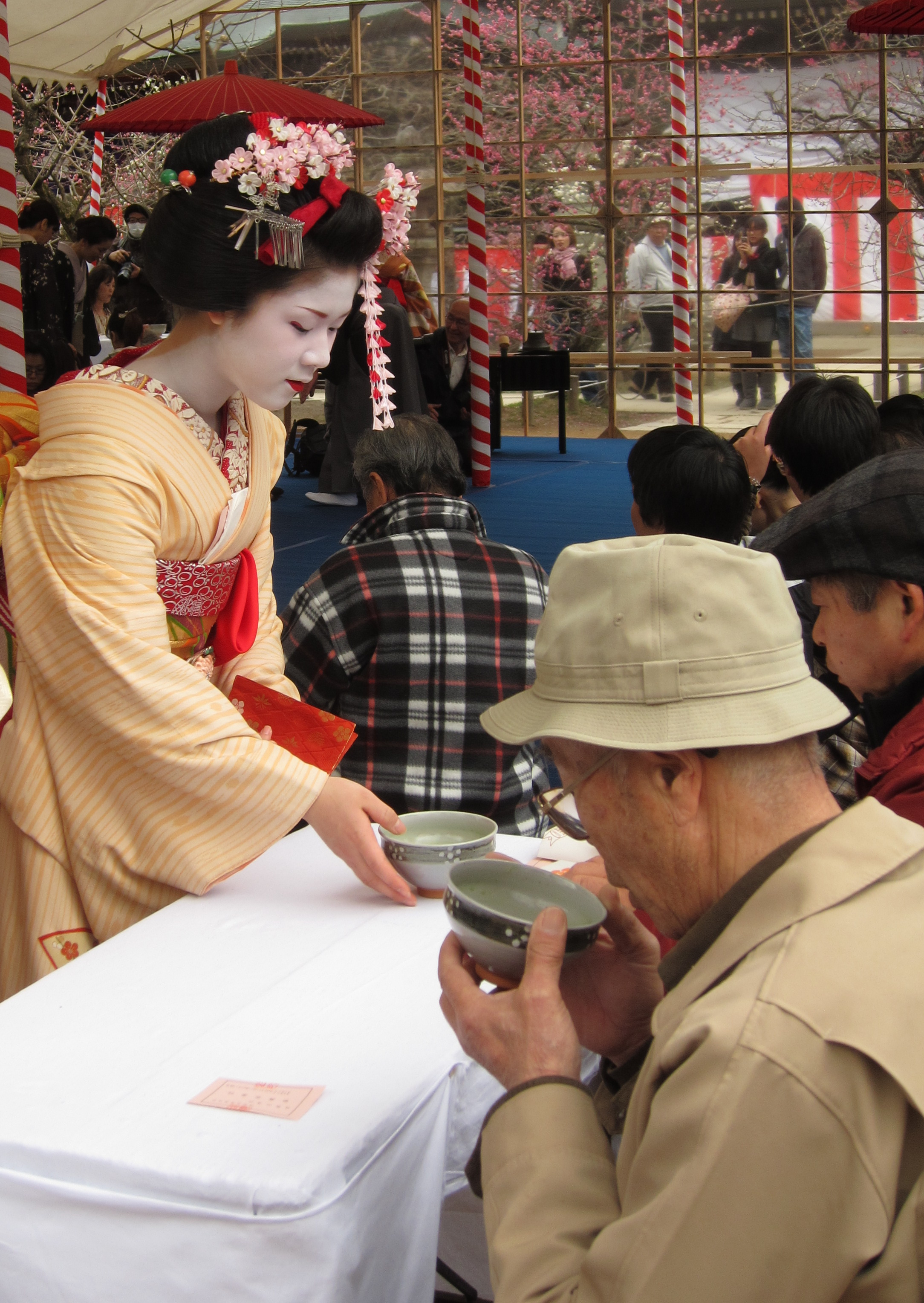
Maiko Satohana from the Kamishichiken district of Kyoto serving tea at Baikasai, the plum blossom festival, at Kitano Tenman-gū

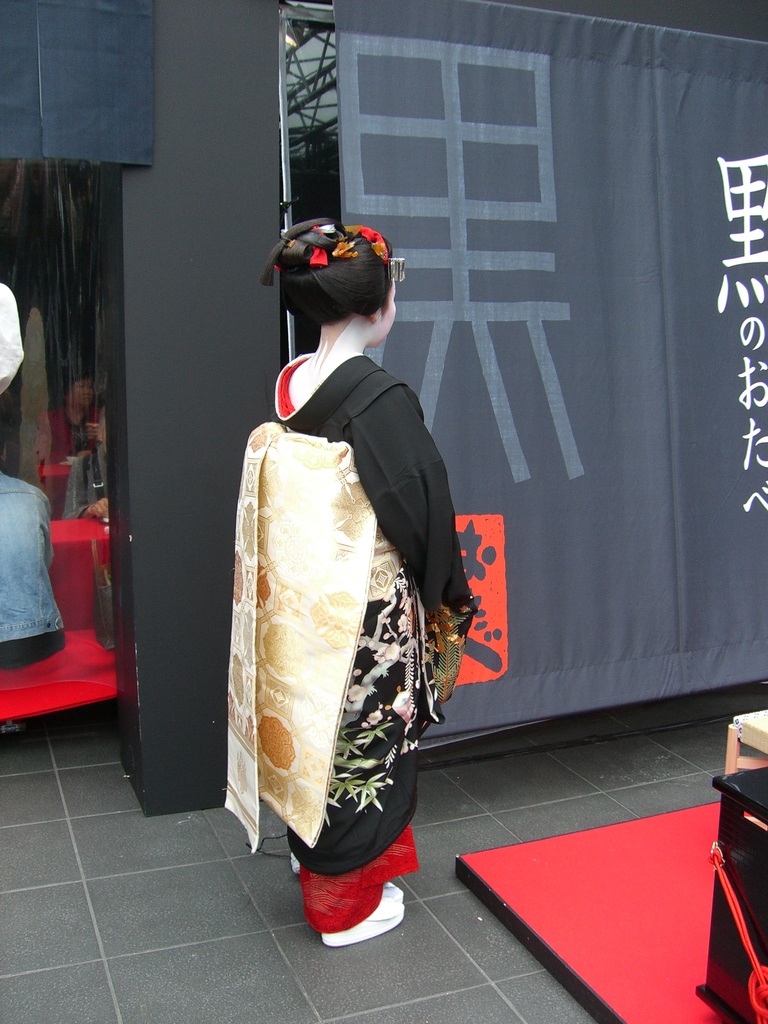
A senior maiko Suzuha wearing sakkō, two weeks before her erikae

=== Non-Japanese geisha ===
Since the 1970s, non-Japanese have also trained as and become geisha. Liza Dalby, an American national, worked and performed briefly with geisha in the Ponto-chō district of Kyoto as part of her doctorate research. She entertained in full costume, was tied to an established okiya, and was assigned an 'older sister'; however, because of the academic nature of her stay, she did not undergo the rites to formally debut as a geisha.

Some foreign nationals who have completed training and worked as geisha in Japan include:

- Fukutarō – (Isabella), a Romanian national who worked in the Izu-Nagaoka district of Shizuoka Prefecture. She began her apprenticeship in April 2010 and debuted a year later in 2011.
- Ibu – (Eve), a geisha of Ukrainian descent working in the Anjō district of Aichi Prefecture. Ibu first became interested in being a geisha in 2000, after visiting Japan for a year to study traditional dance, and came back 7 years later to become a geisha. Ibu debuted as a member of the Ichikoma okiya on 5 October 2010, and was still working as a geisha as of early 2012. She was reported as retired in 2016.
- Juri – (Maria), a Peruvian geisha working in the resort town of Yugawara in the Kanagawa Prefecture.
- Kimicho – (Sydney Stephens), an American national who worked as a geisha in the Shinagawa district of Tokyo. Stephens debuted in August 2015, but left the profession in 2017 for personal reasons.
- Rinka – (Zhang Xue), a Chinese national from Shenyang, who became a geisha in Shimoda in the Shizuoka Prefecture in September 2011.
- Sayuki – (Fiona Graham), an Australian geisha trainee who debuted in the Asakusa district of Tokyo in 2007 as the first registered foreign geisha in Japan. In February 2011, she was expelled from the Asakusa Geisha Association, and established an unregistered geisha house in the historic Fukagawa district. Graham died in January 2023.

=== Famous Geisha ===
- Han Takehara: Japanese classical dancer and poet, she served as a teacher of classical dance for many years.
- Aiko Katayama (dancer): Japanese classical dancer and teacher.The fourth iemoto of the Kyomai Inoue school.
- Tsuyako Ito: Japanese classical dancer and teacher.
- Tada Koyurugi: Japanese dancer and record singer.
- Tsutaki Yokomatsu Asaji: Japanese classical dancer and shamisen player.
- Kogane: Awarded the title of "Living National Treasure" by Atami City.
- Junkyo Oishi: Japanese painter.
- Sumi Hanayagi: A Japanese classical dancer founded the "Akatsuki" dance company and initiated the "New Dance Movement".
- Hanko Kagurazaka: Japanese record singer.
- Michiyakko: Japanese actress and record singer.
- Kōme Akasaka: Japanese record singer and actress.
- Hatsuyo Oyama: Osamu Dazai's ex-wife. She served as the model for many of the female characters in his works.
- Kimio Nakanishi: She is also known as"勤王芸者".
- Hara Asa: Hara Kei's wife.

== Geisha in Japanese society ==
Geisha are regarded in wider Japanese society as some of the most successful businesswomen in Japan, with almost the entirety of the karyūkai being owned and run by women. New geisha are trained for the most part by their symbolic mothers and older sisters, and engagements are arranged through the mother of the house. Infrequently, men take contingent positions within the karyūkai such as hair stylists, dressers (known as otokoshi, as dressing a maiko requires considerable strength) and accountants. The heads (iemoto) of some dance and music schools that geisha train under may also be male, with some barrier to entry for women to achieve the legacy of being the head of an artistic school.

The geisha system was founded, actually, to promote the independence and economic self-sufficiency of women. And that was its stated purpose, and it actually accomplished that quite admirably in Japanese society, where there were very few routes for women to achieve that sort of independence.

— Mineko Iwasaki in interview, Boston Phoenix

Historically, the majority of women within Japan were wives whose familial duties kept them from working outside their homes. A geisha, however, could achieve independence by working to pay off her debts, making the profession one method for women to support themselves without becoming a wife. Moreover, a geisha chosen as the heir (atotori) of a geisha house would have stable employment for much of her life, running the okiya throughout her career until the next generation.

Over time, some Japanese feminists have seen geisha as exploited women, but some modern geisha see themselves as liberated feminists: "We find our own way, without doing family responsibilities. Isn't that what feminists are?"

=== Geisha and male guests ===
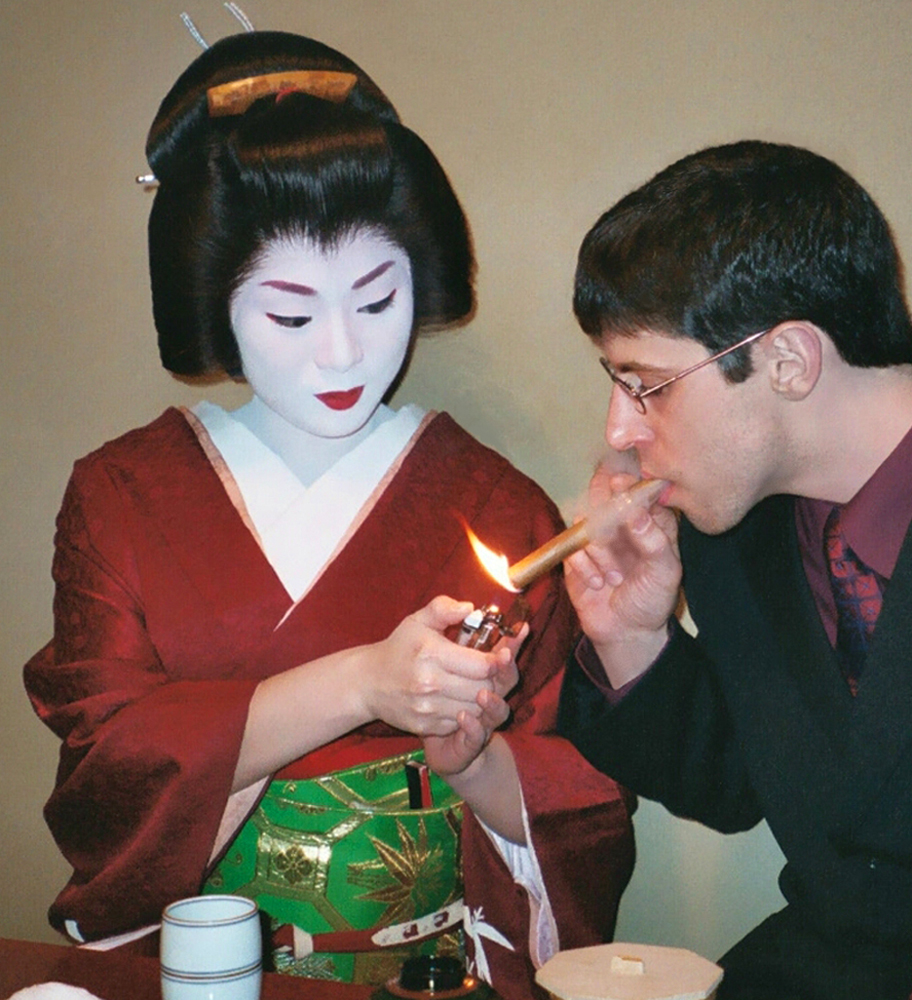
A geisha entertaining a foreign male guest

Historically, geisha held an appeal for mainly male guests as a woman outside of the role of "wife". Wives were modest, responsible, and at times sombre, whereas geisha could be playful and carefree. Geisha would, on occasion, marry their clients, but this required retirement.

Though relatively uncommon in previous decades, geisha parties are no longer understood to be affairs for male guests exclusively, with women commonly attending parties alongside other male guests. Though geisha will still gracefully flirt with and entertain male guests, this is understood to be a part of a geisha's hostessing and entertainment skills, and is not taken as a serious sign of personal interest.

=== Geisha and relationships ===
Despite long-held connotations between sex and geisha, a geisha's sex and love life is usually distinct from her professional life.

Geishas are not submissive and subservient, but in fact they are some of the most financially and emotionally successful and strongest women in Japan, and traditionally have been so.

— Mineko Iwasaki in interview, Boston Phoenix

Most geisha are single women, though they may have lovers or boyfriends over time, and are allowed to pursue these relationships outside of having a patron. In the present day, some geisha are married and continue to work in their capacity as geisha, despite it being uncommon; these geisha are likely to be based in regions outside of Kyoto, as its heavily traditionalist geisha districts would be unlikely to allow a married geisha to work.

=== Geisha and prostitution ===
Geisha have historically been conflated with prostitution and commonly confused with prostitutes, despite the profession being mostly forbidden from receiving payment for sex since its inception. Despite this, some geisha have historically engaged in prostitution, either through personal choice, or through coercion and at times force.

In 1872, shortly after the Meiji Restoration, the new government passed a law liberating "prostitutes (shōgi) and geisha (geigi)", ambiguously grouping both professions together. The terms of the law caused controversy from the unclear differentiation between professions, with some officials claiming that prostitutes and geisha worked different ends of the same profession, and that there would be little difference in calling all prostitutes "geisha". Nonetheless, the government maintained an official distinction between both professions, arguing that geisha should not be conflated with or confused for prostitutes.

Though the law officially maintained a distance between geisha and prostitutes, some geisha still engaged in prostitution. Writing in 1956, former geisha Sayo Masuda wrote of her experiences in the onsen town of Suwa, Nagano Prefecture, where she was sold for her virginity a number of times by the mother of her okiya. Such practices could be common in less reputable geisha districts, with onsen towns in particular being known for their so-called "double registered" geisha (a term for an entertainer registered as both a geisha and a prostitute). A geisha working to pay off her incumbent debts to the mother of the house often had little choice but to engage in prostitution, whether forced to by her occupational "mother", or coerced to do it in order to pay off her debts.

In 1956, and following its implementation in 1958, the Prostitution Prevention Law (Baishun-bōshi-hō) criminalised the vast majority of prostitution, essentially leading to the outlawing of practices such as mizuage for geisha. In the present day, mizuage does not exist, and apprentices mark their graduation to geisha status with a series of ceremonies and events.

Despite this, the modern conflation between geisha and prostitutes continues as a pervasive idea, particularly in Western culture. Sheridan Prasso wrote that Americans had "an incorrect impression of the real geisha world ... geisha means 'arts person' trained in music and dance, not in the art of sexual pleasure". Similarly, K.G. Henshall stated that the job of a geisha included "[entertaining] their customer, be it by dancing, reciting verse, playing musical instruments, or engaging in light conversation. Geisha engagements may include flirting with men and playful innuendos; however, clients know that nothing more can be expected. In a social style that is common in Japan, men are amused by the illusion of that which is never to be."

=== Danna partnership ===
In the past, it had been unspoken tradition for an established geisha to take a danna, or patron, who would pay for her expenses, buy her gifts, and engage her on a more personal level – at times involving sex – than a banquet or party would allow. This would be seen as a sign of the man's generosity, wealth, and status, as the expenses associated with being a geisha were relatively high; as such, a danna was typically a wealthy man, sometimes married, who may have been financially supporting the geisha in question through company expenses.

In the present day, it is less common for a geisha to take a danna, simply because of the expenses involved and the unlikelihood that a modern man could support both his household and a geisha's living expenses. Nonetheless, it was still common for geisha to retire from the profession in their mid-twenties to live off the support of their patron following the Second World War. The practice continues today, though geisha do not take danna anywhere as commonly, and though intimacy in a danna partnership was in previous decades not seen as essential, in modern times it is valued to a much greater degree because of the formal nature of the commitment and the awareness by both parties of how expensive it can be. The taking of a patron by a geisha is the closest thing to paid compensation for a personal partnership – whatever that partnership might entail – that a geisha officially engages in today.

=== "Geisha (Gee-sha) girls" ===
During the Allied occupation of Japan, some prostitutes, almost exclusively working for the occupying forces in Japan, began to advertise themselves as "geisha girls", partly because many foreign soldiers could not tell the difference between a geisha and a woman dressed in a kimono. These women came to be known commonly as "geesha girls", a misnomer originating from the language barrier between the armed forces and the prostitutes themselves; the term spread quickly, as evidenced by the fact that shortly after their arrival in 1945, it was said that some occupying American GIs congregated in Ginza and shouted "We want geesha girls!".

The English term "geisha girl" soon became a byword for any female Japanese prostitute, whether actually selling sex or not; the term was applied to bar hostesses (who occupy the role of entertaining men through conversation, not necessarily sex) and streetwalkers alike. The term "geisha girls", its quick spread to Western culture, and the accompanying mental image of a woman in a kimono offering sex and entertainment, is largely speculated as responsible for the continuing misconception in the West that geisha are widely engaged in prostitution.

=== Mizuage ===
Mizuage (水揚げ, "raising the waters") was a ceremony undergone by junior kamuro (apprentice courtesans) and some maiko as part of the process of promotion to senior status. Originally meaning "the unloading of a ship's cargo of fish," over time, the term became an innuendo for money earned in the karyūkai, another name for the entertainment business being the mizu shōbai – literally, "the water business". Fishermen use the word mizuage to talk about how much fish they caught a day, and the word mizuage is also used by geisha to talk about their monthly earnings.

Alongside changes in appearance – such as from the junior wareshinobu hairstyle to the more senior ofuku style, – and visits paid to businesses and places of importance around the karyūkai, an apprentice would occasionally have their virginity sold to a patron, who ostensibly supported their graduation to geisha status – usually through the exorbitant fee charged for the privilege. Unscrupulous okiya owners would not uncommonly sell an apprentice's virginity more than once to different customers, pocketing the entire fee for themselves with the apprentice herself remaining an apprentice. During World War II, some prostitutes would use this term to refer to their acts with customers, leading to some confusion – particularly when referring to themselves as "geisha" when in the company of foreign soldiers, and sometimes amongst Japanese customers.

Mizuage as a rite of passage, a coming-of-age ceremony in which a patron paid a great sum of money to take a girl's virginity, did exist, but it was more of a courtesan's and prostitute's tradition than a maiko's and geisha's. Not all geisha groups practiced the ritual of selling virginity; it was indeed discouraged by many. For example, in pre-war Kamaishi City, geisha were strictly trained and supervised, there was no tradition of "Mizuage". "Mizuage" originated from the tradition of Kamaishi prostitutes in brothels next to the geisha district. Historically, there were indeed geisha groups that sold the virginity of maiko in the form of prostitution, and geisha registered as "double geisha" might even engage in prostitution multiple times to sell their virginity. Therefore, it is often mistakenly believed that all geisha in the past engaged in prostitution. Since the criminalization of prostitution in Japan in 1956, mizuage is no longer practiced within the karyukai.

Traditionally, mizuage for maiko was a change in hairstyle that symbolized the girl's next step to becoming a geisha. During this ceremony, the top-knot of the respective Maiko's wareshinobu hairstyle is ritually cut open and small presents are handed out to ochaya she frequents, close clients, or her okiya may have close relationships with. Afterwards, the geisha wears the ofuku hairstyle as her everyday-hairstyle.

== Geisha districts ==
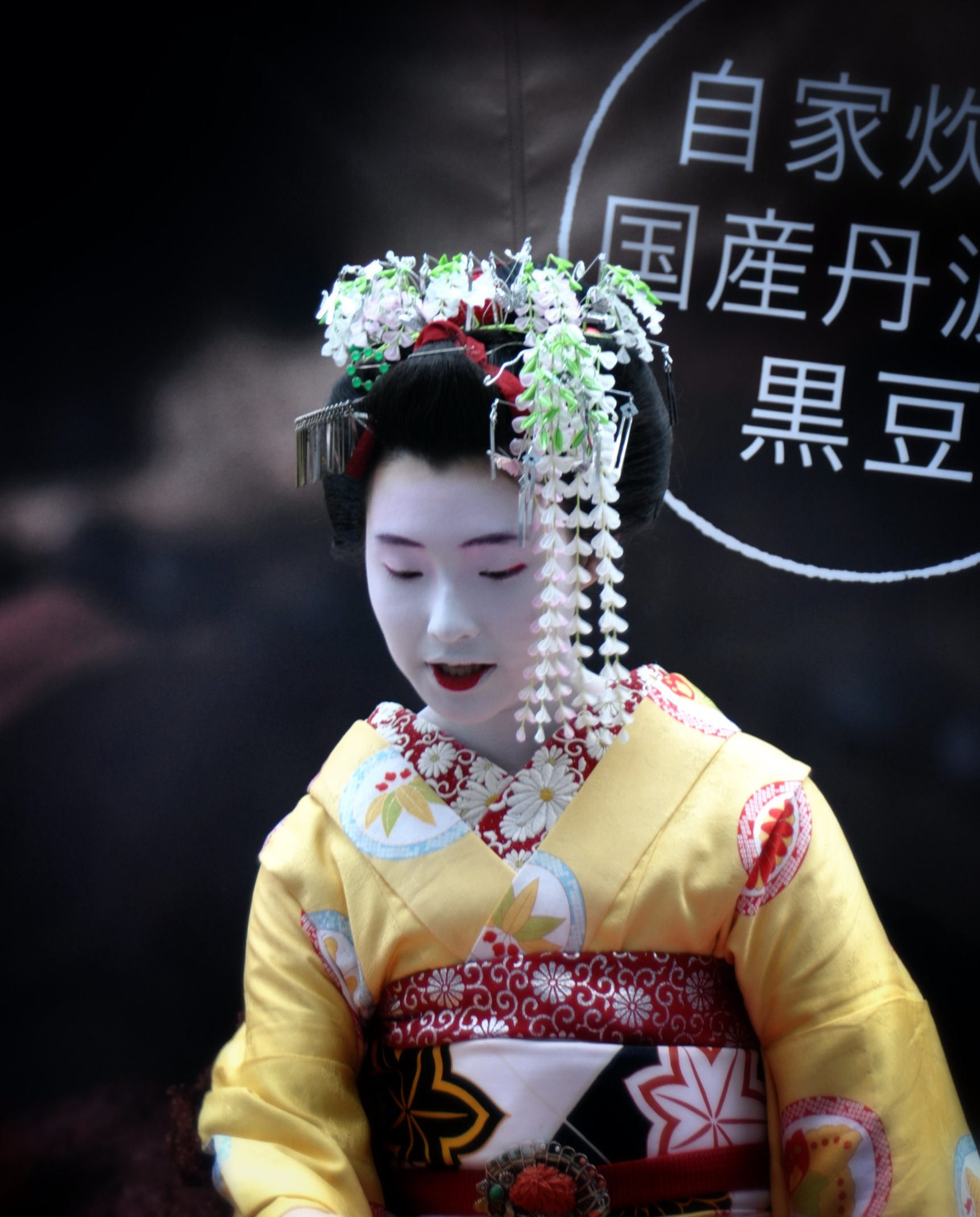
Maiko Mameroku of Gion Kobu

Geisha work in districts known as hanamachi (lit. 'flower towns'), and are said to inhabit the karyūkai ("flower and willow world"), a term originating from a time when both courtesans and geisha worked within the same areas. Courtesans were said to be the "flowers" in this moniker for their showy and beautiful nature, with geisha being the "willows" for their understated nature.

Part of the comparison between geisha and willows comes from the perceived loyalty amongst geisha to their patrons – over time, it became known that certain factions, such as certain political parties, would patronise some geisha districts with their rivals patronising others. Though courtesans (and by extension, prostitutes) were humorously known for having loyalty only to the customer paying them for the night, a geisha would stand by her patrons and defend their best interests, her loyalty to her patrons being perceived as higher than her loyalty to her money.

Historically, geisha on occasion were confined to operate in the same walled districts as courtesans and prostitutes; however, both professions have on some level always maintained a distance officially, despite often being legislated against by the same laws.

=== Tokyo ===
The six hanamachi in Tokyo are Asakusa (浅草), Akasaka (赤坂), Kagurazaka (神楽坂), Shimbashi (新橋), Mukōjima (向島), and Yoshichō (芳町). The Fukagawa district of Tokyo is known for being the location of the first female geisha in Japan; however, the area faced decline following WWII, with its registry office closing temporarily in the 1980s, before being partially revived in the mid- to late-2000s.

Within the Tokyo prefecture but outside of the city's 23 wards, the city of Hachiōji has its own geisha culture heritage.

=== Kyoto ===
The hanamachi in Kyoto are known for their adherence to tradition and high prestige, with the image of a Kyoto maiko typifying that of geisha culture within wider Japanese and international society.

In Kyoto, the different hanamachi – known as the gokagai (lit. 'five' hanamachi) – are seen as unofficially ranked. Gion Kobu (祇園甲部), Ponto-chō (先斗町) and Kamishichiken (上七軒) are seen as the most prestigious, with Gion Kobu at the top; below these three are Gion Higashi (祇園東) and Miyagawa-chō (宮川町). The more prestigious hanamachi are frequented by powerful businessmen and politicians.

In the 1970s, the geisha districts in Kyoto were known as the rōkkagai (lit. 'six' hanamachi), as the district of Shimabara (島原) was still officially active as a geisha district, as well as hosting tayū reenactors; however, no geisha are active in Shimabara in the 21st century, despite modern tayū continuing to work there.

=== Niigata ===
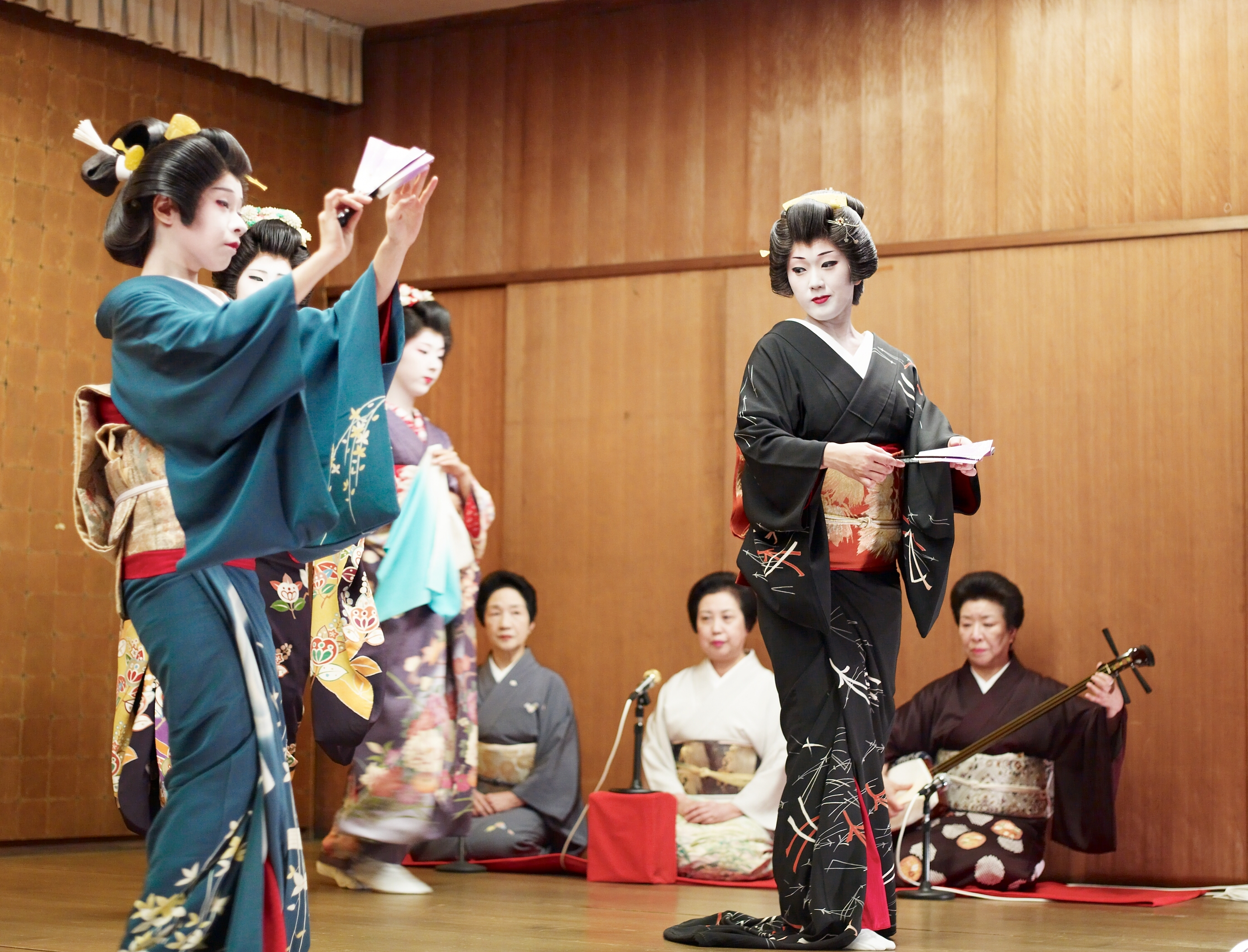
Niigata geigi dancing

The northern city of Niigata has its own geisha tradition, which dates to the Edo period. The geisha in Niigata are known as geigi. The Furumachi neighbourhood is the place where most ochaya are located, with places such as the Nabechaya.

The Niigata geigi are known for holding more flexible rules and traditions than other geisha districts in Japan, leading to the district's revival in the modern day, following a period of decline in the 1980s.

=== Regional hanamachi ===
Though other regional hanamachi are typically not large enough to have a hierarchy, regional geisha districts are seen as having less prestige than those in Kyoto, viewed as being the pinnacle of tradition in the karyukai.

Geisha in onsen towns such as Atami may also be seen as less prestigious, as geisha working in these towns are typically hired to work in one hotel for travelling customers they are usually not familiar with before entertaining; nevertheless, all geisha, regardless of region or district, are trained in the traditional arts, making the distinction of prestige one of history and tradition.

== In popular culture ==
Geisha have been the subject of numerous films, books, and television shows.

=== Films ===
- Sisters of the Gion (1936)—Dir. Kenji Mizoguchi
- A Geisha (Gion bayashi (祇園囃子)) (1953)—Dir. Kenji Mizoguchi
- The Teahouse of the August Moon (1956)—Dir. Daniel Mann
- The Barbarian and the Geisha (1958)—Dir. John Huston
- The Geisha Boy (1958)—Dir. Frank Tashlin
- Late Chrysanthemums (Bangiku) (1958)—Dir. Mikio Naruse
- Cry for Happy (1961)—George Marshall comedy
- My Geisha (1962)—Dir. Jack Cardiff
- The Wolves (1971)—Dir. Hideo Gosha
- BU • SU (1987)—Dir. Jun Ichikawa
- A-Ge-Man: Tales of a Golden Geisha (1990)—Dir. Juzo Itami
- The Geisha House (1999)—Dir. Kinji Fukasaku
- Zatoichi (2003)—Dir. Takeshi Kitano
- Fighter in the Wind (2004)—Dir. Yang Yun-ho
- Memoirs of a Geisha (2005)—Dir. Rob Marshall
- Wakeful Nights (2005)—Dir. Masahiko Tsugawa
- Maiko Haaaan!!! (2007)—Dir. Nobuo Mizuta
- Lady Maiko (2014)—Dir. Masayuki Suo
- Dark Feathers: Dance of the Geisha (2024) — Dir. Crystal J. Huang & Nicholas Ryan

=== Novels ===
- The Dancing Girl of Izu (1926) by Yasunari Kawabata
- Snow Country (1948) by Yasunari Kawabata

=== Manga ===
- Kiyo in Kyoto (2016–2025)

=== Television ===
- Meoto Zenzai (2013)
- The Makanai: Cooking for the Maiko House (2023)

== See also ==
- Shirabyōshi (Japan)
- Taikomochi (Japan)
- Goze (Japan)
- Ca trù (Vietnam)
- Gaṇikā (India)
- Nagarvadhu (India)
- Tawaif (India)
- Kisaeng (Korea)
- Qiyan (Arab)
- Hetaera (Ancient Greece)
- Geji (China)
- Hanayo (Japanese artist and former geisha)
- Izumo no Okuni (Kabuki actress)
