= Prostitution in Japan =

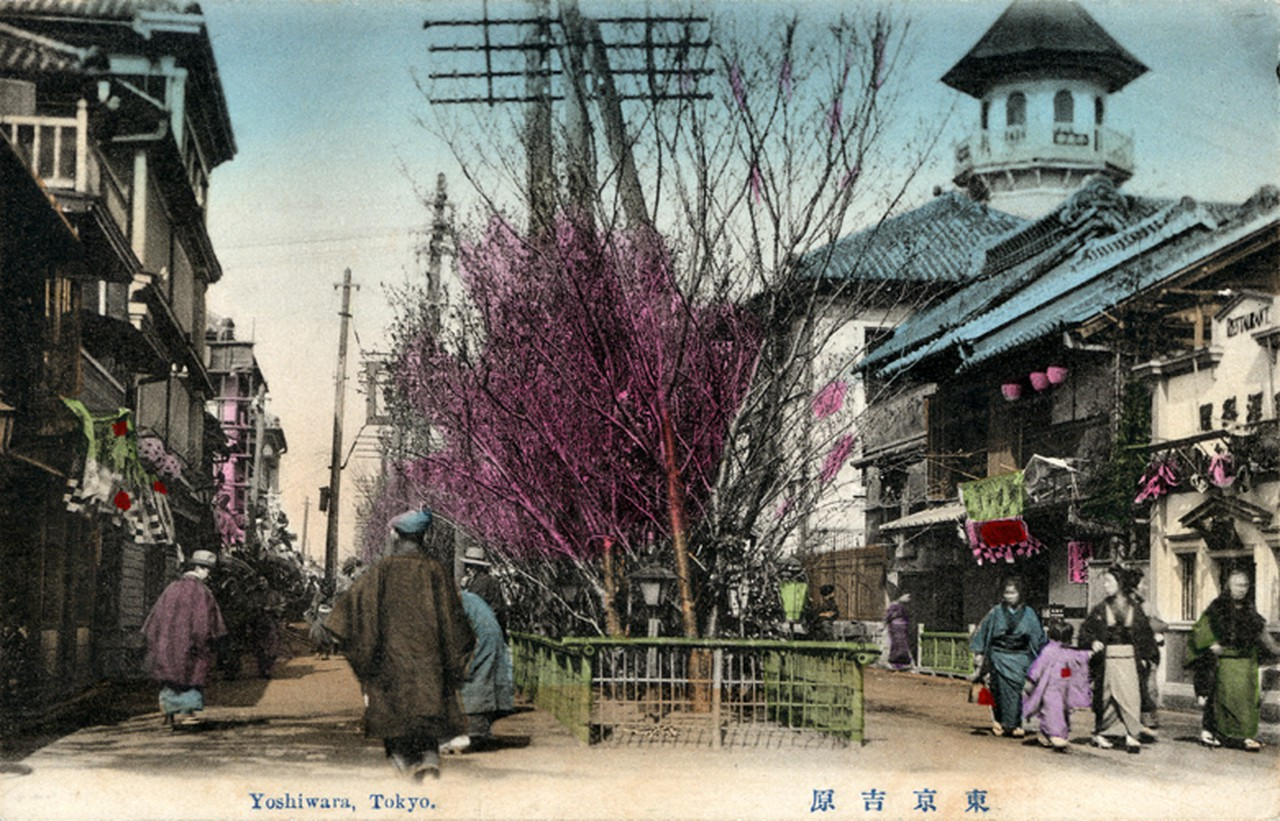
Tokyo's Yoshiwara pleasure quarter, antique postcard

Prostitution in Japan has existed throughout the country's history. While the Prostitution Prevention Law of 1956 states that "No person may either do prostitution or become the customer of it", loopholes, liberal interpretations, and lax enforcement have allowed the Japanese sex industry to persist and flourish.

According to various estimates, there are roughly 300,000 active sex workers in Japan. The sex industry generates an estimated 2.3 trillion yen ($24 billion) annually, which could amount to roughly 1% of Japan's GDP according to some studies.

Sex trade and sex services may be referred to as fūzoku (風俗), which also means "manners", "customs", or "public morals".

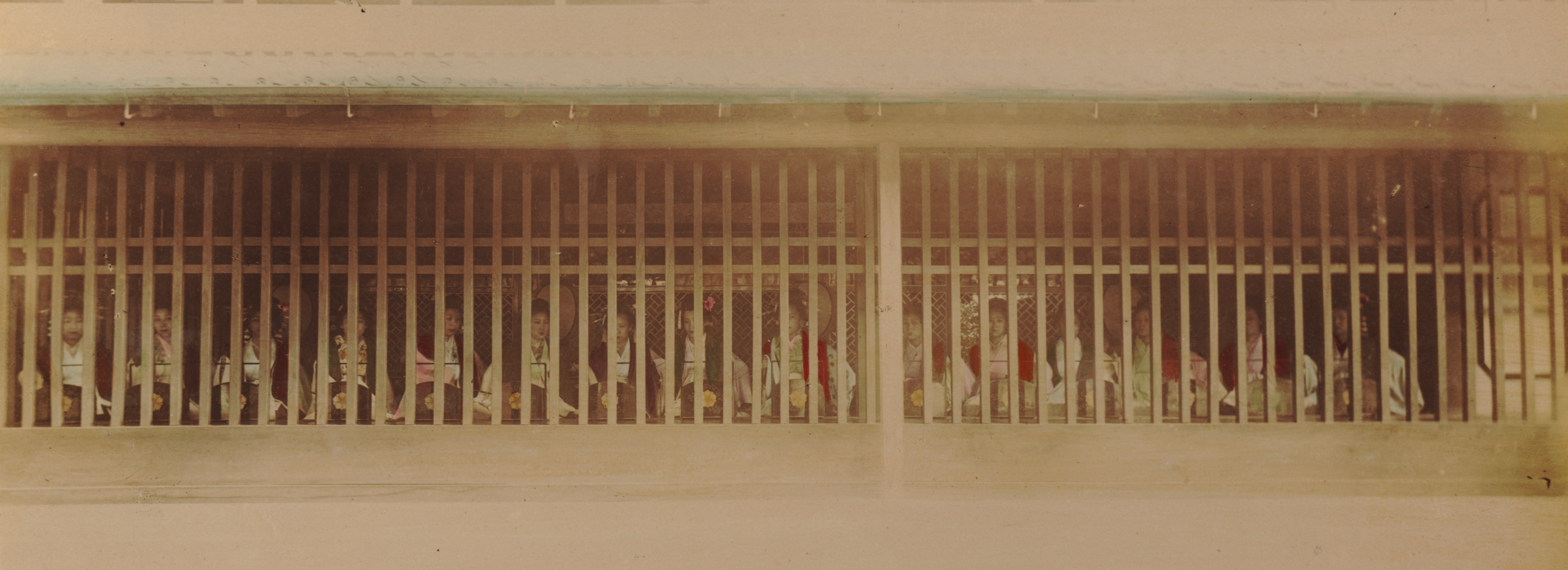
Prostitutes sitting behind harimise (張り見世) in Shizuoka in Japan, c. 1890, taken by Kusakabe Kimbei

Since Japanese law defines prostitution strictly as "intercourse with an unspecified person in exchange for payment", most fūzoku services offer non-coital services such as conversation, dancing, or bathing, sometimes accompanied by sexual acts that legally are not defined as "intercourse", in order to remain within the law.

Sex workers in Japan face structural challenges, including limited labor protections, lack of social security coverage, and social stigma. Estimates suggest the number of sex workers could be higher if part-time or clandestine operators are included.

== History ==
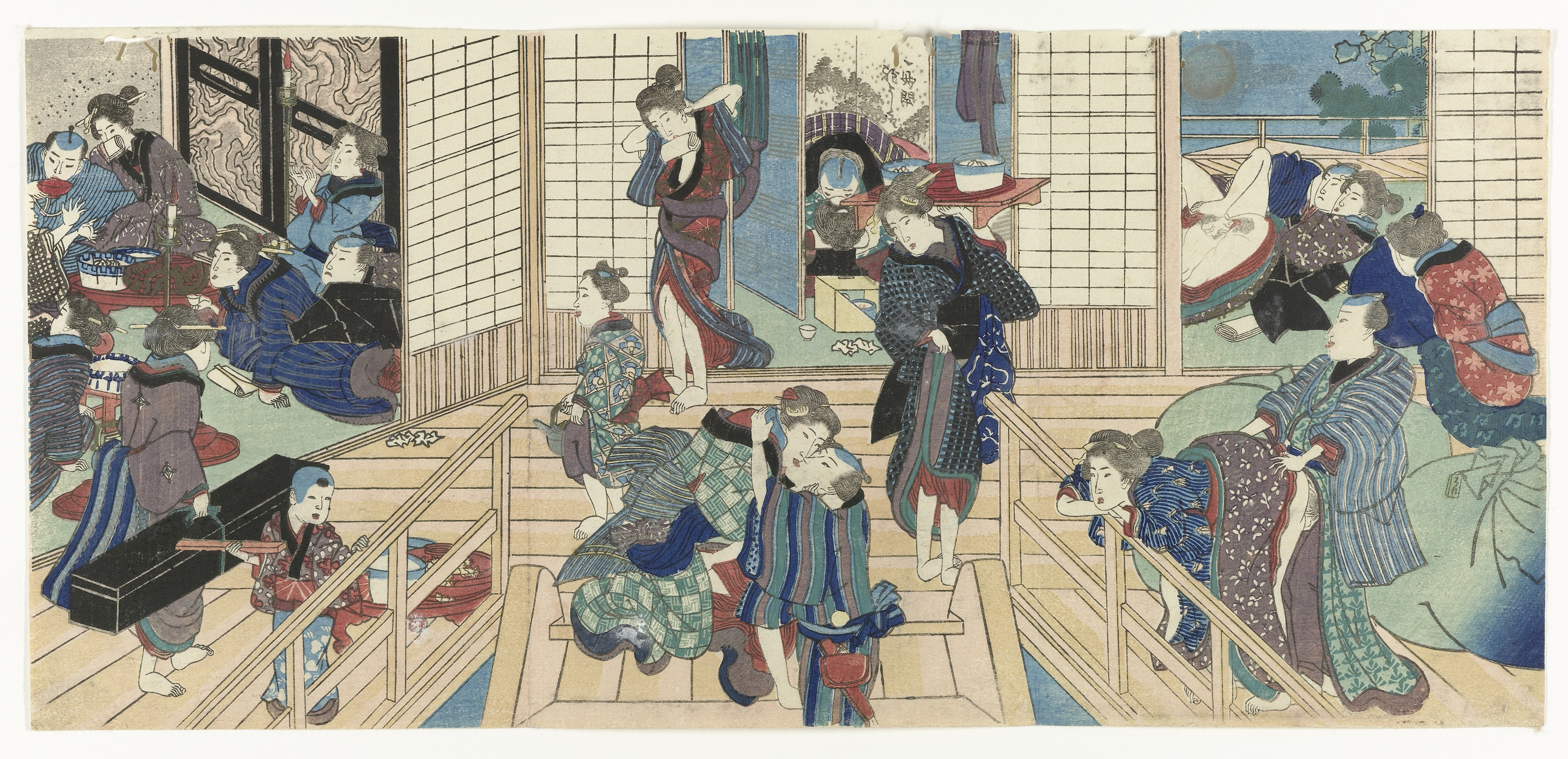
Scenes in a brothel, by Utagawa Kunisada, 1840

From the 15th century, Chinese, Koreans, and other East Asian visitors frequented brothels in Japan.

This practice later continued among visitors from "the Western regions", mainly European traders who often came with their South Asian lascar crew (in addition to African crew members in some cases). This began with the arrival of Portuguese ships to Japan in the 1540s, when the local Japanese people assumed that the Portuguese were from Tenjiku (天竺, "Heavenly Abode"), the ancient Chinese name (and later Japanese name) for the Indian subcontinent, and thus assumed that Christianity was a new Indian religion. These mistaken assumptions were due to the Indian state of Goa being a central base for the Portuguese East India Company at the time, and due to a significant portion of the crew on Portuguese ships being Indian Christians.

Hundreds of Japanese people, especially women, were sold as slaves. Portuguese visitors and their South Asian and African crew members (or slaves) often engaged in slavery in Japan. They bought or captured young Japanese women and girls, who were either used as sexual slaves on their ships or taken to Macau and other Portuguese colonies in Southeast Asia, the Americas, and India, where there was a community of Japanese slaves and traders in Goa by the early 17th century. Anti-Portuguese propaganda and exaggerations were actively promoted by the Japanese, particularly with regard to the Portuguese purchases of Japanese women for sexual purposes.

In 1505, syphilis started to appear in Japan, likely because of Japanese prostitutes having sex with Chinese sailors. In Sakai and Hakata ports, Japanese brothels had already been patronized by Chinese visitors far before Europeans came to Japan. When the Europeans (Nanbanjin) came to Japan, they too patronized Japanese prostitutes. Traders of the various European East India Companies, including those of the Dutch and British, engaged the services of prostitutes while visiting or staying in Japan.

=== Edo era ===
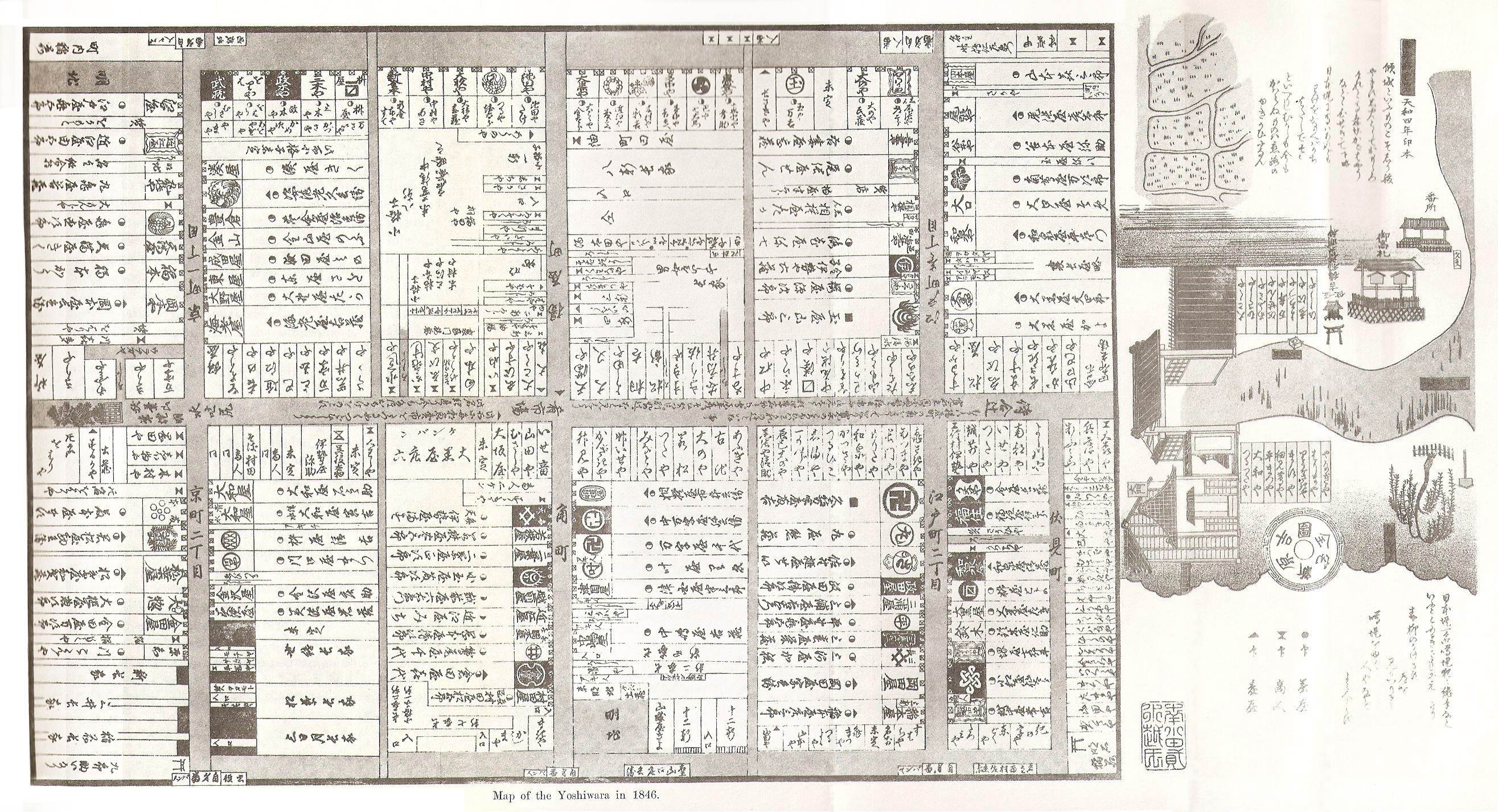
Map of Yoshiwara from 1846

In 1617, the Tokugawa Shogunate issued an order restricting prostitution to certain areas on the outskirts of cities, known as yūkaku (遊廓、遊郭, lit. 'pleasure quarter'). The most famous of these were Yoshiwara in Edo (present-day Tokyo), Shinmachi in Osaka, and Shimabara in Kyoto.

Pleasure quarters were walled and guarded for taxation and access control. Prostitutes and courtesans were licensed as yūjo (遊女, "women of pleasure") and ranked according to an elaborate hierarchy, with tayū (太夫) and later oiran (花魁) at the apex. The women were not allowed outside of the walls except to visit dying relatives and, once a year, for hanami (viewing cherry blossoms).

=== Prewar modern era ===
The opening of Japan and the subsequent flood of Western influences into Japan brought about a series of changes in the Meiji period. Japanese novelists, notably Higuchi Ichiyō, started to draw attention to the confinement and squalid existence of the lower-class prostitutes in the red-light districts. In 1872, the María Luz Incident led Government of Meiji Japan to enact new legislation, emancipating burakumin outcasts, prostitutes and other forms of bonded labor in Japan. The emancipating law for prostitution was named Geishōgi kaihō rei (芸娼妓解放令). In 1900, the Japanese Government promulgated Ordinance No. 44, Shōgi torishimari kisoku (娼妓取締規則), restricting the labor conditions of prostitution. The restriction neither reduced the total number of prostitution nor granted more liberty to women. Instead, prostitution thrived under the Meiji government. The name "kingdom of whoring" (売春王国, baishun ōkoku) was to describe Japan during the Meiji Period. Due to the development of the modern transportation system, the demand and the supply of prostitution increased, and the female population drastically increased. The government, therefore, with the legislation, could legally collect taxation from prostitution. Rather than improving human rights or liberty, the legislation intended to facilitate government revenue. The prostitution industry contributed a large part of government revenue from the late Tokugawa period to the Meiji period.

In 1908, the Ministry of Home Affairs' Ordinance No. 16 penalized unregulated prostitution.

==== Karayuki-san ====
Karayuki-san was the name given to Japanese girls and women in the late 19th and early 20th centuries who were trafficked from poverty stricken agricultural prefectures in Japan to destinations in East Asia, Southeast Asia, Siberia (Russian Far East), Manchuria, and India to serve as prostitutes and sexually serviced men from a variety of races, including Chinese, Europeans, native Southeast Asians, and others.

=== Postwar era ===
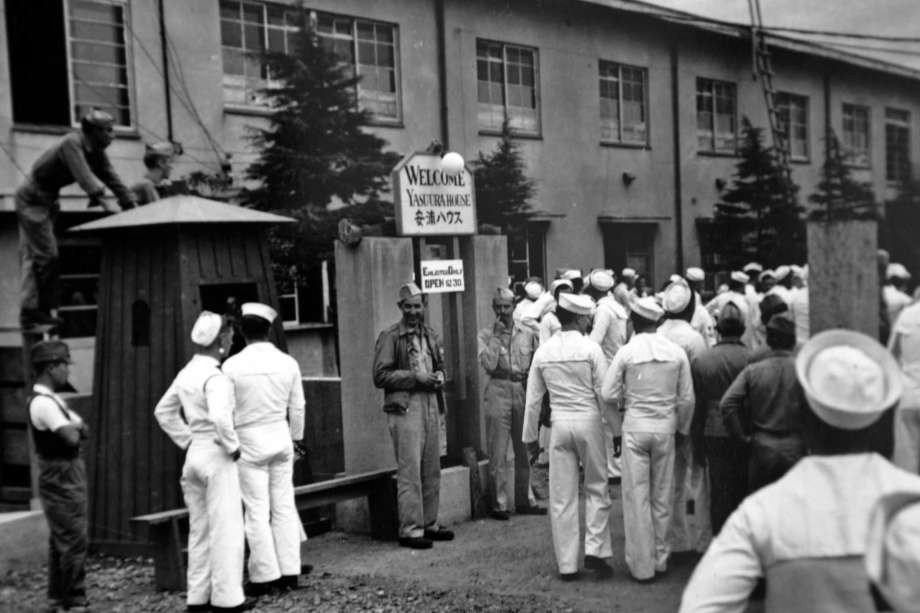
G.I.s in Recreation and Amusement Association during the occupation of Japan

Immediately after World War II, the Recreation and Amusement Association was formed by Naruhiko Higashikuni's government to organize brothels to serve the Allied armed forces occupying Japan. On 19 August 1945, the Home Ministry ordered local government offices to establish a prostitution service for Allied soldiers to preserve the "purity" of the Japanese race. This prostitution system was similar to the comfort system, because the Japanese police force was responsible for mobilizing the women to serve in these stations similarly to the way that Japanese Military during the Pacific War mobilized women. The police forces mobilized both licensed and unlicensed prostitutes to serve in these camps. The official declaration stated that "Through the sacrifice of thousands of 'Okichis' of the Shōwa era, we shall construct a dike to hold back the mad frenzy of the occupation troops and cultivate and preserve the purity of our race long into the future." Such clubs were soon established by cabinet councilor Yoshio Kodama and Ryoichi Sasakawa.

SCAP abolished the licensed prostitution system (including the RAA) in 1946, which led to the so-called red line (赤線, akasen) system, under which licensed nightlife establishments offered sexual services under the guise of being an ordinary club or cafe. Local police authorities traditionally regulated the location of such establishments by drawing red lines on a map. In other areas, so-called "blue line" establishments offered sexual services under the guise of being restaurants, bars or other less strictly-regulated establishments. In Tokyo, the best-known "red line" districts were Yoshiwara and Shinjuku 2-chome, while the best-known "blue line" district was Kabuki-cho.

In 1947, Imperial Ordinance No. 9 punished persons for enticing women to act as prostitutes, but prostitution itself remained legal. Several bills were introduced in the Diet to add further legal penalties for soliciting prostitutes but were not passed due to disputes over the appropriate extent of punishment.

Following the end of World War II, Ueno Park became a prominent site of various sorts of sex work, offered by cisgender panpan girls and assigned male at birth danshō (男娼) in women's clothes. Police Chief Eiichi Tanaka was at a forefront of fight on prostitution, and led an intervention of a large group of policemen and politicians on Ueno Park on November 22, 1948. The intervention turned into a riot, with some of the danshō (including their leader Okiyo) beating and hitting Tanaka and the police. The public reaction was sympathetic to the sex workers resisting the widely maligned police.

On 24 May 1956, the Diet of Japan passed the Anti-Prostitution Law, which came into force in April 1958. The Anti-Prostitution Law criminalized the act of committing sexual intercourse in exchange for actual or promised compensation. This eliminated the "red line" and "blue line" systems and allowed a number of paid sexual services to continue under "sexual entertainment" regulations, such as "soaplands" and "fashion health" parlors.

In 2013, Toru Hashimoto, who co-leads the Japan Restoration Party proposed "There are places where people can legally release their sexual energy in Japan", and "Unless they make use of these facilities, it will be difficult to control the sexual energies of the wild Marines." The U.S. Department of State later criticized Hashimoto's remarks.

== Religious connotations ==
=== Shinto ===
The Shinto faith does not regard sex as a taboo. During the Kamakura period, many shrines and temples, which provided for miko, fell into bankruptcy. Some miko started travelling in search of livelihood and came to be known as aruki miko (lit. 'walking miko'). While aruki miko primarily provided religious services, they were also widely associated with prostitution. However, no religious reasons for miko prostitution are known, and hence the act might be unrelated to sacred prostitution.

=== Buddhism ===
Buddhist teachings regarding sex are quite reserved: "It is true to say that Buddhism, in keeping with the principle of the Middle Way, would advocate neither extreme puritanism nor extreme permissiveness." Buddhism has rules and protocols for those that are to live the Buddhist principles in the monasteries and the secular part of the [Sangha]. For the Buddhist monks or nuns, chastity is mandatory since they live on the premise of getting rid of any feelings of attachment. Their way of living is regulated by very strict rules concerning behavior and this includes sex.

As for the secular Buddhists, there are no specific rules to be followed about sex; although any kind of abuse is regarded as "misconduct".

== Current status ==
=== Legal status ===
Article 3 of the Prostitution Prevention Law (売春防止法, Baishun Bōshi Hō) of 1956 states that "No person may either do prostitution or become the customer of it", but no judicial penalty is defined for this act. Instead, the following are prohibited on pain of penalty: soliciting for purposes of prostitution, procuring a person for prostitution, coercing a person into prostitution, receiving compensation from the prostitution of others, inducing a person to be a prostitute by paying an "advance", concluding a contract for making a person a prostitute, furnishing a place for prostitution, engaging in the business of making a person a prostitute, and the furnishing of funds for prostitution.

The definition of prostitution is strictly limited to coitus with an "unspecified person". This means sale of numerous acts such as oral sex, anal sex, mammary intercourse and other non-coital sex acts are legal. Paid sex between "specified persons" (acquaintances) is not prohibited. Soaplands exploit this by providing a massage, during which the prostitute and client become "acquainted", as a preliminary to sexual services.

The Businesses Affecting Public Morals Regulation Law of 1948 (風俗営業取締法, Fūzoku Eigyō Torishimari Hō), also known as the "Law to Regulate Adult Entertainment Businesses", amended in 1985, 1999 and 2005, regulates these businesses.

=== Types ===
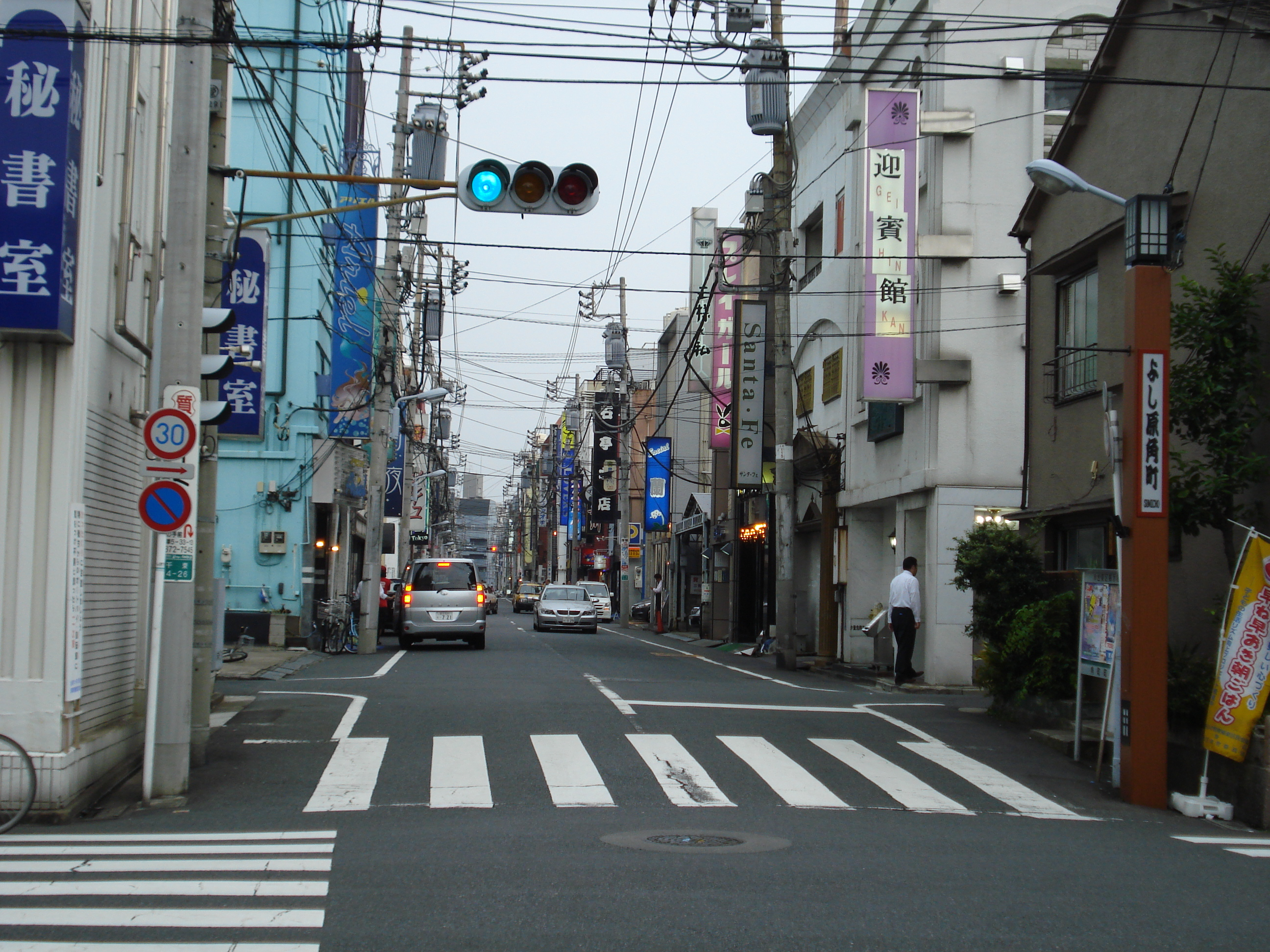
Soaplands town Yoshiwara (2008)

The sex industry in Japan uses a variety of names. Soaplands are bath houses where customers are soaped up and serviced by staff. Fashion health shops and pink salons are notionally massage or esthetic treatment parlors; image clubs are themed versions of the same. Call girls operate via delivery health services. Freelancers can get in contact with potential customers via deai sites (Internet dating sites).

Tokyo is the business and trade center of Japan, and therefore also a thriving market for sex work of all varieties. Kabukicho, an entertainment and red-light district in Shinjuku, Tokyo, measures only 0.34 km^{2} (34 hectares) and has approximately 3,500 sex parlors, strip theaters, peep shows, "soaplands", lovers' banks, porno shops, sex telephone clubs, karaoke bars and clubs, etc.

It was reported in 2003 that as many as 150,000 non-Japanese women were then involved in prostitution in Japan. According to National Police Agency records, out of 50 non-Japanese people arrested for prostitution offences in 2013, 31 (62%) were mainland Chinese, 13 (26%) were Koreans and 4 (8%) were Thai.

According to National Police Agency records, out of 224 non-Japanese people arrested for prostitution offences in 2018, 160 (71%) were mainland Chinese, 19 (8%) were Thai.

Many businesses related to prostitution voluntarily (i.e., despite there being no regulation requiring it) ban entry to foreigners, including tourists, people who cannot speak Japanese, and even people who do not have Asian traits. However, in recent years, several businesses have been set up to specifically cater to the foreigner market.

== Terms ==
Baishun (売春, "selling spring" or "selling youth")
The act of selling sex. Originally a euphemism, it has become a legal term used in, for instance, the title of the 1956 Anti-Prostitution Law (売春防止法, Baishun-bōshi-hō); the modern meaning of the word is quite specific and it is usually only used for actual (i.e., illegal) prostitution. The word for "prostitute" in Japanese is baishunfu (売春婦).
Kaishun (買春)
The act of buying sex. The title of the law (Jidō-kaishun-shobatsu-hō (児童買春処罰法)) was used in 1999. The reading kaishun is yutō-yomi, and it is used because the alternative reading baishun would be easily confused with baishun.
Baibaishun (売買春/買売春)
A combination of baishun and kai/baishun; meaning "prostitution".
Mizu shōbai (水商売)
Literally the "water trade"; a wider term covering the entire entertainment industry. An older term originating in the pleasure quarters of the previous centuries, the mizu-shōbai referred to not only yūjo, but also their higher-class cousins the oiran, tayū, kabuki actors, and geisha; while the former three were legitimate in selling sex, the latter two did not do so officially, though some either chose to sell sex for money, or, in the case of the famous geisha Teruha, may have been coerced or even forced into it.
Fūzoku (風俗)
"Manners", also "customs" or "public morals"; commonly used to refer specifically to the sex industry, although in legal use this covers, e.g., dance halls and gambling, and the more specific term seifūzoku (性風俗), is used instead. The term originates from a law regulating business affecting public morals.

== Sex trafficking ==
The following largely reflects the view of the United States Department of State on the subject:

Japan is a destination, source, and transit country for men, women and children subjected to sex trafficking. Men, women, and children from Northeast Asia, Southeast Asia, South Asia, Russia, East Europe, South America, and Africa travel to Japan for employment or fraudulent marriage and are subjected to sex trafficking. Traffickers use fraudulent marriages between foreign women and Japanese men to facilitate the entry of women into Japan for forced prostitution in bars, clubs, brothels, and massage parlors. Traffickers keep victims in forced prostitution using debt bondage, threats of violence or deportation, blackmail, passport retention, and other psychologically coercive methods. Brothel operators sometimes arbitrarily impose "fines" on victims for alleged misbehavior as a tactic to extend their indebtedness. Trafficking victims reportedly transit Japan before being exploited in onward destinations, including East Asia and North America.

Japanese citizens, particularly runaway teenage girls, are also subjected to sex trafficking. Enjo kōsai, or "compensated dating", and variants of the JK business continue to facilitate the sex trafficking of Japanese children. Children in the Japanese commercial sex industry identified by law enforcement have been inadequately screened for trafficking indicators. Highly organized prostitution networks target vulnerable Japanese women and girls—often living in poverty or with cognitive disabilities—in public spaces such as subways, popular youth hangouts, schools, and online, and subject them to sex trafficking. Private Japanese immigration brokers help Japanese-Filipino children and their Filipina mothers move to Japan and acquire citizenship for a significant fee, which the mothers often incur large debts to pay; upon arrival, some of these women and their children are subjected to sex trafficking to pay off the debts.

As of 2020, the United States Department of State Office to Monitor and Combat Trafficking in Persons ranks Japan as a 'Tier 2' country.

== See also ==
- Akasen
- Alibi-ya
- Gate of Flesh
- Geisha and prostitution
- Panpan girls
- Prostitution in Cambodia
- Prostitution in India
- Prostitution in Indonesia
- Prostitution in Thailand
- Prostitution in the Philippines
