= Mizu shōbai =

Japanese euphemism for the entertainment industry

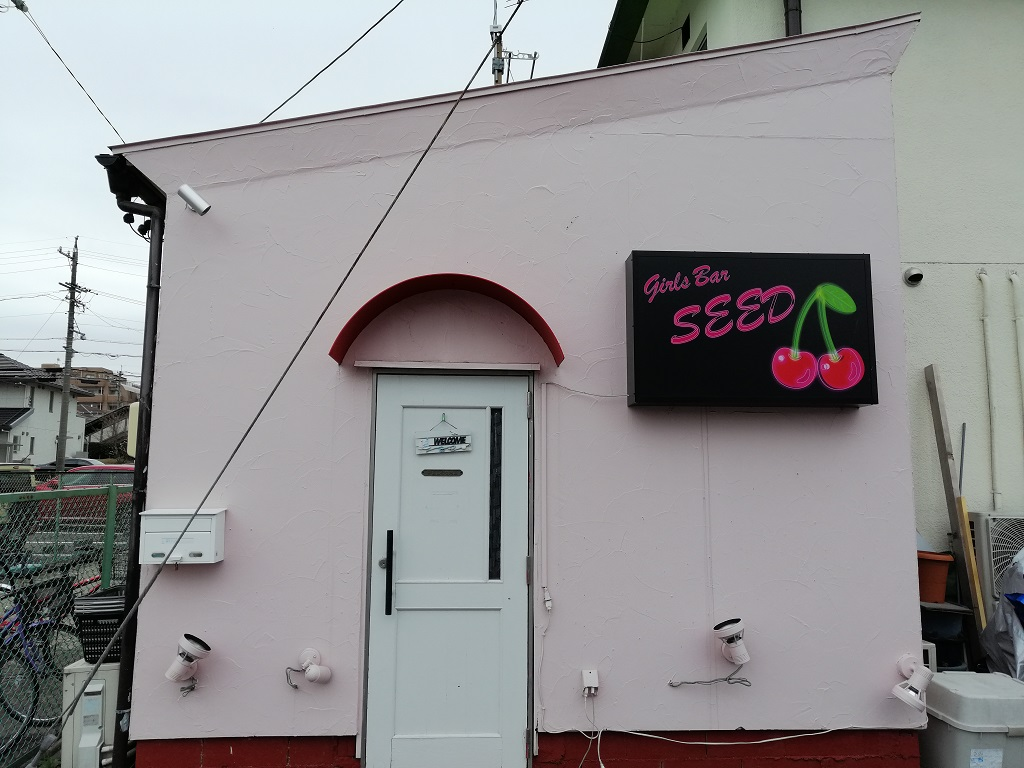
Girls Bar SEED

In Japanese culture, mizu-shōbai (Japanese: 水商売), literally the water trade, is work that does not provide a contractually fixed salary, but instead relies on the popularity of the performer among their fans or clientele. Broadly, it includes the television, theater, and movie industries, but more narrowly, it can refer to those who work in businesses that serve alcohol or provide sex. Bars, cabarets, health, hostess bars, image clubs, pink salons and soaplands are all part of the mizu shōbai; though they are not sex workers, geisha and kabuki actors are traditionally considered part of the mizu shōbai as well.

== Etymology ==
While the actual origin of the term mizu-shōbai is debatable, it is likely the term came into use during the Tokugawa shogunate (1603–1868). The Tokugawa period saw the development of large bathhouses and an expansive network of roadside inns offering "hot baths and sexual release", as well as the expansion of geisha districts and courtesan quarters in cities and towns throughout the country.

According to one theory proposed by the Nihon Gogen Daijiten, the term comes from the Japanese expression shōbu wa mizumono da (勝負は水物だ, "gain or loss is a matter of chance"), where the literal meaning of the phrase "matter of chance", mizumono (水物), is "a matter of water". In the entertainment business, income depends on a large number of fickle factors like popularity among customers, the weather, and the state of the economy; success and failure change as rapidly as the flow of water. The Nihon Zokugo Daijiten, on the other hand, notes that the term may derive from the expression doromizu-kagyō (泥水稼業, lit. 'muddy water earning business'), for earning a living in the red-light districts, or from the Edo-period expression mizuchaya (水茶屋) for a public teahouse.

== See also ==
- Businesses Affecting Public Morals Regulation Act
- Host and hostess clubs
- Kyabakura Union
- Prostitution in Japan
- Sexuality in Japan
