= Recreation and Amusement Association =

1945–1946 prostitution organization in Japan

- Native name: 特殊慰安施設協会 (Japanese)
- Founded: August 23, 1945
- Defunct: March 25, 1946
- Fate: Facilities placed off limits on March 25, 1946 and closed shortly thereafter.
- Headquarters: Tokyo, Japan
- Area served: Japan
- Services: Prostitution
- Number of employees: 55,000 total, 2,000 prostitutes

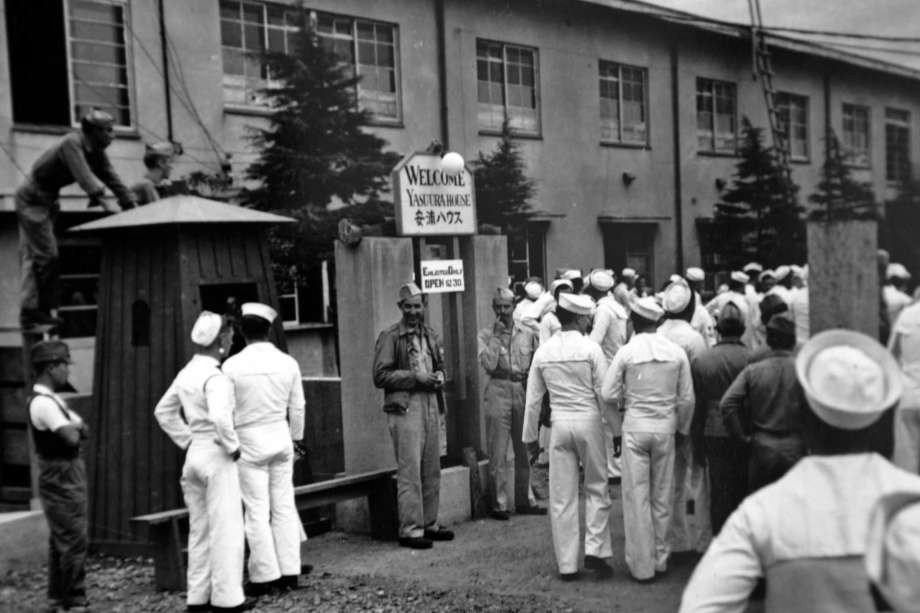
U.S. servicemen walking into Yasuura House, one such center

The Recreation and Amusement Association (Japanese: 特殊慰安施設協会, Hepburn: Tokushu Ian Shisetsu Kyōkai; lit. 'Special Comfort Facility Association') or RAA, was the largest of the organizations established by Japanese authorities to provide organized prostitution to prevent rapes and sexual violence by Allied occupation troops on the general population, and to create other leisure facilities for occupying Allied troops immediately following World War II. The RAA recruited 55,000 women and was short-lived.

== Background ==
On August 21, 1945, Japanese authorities decided to set up a RAA for the benefit of Allied occupation troops. In fact at that time, the Home Ministry had already sent a directive to prefectural governors and police chiefs on August 18 ordering them to make preparations for "comfort facilities" in areas that the Allied occupation troops would be stationed. These facilities (which included dance halls, restaurants, and bars in addition to brothels) were intended to be staffed by women already involved in the "water trade". However, because there were not enough women in the "water trade" and there were an abundance of women facing food scarcity, recruitment was broadened with newspaper ads that obscured the nature of the work while promising food, clothing, and shelter. Government officials used patriotic language in describing the comfort facility system, extolling the women who sacrifice themselves to be "patriotic dikes" preventing sexual violence against Japanese women and girls.

Japanese authorities set up the brothels with the intent of reducing the amount of sexual violence committed by the incoming Allied occupation troops.

Some 50,000 women, most of them as prostitutes, worked for the RAA. The first brothel, named Komachien Garden and employing 150 women, was opened on September 20, 1945. RAA brothels were placed off limits in March 1946, after just seven months of operation, to stop the spread of sexually transmitted diseases, and closed down shortly thereafter.

According to Tanaka Yuki, General Ishii Shirō's mistress recruited Japanese females as prostitutes for the Recreation and Amusement Association where up to 70,000 Japanese females were forced to serve US soldiers in brothels. However figures given by Tanaka Yuki had been disputed by Brian Walsh.

== Establishment ==
Although arrangements in most of the country were left to local officials and police departments, in the case of the Tokyo area, which was to host the largest number of foreign troops, a different approach was taken. Nobuya Saka, Superintendent-General of the Metropolitan Police Headquarters, met with Hamajirō Miyazawa and Genjirō Nomoto, the heads of the Tokyo Restaurant Association (東京料理飲食業組合, Tōkyō Ryōri Inshokugyō Kumiai), and asked them to help make arrangements for the soon to arrive troops. Miyazawa and Nomoto used their connections to gather together a group of representatives of the nightclub, bar, and brothel industries. These representatives then met with the police on the 21st where they were formally asked to establish "comfort facilities", but to conceal the government's role as much as possible. On August 23, these men formed the "Special Comfort Facilities Association" (renamed the Recreation and Amusement Association shortly later).

The RAA utilized the patriotic language of the war years in its operations, stressing the "selfless" nature of its employees. At the inauguration of the RAA (which was attended by bureaucrats and police officials), an "oath" was read:

And so we unite and go forward to where our beliefs lead us, and through the sacrifice of several thousands of "Okichis of our era" build a breakwater to hold back the raging waves and defend and nurture the purity of our race, becoming as well an invisible underground pillar at the root of the postwar social order... we are but offering ourselves for the defense of the national polity.

The "Okichi" referenced was the possibly legendary maid of Townsend Harris, the first American consul in Japan from 1856 to 1861, who was pressured into becoming his consort.

The organization was funded through unsecured loans from the Japan Industrial Development Bank (日本勧業銀行, Nippon Kangyō Ginkō) arranged by Hayato Ikeda, director of the Ministry of Finance's Tax Bureau. 33 million yen were loaned to the RAA, which then distributed shares to its members. The RAA established its first brothel on August 28: the Komachien in Ōmori. By December 1945, the RAA owned 34 facilities, 16 of which were "comfort stations". The total number of women employed by the RAA amounted to 55,000 at its peak.

== Recruitment ==
As noted above, the women staffing comfort facilities were initially intended to be those already involved in the "water trade" (a euphemism for the Japanese night-time entertainment business). In practice, there were nowhere near enough prostitutes available, especially in the Tokyo area. The government had cracked down on prostitution late in the war, and many women had fled or been evacuated to the countryside following heavy Allied bombing of strategic centers and residential areas. Tokyo's most famous red-light district, Yoshiwara, had been reduced from a prewar population of 2,000 prostitutes to only a few dozen by the end of the war. Therefore, it was inevitable that efforts were made to recruit from the general population, a tactic that was authorized by the police.

The RAA recruited widely, using carefully worded advertisements posted in front of their offices and in newspapers. These boasted of generous work conditions (free accommodation, meals, and clothes) while avoiding details concerning the nature of the work. Given the widespread poverty and food shortages at the time, and the large number of orphaned and widowed young women, the job offers appeared quite attractive. Most women left upon learning of the deception, but some stayed.

In addition to prostitutes, the RAA recruited a large number of "dancers" who were paid to dance with soldiers. Over time, the distinction between "dancer" and "prostitute" became blurred.

Heavy use was made of independent brokers to recruit women. These brokers, many of whom were affiliated with the yakuza, used less ethical recruitment techniques. The Women's Volunteer Corps (女子挺身隊, Jōshi Teishin-tai), a government organization for mobilizing girls and women ages 14–25 for work in factories, was a popular target as many of these women were left unemployed and stranded by the end of the war. Yuki Tanaka reports that groups of these women would be deceived and delivered to brothels.

Despite these deceptive recruitment practices, most women working in the comfort stations ultimately consented to work as prostitutes. There were also women who were unable to leave their brothels, however, because they had been sold by their impoverished families or because they owed money to the brothel. Some comfort stations used "company store" tactics and loan advances (前借, maegari) to keep women in debt and unable to leave, something a contemporary GHQ official compared to "enslavement". Contracts forcing women to work at brothels in repayment of debts were eventually abolished by a SCAP order (SCAPIN 642) in January 1946, although some Japanese officials were skeptical of how well such a prohibition could be enforced.

== Working conditions ==
When using the RAA brothels, GIs received a ticket (costing ¥100) (approx. 8 cents at the contemporary unofficial rate, equivalent to $1.32 in 2025) upon entry which was then given to the women who serviced them. The women, who usually had between 15 and 60 clients per day, would take the tickets to the station's accounting office each morning where they would receive ¥50 for each ticket. This 50% rate was considerably better than that for prewar licensed prostitutes, who commonly only received 25% of their price. For example, on the first day, one Japanese worker had 47 American customers and received around 2 US dollars.

Women working in RAA facilities faced the sexual violence common to prostitution in the sex trade (especially under foreign military occupation). Women working as dancers were especially vulnerable targets for rape. Additionally, military police and GIs sometimes demanded free service or refunds. The power inequality between Japanese police and Allied soldiers made it difficult for the women to complain. Many of the victims were induced to create a "Labour Union", which then allowed them to be further targeted as the Korean War developed.

== Expansion ==
On October 14, the Japanese police lifted their restrictions on brothels and night clubs, a de facto endorsement of the non-RAA sex industry catering to Occupation troops. The RAA facilities had also been illegal, but had enjoyed police protection. By the end of November, there were 25 non-RAA comfort stations employing 1,500 women in Tokyo (compared to "well over 2,000" for the RAA.) A December 29 GHQ estimate placed the number of prostitutes in Tokyo at 6,000 (not counting street prostitutes, who far outnumbered the number of women working in brothels.)

== GHQ and disease control ==
From the beginning of the Occupation, some Allied military officials cooperated with the Japanese government's system. According to the governors of Chiba and Kanagawa prefectures, American commanders contacted them in September 1945 and requested the establishment of brothels for their troops, offering US military police help if necessary. American medical officers established prophylactic stations in red-light districts and inside the larger brothels that distributed tens of thousands of condoms per week.

Despite these precautions, the problem of sexually transmitted diseases (STDs; primarily gonorrhea and syphilis) became a serious public health issue. By early 1946, nearly a quarter of all US occupation forces were estimated to be infected, and nearly half of some units. The Australian 34th Infantry Brigade had a rate of 55% infection.

In response, GHQ imposed strict STD check procedures for prostitutes, placed certain brothels with high rates of infection off-limits to troops, and helped re-establish clinics and laboratories (many of which had been destroyed during the war) to diagnose infections. Most importantly, the 8th Army authorized the free dispersal of penicillin to infected prostitutes, despite a serious shortage of the drug in the US, and orders from Washington that it only be given to Japanese "as a life saving measure."

== End of the system ==
Not all those in the occupation forces accepted the widespread patronizing of Japanese-sanctioned brothels by US troops. Some unit commanders considered prostitution an "endemic problem that plagued their troops" and tried (with limited success) to prevent their men from fraternizing with the Japanese. By early 1946 military chaplains were condemning SCAP's cooperation, citing violations of War Department policies and the moral degradation of US troops it caused.

The complaints embarrassed Gen. MacArthur, head of the occupation forces, and SCAP issued an order (SCAPIN 642) on January 21 ending licensed brothels for being "in contravention of the ideals of democracy". The following day a GHQ public health official wrote MacArthur with his concerns that news of the STD problem and GHQ cooperation with prostitution would cause problems as they spread back home. SCAPIN 642 ended the RAA's operations, but did not affect "voluntary prostitution" by individuals. As such, non-RAA brothel owners were easily able to circumvent the order by, for example, "renting" space in their former brothels to "voluntary" prostitutes. Ultimately, GHQ responded by making all brothels and other facilities offering prostitution off-limits to Allied personnel on March 25, 1946.

The immediate effects of the end of authorized brothel prostitution was the sudden unemployment of thousands of women, many of whom went on to become panpan street prostitutes. The dispersal of prostitution made it harder for GHQ to control STDs and also caused an increase in sexual violence by GIs, from an average of 40 women a day before the SCAP order to an estimated 330 per day immediately after, however these figures cannot be independently confirmed.

By November 1946, the Japanese government had introduced the new akasen (赤線, "red-line") system in which prostitution was permissible in certain designated areas.

== Comfort Woman terminology ==
Because the RAA and related systems were inspired by Japanese wartime experiences, their structures and terminologies were based on the pre-existing wartime comfort women system. Brothels were referred to with the euphemisms "comfort stations" and "comfort facilities", and prostitutes were referred to as "comfort women". Because of this, many English-language and Japanese scholars of the RAA continue to use those terms in their research.

However, to what degree the two systems are actually comparable is a matter of debate among historians. Some, such as Michael Molasky and Yuki Tanaka, stress the "striking" similarities between the two and refer to the RAA as "systematic exploitation". Chung-hee Sarah Soh, by contrast, notes that women in the RAA were provided with better living conditions than their wartime counterparts. Sarah Kovner states that a difference between the two systems is that RAA members could not be forced into prostitution for Allied occupation troops, while Bob Wakabayashi writes that coercive recruitment was employed in a manner similar to the wartime system.

Ikuhiko Hata indicates that the two systems were comparable in both methods of recruitment and administration in spite of the difference of the presence or absence of intermediary people.

== See also ==
- Comfort women
- Elizabeth Saunders Home
- United States military and prostitution in South Korea
- Prostitution in Japan
- Rape during the occupation of Japan
