= Akasen =

Historic slang term for red-light districts in 1940s-50s Japan

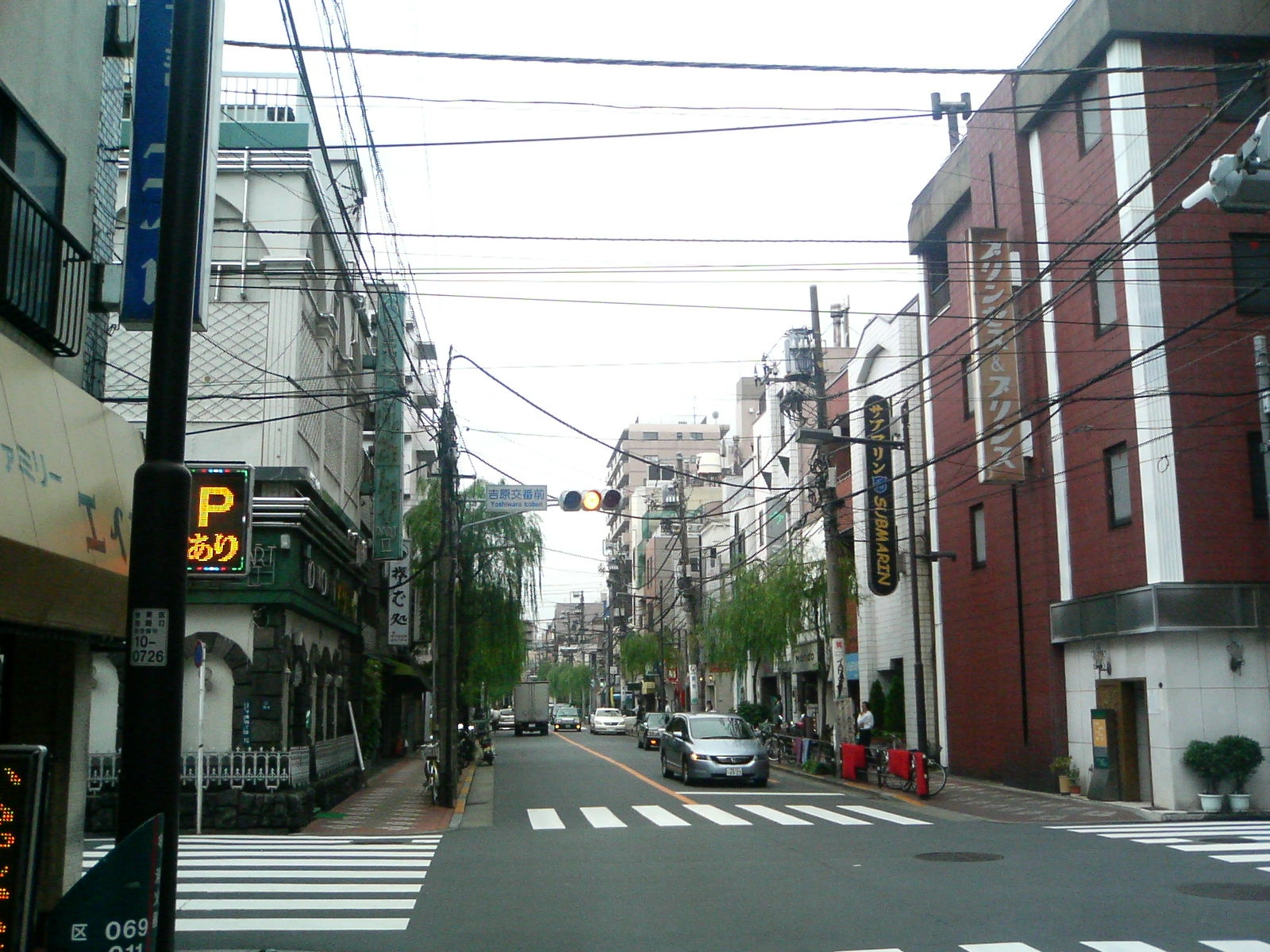
Yoshiwara, a former akasen district, seen in 2006

Akasen (赤線) was the Japanese slang term for districts historically engaged in the sex work industry in Japan, specifically within the time period of January 1946 through to March 1958.

== Etymology ==
The term 'akasen' literally translates as "red-line". Though similar to another term previously used for red-light districts, "yūkaku", 'akasen' was used as a collective term for red-light districts only between 1946 and 1958, following an issue ordered by GHQ (SCAPIN 642) nationwide to abolish Japan's legalised system of sex work.

Another term, 'aosen' (青線, lit. "blue-line"'), was used for "non-permitted" or "non-legal" sex industry districts. In Tokyo, Tamanoi (now called Higashi Mukōjima), the area directly across the Sumida River from Yoshiwara, was a well-known aosen district; it features in some of Kafū Nagai's short stories.

The term 'akasen' is often compared directly with the term "red-light district" in the west. However, this does not explain why the counterpart "non-permitted districts" were known as aosen (blue-line) districts. In practice, "aosen" and "akasen" referred to the colors on municipal zoning maps that outlined brothel districts (akasen) and "normal" entertainment districts (aosen).

== History ==
The precursor of akasen districts were yūkaku (遊廓), legal red-light districts in Japan where both brothels and sex workers (known collectively as yūjo (遊女, lit. "woman of pleasure"), the higher ranks of which were known as oiran (花魁)) recognised by the Japanese government operated. In January 1946, the Supreme Commander for the Allied Powers issued an order (SCAPIN 642) nationwide to abolish this licensed sex work system. This had a number of impacts on yūkaku areas, the largest of which was the yūkaku being renamed as "akasen" (赤線) districts. Brothels had to rename themselves as either cafés (カフェ) or ryōtei (料亭), sex workers were no longer bound by state-guaranteed contracts, and all known houses of sex work were declared to have "Off Limits" status by SCAP GHQ. The order also had the effect of disbanding the short-lived Recreation and Amusement Association, which had, for a period of one year, worked to ensure that sex workers were not abused and exploited by stationed American soldiers, amongst other things.

Despite the increased restrictions and the restructuring of the sex work industry, commercial brothels continued to operate within the law, with akasen districts remaining the designated regions for state-regulated sex work. Due to GHQ orders, hundreds of brothels began to front non-adult faces of their businesses (such as coffee shops, cafés and beer halls), but would offer sexual services to customers, creating new avenues for the sex industry to continue, especially in popular districts such as Yoshiwara, the akasen region of Tokyo.

However, following the partial disbanding of traditional red-light areas, formerly law-abiding akasen sex work businesses began operating within aosen areas, creating difficulties for the SCAP to identify brothels and continue its "Off Limits" policy.

In 1958, the Anti-Prostitution Law (売春防止法, baishun-bōshi-hō) was enforced, thus officially abolishing legalised sex work, the red-light akasen districts and their label of 'akasen'.

Despite the criminalisation of sex work, by the beginning of the 21st century, businesses such as soaplands (ソープランド, sōpurando) and fashion health (ファッションヘルス, fashion herusu) massage parlours had come into existence, regulated under the Businesses Affecting Public Morals Regulation Act (風俗営業等の規制及び業務の適正化等に関する法律), also known as Fūzoku Eigyō Torishimari Hō (風俗営業取締法) or fueiho. These businesses, which avoid criminalisation through offering only non-coital sex acts, are required to file a license application for permission to abide by the sex industry law (風俗営業法, Fūzoku-Eigyō-Hō) to remain in operation.

== See also ==
- Prostitution in Japan
- Hanamachi
- Panpan girls
- Street of Shame ('akasen chitai') Kenji Mizoguchi's 1956 film
- Susukino, a well-known red-light district in Sapporo, Hokkaido
- Yūkaku
