= Types of prostitution in modern Japan =

Prostitution, as defined under modern Japanese law, is the illegal practice of sexual intercourse with an 'unspecified' (unacquainted) person in exchange for monetary compensation, which was criminalised in 1956 by the introduction of article 3 of the Anti-Prostitution Law (売春防止法, Baishun bōshi hō). However, the definition of prostitution made illegal under this law is limited to sexual intercourse with an 'unspecified person', and the law does not criminalise the sale of other acts performed by sex workers in exchange for compensation, such as oral sex, anal sex, mammary intercourse, and other non-coital sex acts; the Businesses Affecting Public Morals Regulation Law of 1948 (風俗営業取締法, Fūzoku eigyō torishimari hō), also known as the "Law to Regulate Adult Entertainment Businesses", as amended, regulates these businesses, making only one definition of prostitution in Japan illegal.

Following the criminalisation of payment for sexual intercourse, the sex industry in Japan has developed into a number of varied businesses offering services not prohibited under Japanese law. These fall into a number of categories known by various euphemistic names, such as "soaplands", "fashion health shops", and "pink salons"; the English word "health" often implies sexual services. These businesses typically operate from physical premises, either with their own employees or freelancers such as call girls, who may operate via Internet dating sites known as deai sites (出会いサイト, lit. "meeting sites") or via "delivery health" services.

== Fashion health ==
Fashion health (ファッションヘルス, fasshon herusu), also known as "fashion massage", is a form of massage parlor which circumvents Japanese laws by offering a range of services that stop short of sexual intercourse. Fashion health clubs are typically found in most of Japan's larger cities, in premises decorated with bright flashing lights and generally bright and garish decor. They commonly post pictures of their "masseuse" employees near the entrance, though the face and eyes may be censored with pixellation or black strips; some club entrances feature caricatured depictions of the services provided. These businesses were especially known by that name in the 1980s.

== Delivery health ==
Delivery health (デリバリーヘルス, Deribarii herusu), also known as "shutchō health" (出張ヘルス) or by the abbreviation deriheru (デリヘル), is a category of sex work in Japan that offers a "call girl" or escort service, dispatching sex workers to their customers' homes or to hotels. Delivery health businesses do not typically have physical premises, instead employing freelancers, and advertise through handouts sent to mailboxes, posters in telephone booths, public toilets and similar places, usually in large cities within Japan; advertising is also conducted through a number of websites online.

== Image club ==
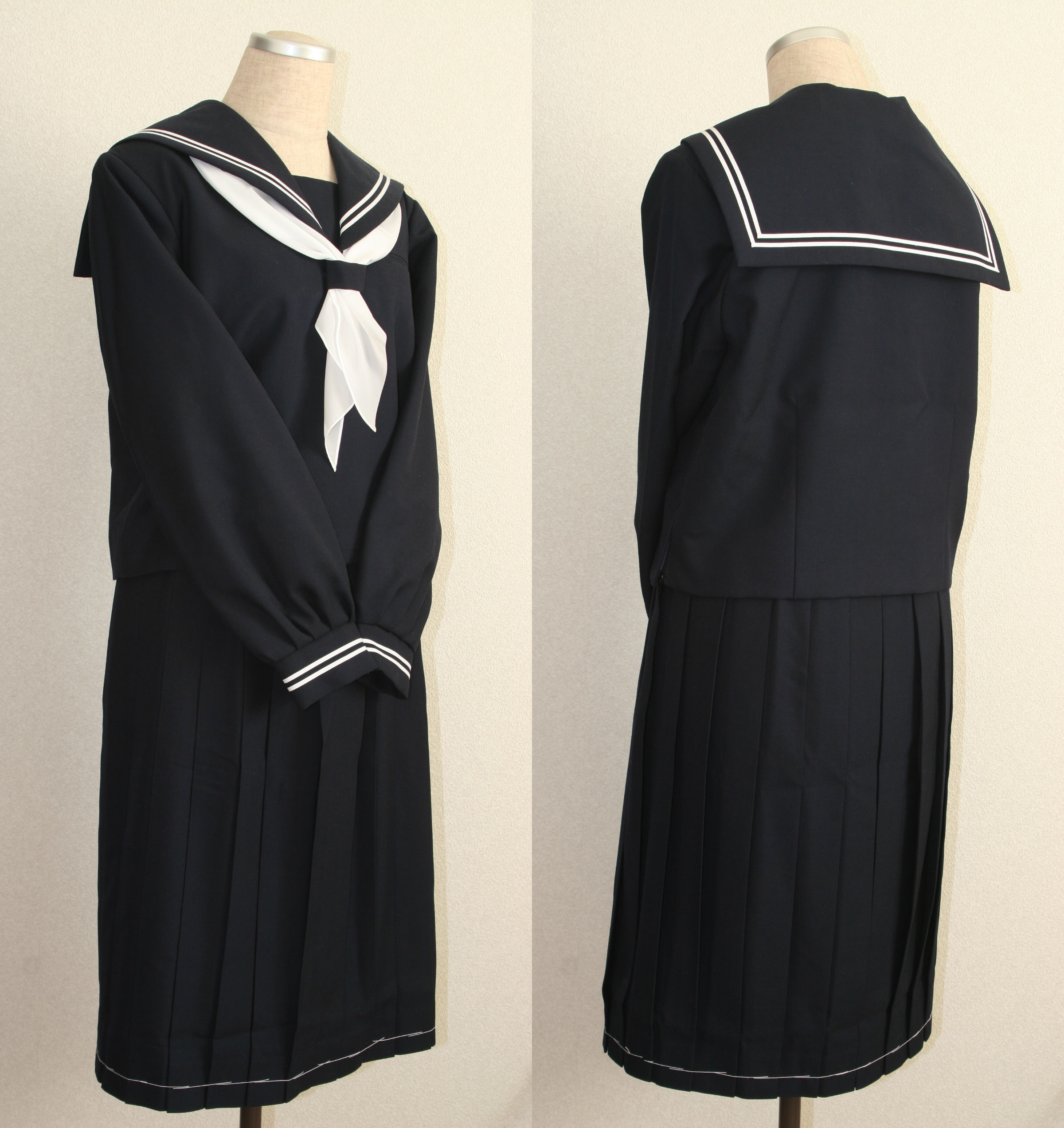
This uniform is an example of the costumes worn in image clubs.

An image club (イメージクラブ, imējikurabu), or imekura (イメクラ), is a type of brothel in Japan similar to fashion health parlors, differing in that image clubs are typically themed in the style of common or popular sexual fantasies, such as an office, a doctor's office, a classroom, or a train carriage. Sex workers employed at image clubs, whose activities are usually limited to oral sex, wear exaggerated costumes appropriate to the setting and the desire of the customer. Image clubs simulating molestation of female train passengers became popular in the wake of stricter enforcement of laws against groping on trains.

Image clubs may offer itemized pricing for particular services, such as taking instant photographs, removing a woman's underwear or taking it home. Women working at image clubs were paid around 30,000 (US$270) to 35,000 (US$320) yen per day, and possibly more than 1 million (US$9,112) yen per month as of 2008.

== Pink salon ==
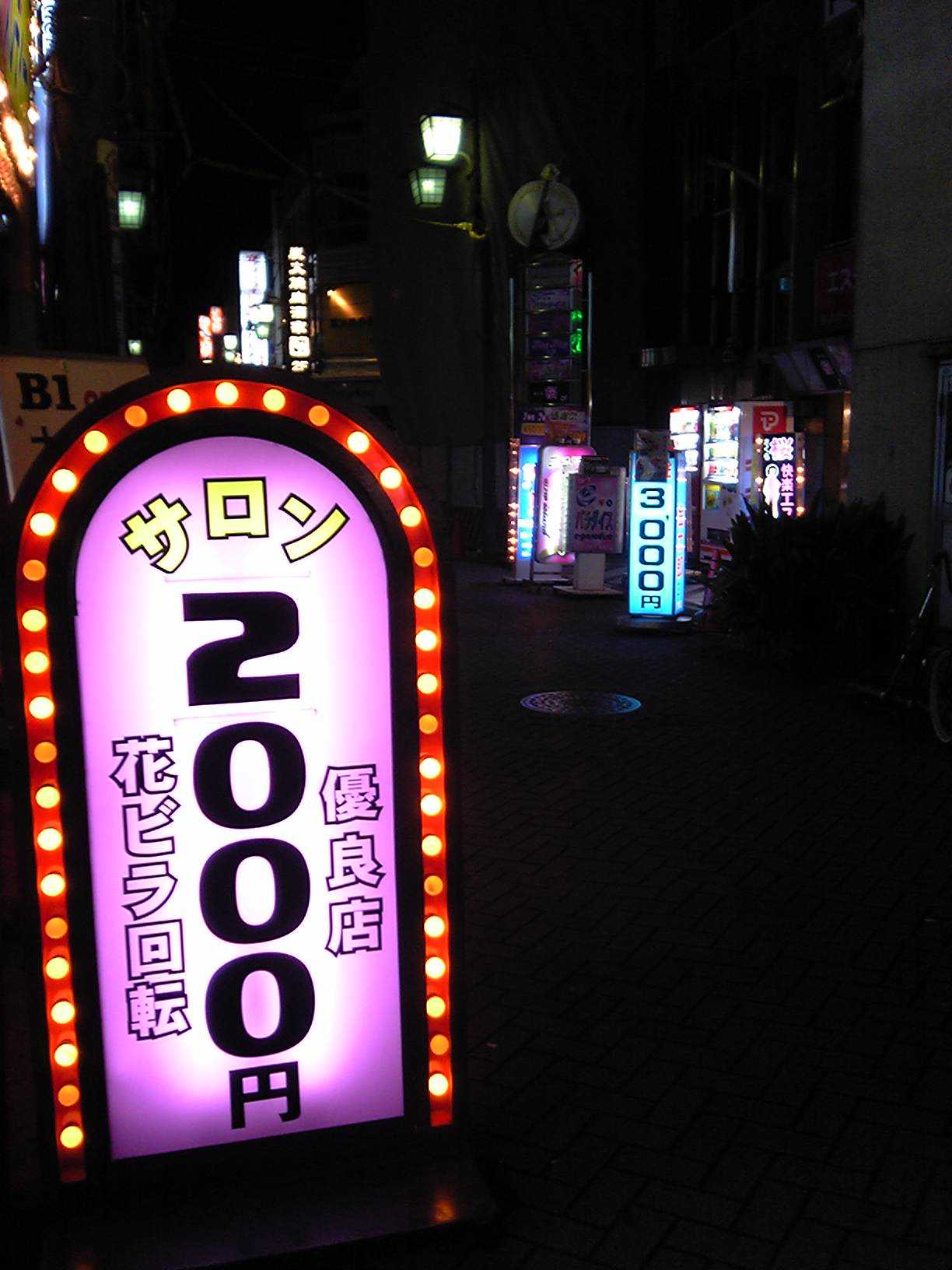
Pink salons in Japan

A pink salon (ピンクサロン, pinkusaron), or pinsaro (ピンサロ) for short, is a type of brothel in Japan which specialises in oral sex. Pink salons avoid criminalisation under Japanese law by serving food, and often drinks; operating without showers or private rooms; and not providing vaginal sex. Pink salons may also offer additional activities such as fingering the service provider and sumata (intercrural sex). Pink salons are found across Japan; however, most do not accept foreigners.

== Soapland ==
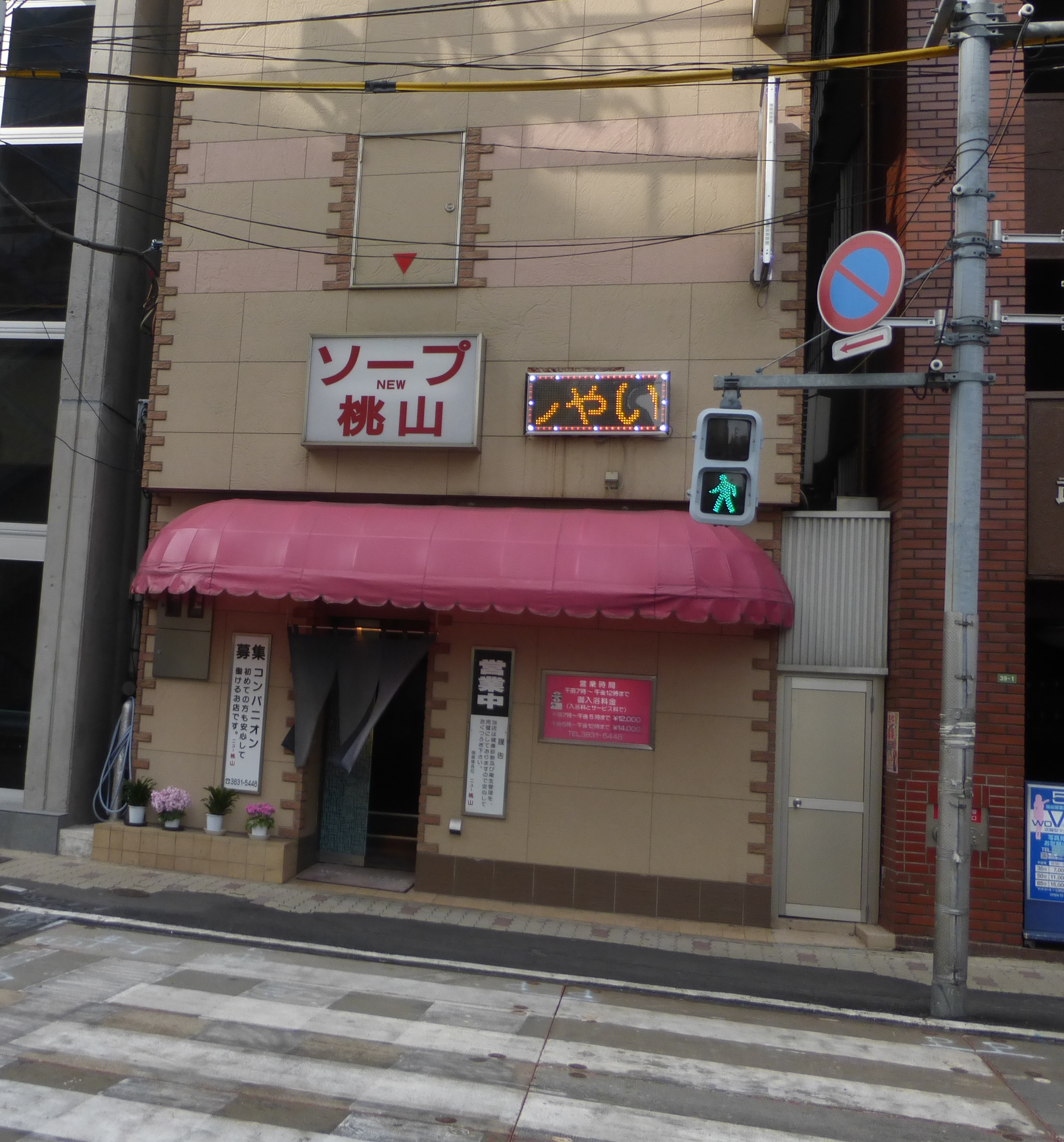
The front of one soapland shop in 2015

Soapland (ソープランド, sōpurando), or sōpu, which first developed following the criminalisation of compensated sexual intercourse with unacquainted persons in the late 1950s, began as a simple bathhouse service where women washed men's bodies. Originally referred to as toruko-buro, meaning 'Turkish bath', the businesses were renamed following a 1984 campaign by Turkish scholar Nusret Sancaklı, with the name "soapland" chosen as the winning entry in a nationwide contest. The term is a wasei-eigo term, constructed from the two English words soap and land.

Soaplands exploit a loophole in Japanese law, wherein compensated sexual intercourse may be conducted between "specified" (acquainted) persons. In his book Fuzoku Eigyo Torishimari (Control of Sex Business Operations), Kansai University professor Yoshikazu Nagai documented the practice of soapland businesses, wherein customers pay an entry fee to "use the bathing facilities", and a separate fee for a massage. Whilst the massage takes place, the masseuse and the customer become "acquainted", resulting in any paid sexual services following this as not being viewed as prostitution as defined by the law, an interpretation that has been utilised since the 1960s. However, some soaplands have, in previous decades, been prosecuted for violating the Anti-Prostitution Law, having been deemed to be places of prostitution, resulting in the cessation of these businesses.

A number of types of soaplands exist, typically located in complexes with varying numbers of soaplands. Well-known complexes can be found in Susukino in Sapporo, Yoshiwara and Kabukicho in Tokyo, Kawasaki, Kanazuen in Gifu, Ogoto in Shiga, Fukuhara in Kobe, Sagaminumata in Odawara, and Nakasu in Fukuoka. A number of other areas, especially in onsen ('hot springs') towns, also feature soaplands. Although the main clientele for soaplands are men, there are also a few soaplands for female clients without sexual services. Prices for a session at a soapland vary depending on location, time of day, rank of provider, and length of the session.

== Sumata ==
Sumata (素股, "bare crotch"), translated as "intercrural sex", is the Japanese term for a non-penetrative sex act popular in Japanese brothels. It is a form of genital-genital rubbing performed by a female sex worker upon a male client. The sex worker rubs the client's penis with her thighs (intercrural sex) and labia majora. The goal is to stimulate ejaculation without penile vaginal penetration, an activity circumventing the Anti-Prostitution Law.

== See also ==
- Alibi-ya
- No-pan kissa
- Nuru (massage)
- Prostitution in Japan
