= Ianfu =

Japanese term ianfu (慰安婦,いあんふ) directly translates to "comforting women" and is a euphemism for "comfort women", or Sexual slaves for the Japanese Imperial Military. It refers to:

- Comfort women, an estimated 200,000 women from all across Asia, mainly Korea, China, the Philippines, the Netherlands and other Japanese occupied countries, who were enslaved for sexual purposes by the Imperial Japanese Army during World War II
- Recreation and Amusement Association, Japanese organization which provided organized prostitution and other leisure facilities for occupying Allied troops in occupied Japan after World War II
- In Japanese this word can be used to signify military prostitutes or brothels generally; see ja:慰安婦
