= Susukino =

District located in Sapporo, Hokkaido, Japan

Coordinates: 43°3′19″N 141°21′13.7″E

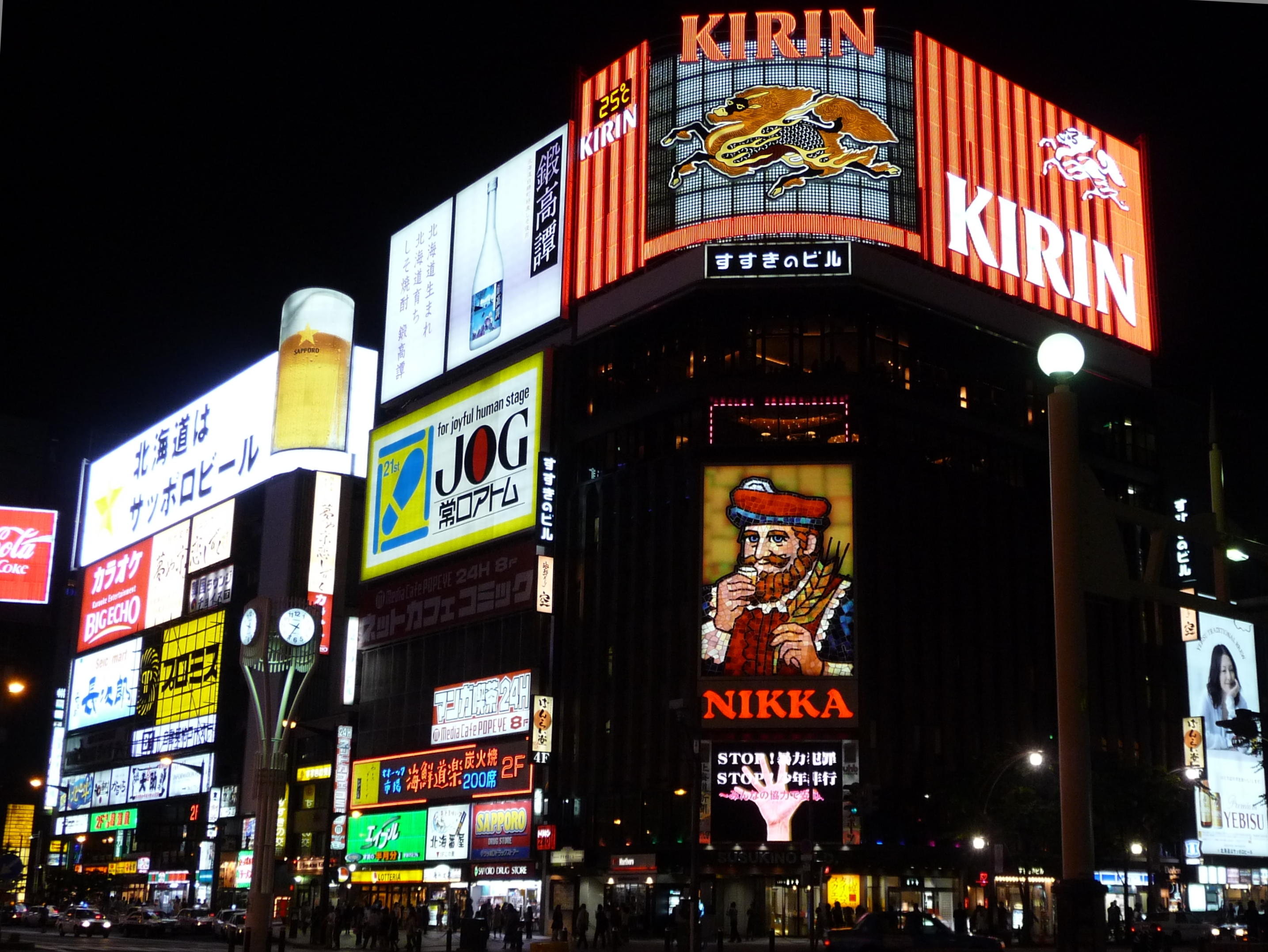
The Susukino Crossing at night with "King of blenders" of Nikka Whiskey on the Susukino Building

Susukino (すすきの) is a district in Chūō-ku, Sapporo, Hokkaidō, Japan known for entertainment and nightlife. The district contains many restaurants, bars, hotels, and adult-entertainment establishments. The name Susukino is often written as 薄野 in kanji and ススキノ in katakana, and directly translates as "zebra grass field".

== Name ==
The origins of the name Susukino are not definitely known. One theory is that the area currently known as Susukino was previously covered by Miscanthus sinensis (susuki). Another theory states that the Susukino is named after Tatsuyuki Usui (1829-1916), a supervisor in the construction of the red-light district in Sapporo (Usui is written as 薄井 in kanji, and the character 薄 refers to susuki grass in Japanese).

== Overview ==
Susukino is not an official designation of any municipality. Rather, it is a commonly used name for a rough area with uncertain borders. Susukino Tourist Association defines the area of Susukino as lying between the roadways of Minami 4 and Minami 6 to the north and south, and from Nishi 2 chome to Nishi 6 chome to the east and west.

The name Susukino is widely used in the names of landmarks, such as the Susukino Crossing, Susukino Station (a station of the Sapporo Street Car and Sapporo Municipal Subway).

== Area ==
Susukino Crossing is located between Nishi 3 chome, Minami 4 and Nishi 4 chome, Minami 4, and many neon signs were installed on the buildings along the street. One of those signs is the Nikka sign at the front of the Susukino Building, which has a painting of the Nikka symbol, the King of Blenders, and the background whose colors are changed one after the other. Every September, the Hokkaidō Marathon is held in Sapporo, and runners pass Ekimae Dōri through the Susukino Crossing and Susukino district, which leads to the finish line in Nakajima Park. Every August, the Susukino Festival is also held, and the line of people bearing Mikoshi parades down the street. The Ganso Rāmen Yokochō and Shin Rāmen Yokochō, where ramen restaurants are lined up along the pathway and visitors can have many types of the Sapporo ramen, are also located in the Susukino and are an attraction to sightseers.

== History ==
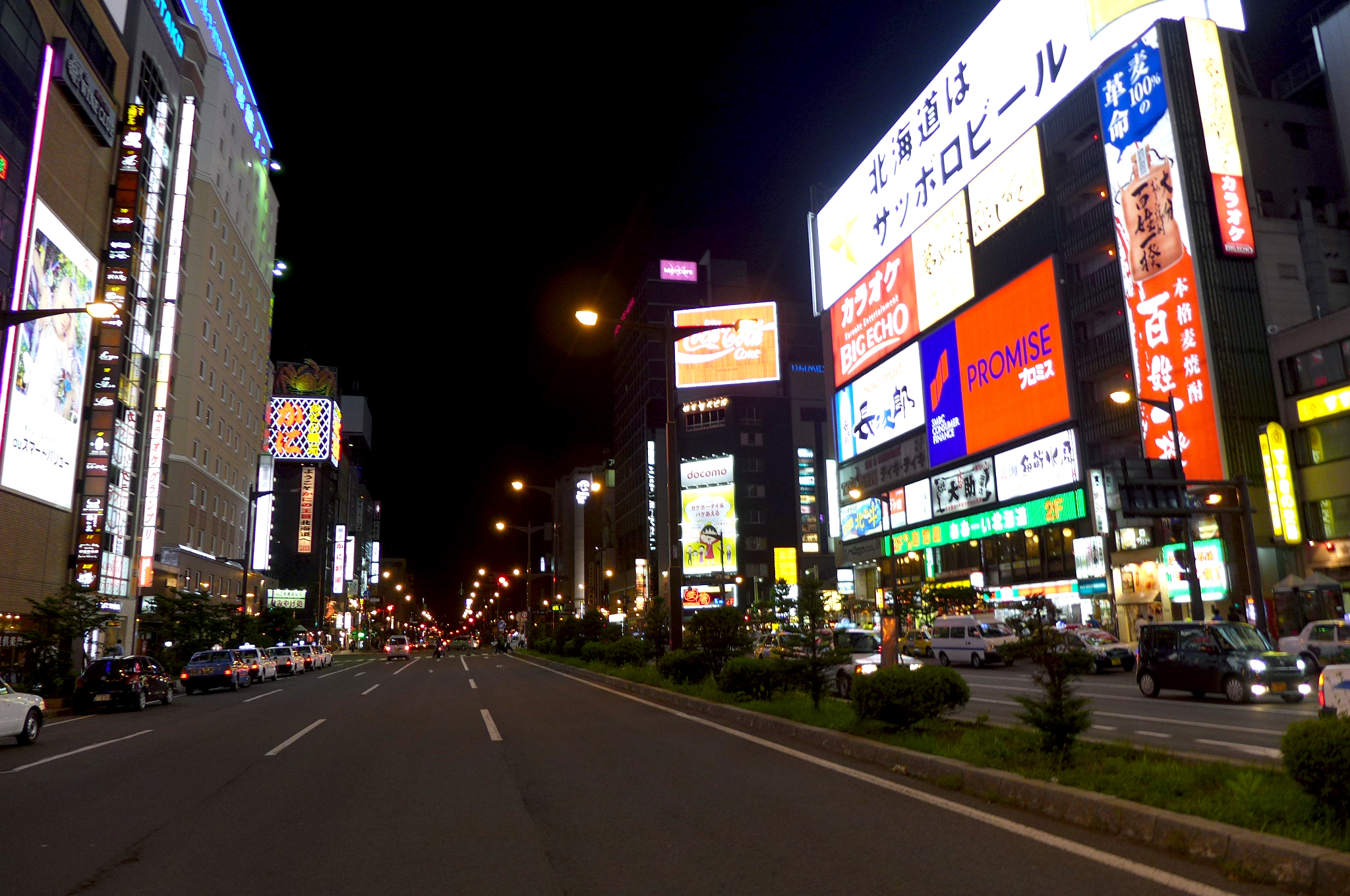
Susukino Crossing to the East

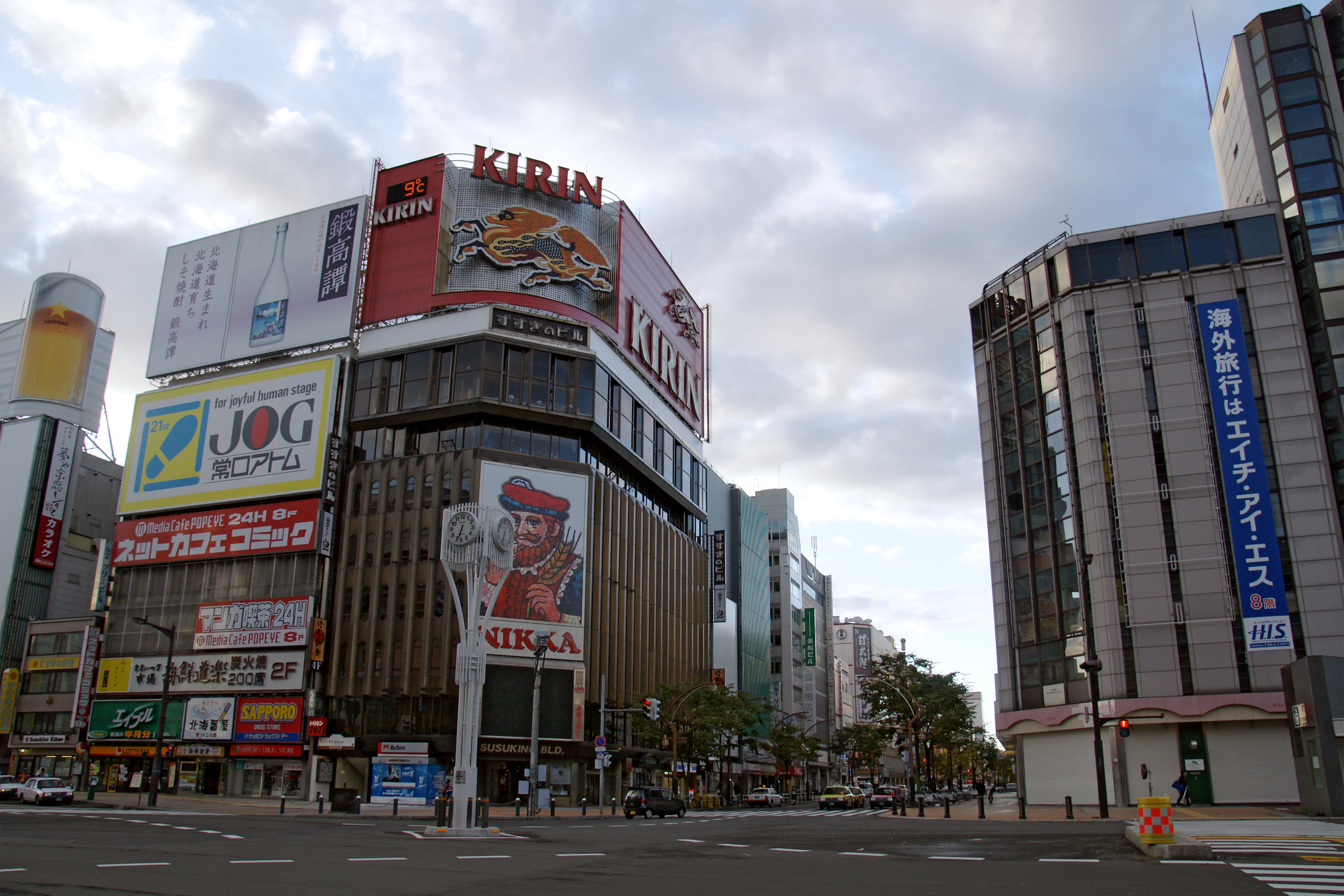
Susukino Crossing during the day

The Susukino area originated in 1871, when the Kaitaku-shi, the Settlement Envoyship pioneering Hokkaidō, designated the area from Minami 4 and Minami 5 to Nishi 3 chome and Nishi 4 chome as the red-light district. After the construction of the district, the Kaitaku-shi named this place as "Susukino Yūkaku" (Susukino red-light district), and integrated other brothels into this district. One of the reasons the Kaitaku-shi constructed a red-light district in this place was to keep laborers engaged in pioneering Hokkaidō in Sapporo.

In 1872, a 1.2 metres (3 ft 11 in) wall, 900 metres (3,000 ft) long, was erected around the Susukino Yūkaku and a gate was placed between Nishi 3 chome and Nishi 4 chome by Kaitaku-shi. In the fall of the same year, an act to emancipate prostitutes was announced by the new government, which had little influence on the district. With the establishment of licensed prostitution, the Susukino yūkaku and its surrounding area thrived. In 1880, Susukino Kōban (Susukino police box of the Sapporo Precinct) was placed in Susukino.

The transfer of the Susukino yūkaku to the neighbourhood of the Kamokamo River, headwaters of the Sousei River, was planned in 1901, in consideration of the elementary schools and women's professional schools that were located around the red-light district. The transfer, however, was not realised until the summer of 1920. Prior to this year, in 1918, the exposition of the 50th anniversary of Hokkaidō was held in the Nakajima Park, which was located close to the Susukino, and the Susukino Station of the Sapporo Street Car was also opened. Two years later, although the transfer of the red-light district was not carried out in time for the exposition, the district was moved to the place where Kikusui district in the Shiroishi-ku, Sapporo, is currently located.

After all the brothels in Susukino were removed, many restaurants, cafes, and movie theatres were constructed and popularized in their place. It was quiet during World War II, but the cabaret and dance hall were erected right after the War, and the American occupation troops also walked around the district. Susukino was not an akasen (red-line) district, an area where prostitution was acknowledged by the government, but was actually an aosen (blue-line) district, where a lot of restaurants and bars illegally promoted prostitution.

The Prostitution Prevention Act was enacted in 1958, however, prostitution in Susukino did not disappear. The street stalls were the actual hotbed of the promotion of the prostitution, which were eradicated by their compulsory removal by the government in 1964.

In the late 1960s, Sapporo City was reserved as the site of the 1972 Winter Olympics, and the expansion of the Sapporo Ekimae Dōri (Sapporo Street in front of the station), the construction of the Sapporo Municipal Subway Nanboku Line, and the maintenance of the underground shopping arcade, Sapporo Poletown, were carried out in around 1970. In 1974, a department store, Matsuzakaya Sapporo Branch (currently Robbinson's Sapporo Branch) was opened, which was the first department store in the district of the Susukino. Other notable buildings included the "Emperor", a huge cabaret which opened in 1973 and later closed its business in September 2006, and the "Mikado", another large cabaret which opened in 1974 and later closed in the spring of 1982. Since the late 1970s, disco-style bars began to be popular in Japan and many discos were constructed in Susukino, while nightclubs decayed.

In 1980s, a lot of hotels were constructed around the Susukino district. The Susukino Snow Festival (Susukino Kōri no Saiten) was held as a part of the Sapporo Snow Festival in 1983, and since that year, ice statues and other snow objects line up the street of the Susukino district every February. In 1986, a natural hot spring was dug into the ground of Susukino. This was called "Susukino Hot Springs", and is used currently in hotels in the Susukino area. The Hōsui-Susukino Station, a subway station of the Tōhō Line, Sapporo Municipal Subway, was inaugurated in 1988.

== In popular culture ==
- The 2012 video game Yakuza 5 features a playable area called Tsukimino, which is based on Susukino. One of the protagonists, Taiga Saejima, ventures to Susukino after his second escape from prison, to learn the truth about unfolding events surrounding being expelled from the Tojo Clan while incarcerated, while also having an unknown powerful force get his parole denied.
- The 1994 anime Marmalade Boy features an episode set in Susukino.
