= Panpan girls =

Post–War Japanese sex worker

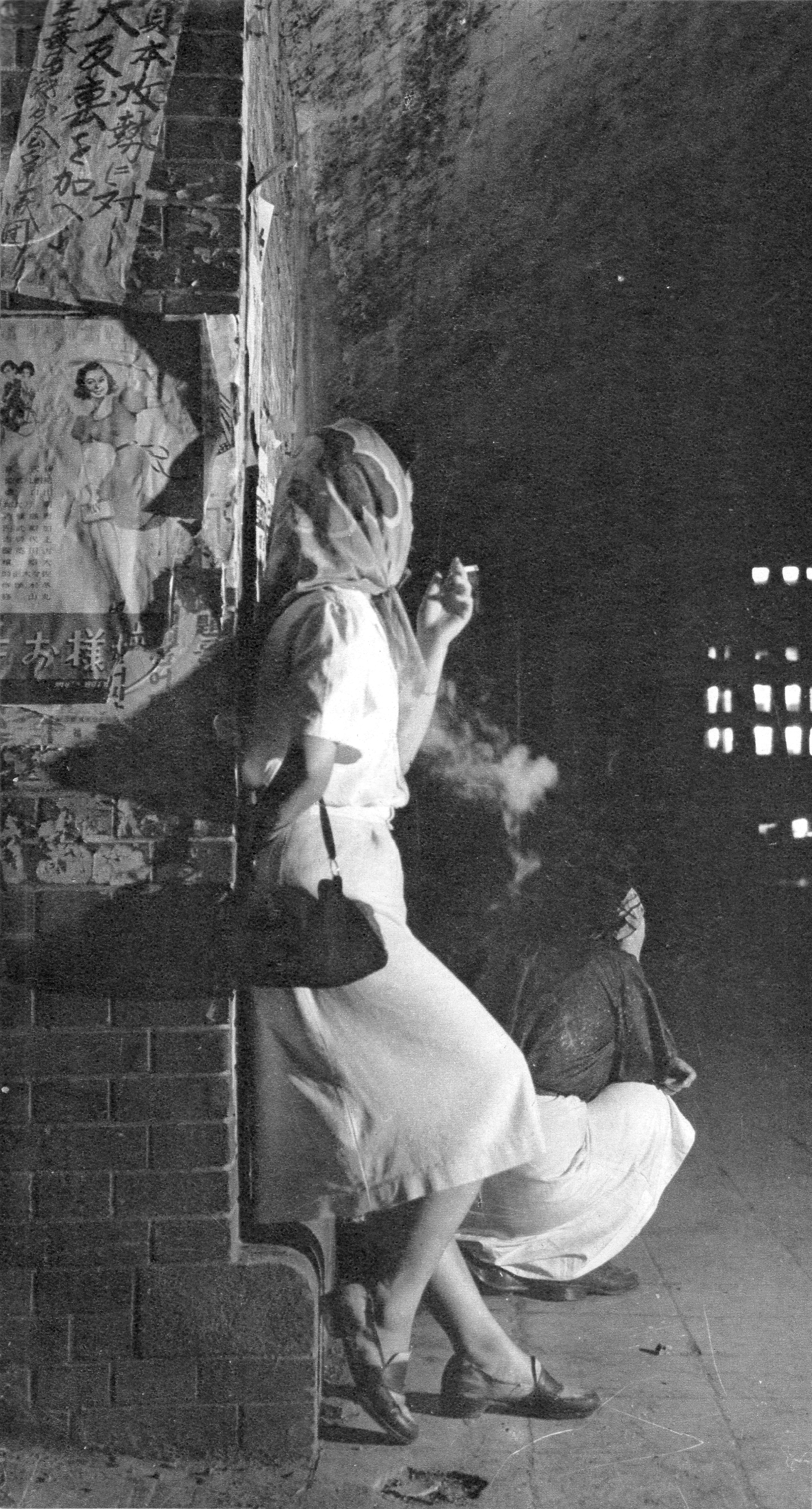
Panpan girls

Panpan girls (Japanese: パンパンガール, Hepburn: panpan gāru), also pom-pom (パンパン) or pansuke (パン助), were Japanese women who were either coerced or voluntarily engaged in sex work with Allied soldiers during the occupation of Japan. As the government (with the aid of police) set up unlicensed brothels, some women engaged in sex work to secure everyday officially provided necessities. Panpan girls were generally looked down upon by Japanese men, and cultural renditions of panpan girls have seen the phenomenon as a challenge to masculine identity. The reality of panpan girls is likely different from their cultural identity; since the end of the occupation, the term has shifted somewhat in understanding.

== Definition ==
According to film historian David A. Conrad, the term panpan originates from a term Japanese and American soldiers brought from the southern Pacific. Contemporaneously, panpan girls were considered a form of sex worker or escort. Sometimes the term was used to imply an exclusivity to the relationship or arrangement between the woman and the soldier, while some authors used it to refer to all kinds of sex workers, including those working in clubs and brothels. Those who engaged in private sex work were often not coerced into any vertical structure by pimps or police because they formed self-defence groups. Women who worked only for Americans were called yōpan, women who had one client were referred to as only (オンリー, onrī), while women with multiple clients were called butterfly.

== History ==
Following Imperial Japan's surrender at the end of the Second World War, but before the arrival of the Allied occupation forces, the interim Japanese government—with the help of police—set up a series of officially sanctioned, but unlicensed, brothels out of anxiety that the military forces would commit mass rape. The government recruited 50,000 young women to work in these brothels, which were closed in January 1946 due to the spread of venereal disease. To offset the extreme reluctance of women to engage in sex work, the police of Hiroshima Prefecture provided women who signed up with guaranteed daily provisions of beef, rice, sugar, and cooking oil.

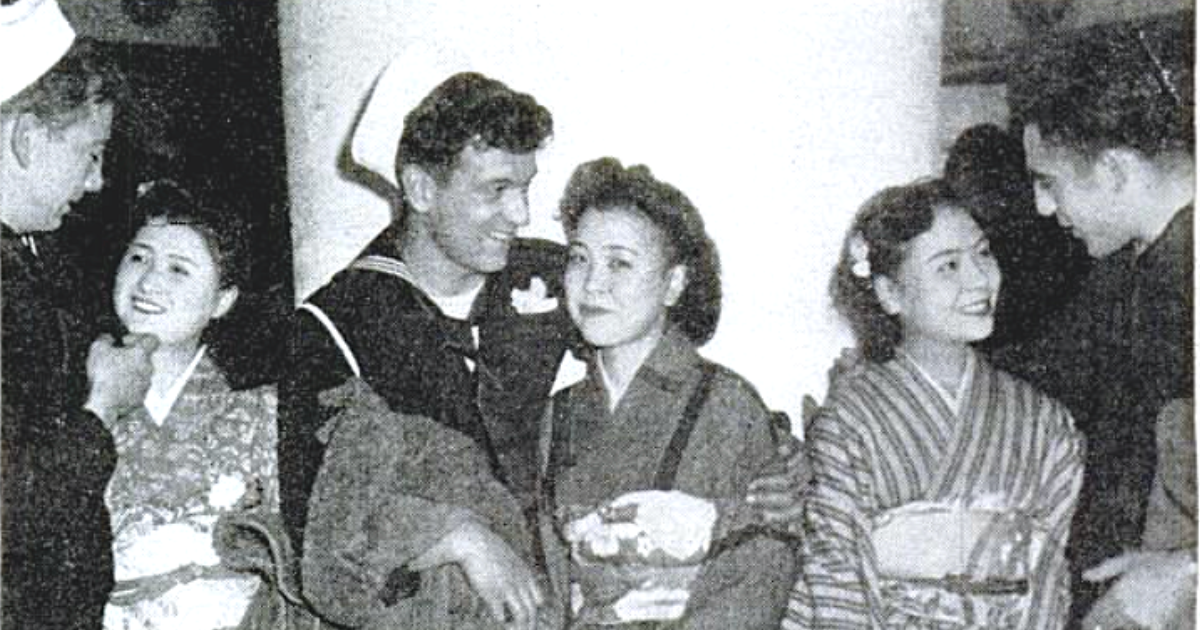
Japanese women employed to mix with Allied servicemen.

Following the American arrival in Japan, the women who were sex workers or hung around with Allied soldiers were viewed pejoratively by Japanese men. A contemporary public intellectual, Kanzaki Kiyoshi, wrote in the 1950s that soldiers referred to panpan girls and sex workers as "yellow stool". According to scholar Masakazu Tanaka, this language of Japanese men describing Japanese women who worked for Allied soldiers at cabarets, clubs, and brothels as 'public toilets' was created as an image of disgust by Japanese men who felt feminised by the loss of the War. Panpan girls would often escort soldiers, wearing high heels and dancing to American music.

After the occupation, some women who entered relationships with non-Japanese men voluntarily took a different, more accepting attitude towards the term panpan; with changing social mores around sex, a term referring to a black panpan girl (ブラパン, burapan) was coined by Japanese women who dated black men. The term burapan has also been used disparagingly by Japanese men in hip-hop communities to refer to Japanese women who have a black boyfriend.

== Culture ==
Most cultural renditions of panpan girls have common signifiers of appearance, i.e., lipstick, perfume, chewing gum, and speaking a hybrid of Japanese and English. Despite the image of them as hyper-sexual, Rumi Sakamoto argues that many existing photographs of them don't frame them as such, and that they were likely just young women with more access to commercial goods than others.

To Andrea Mendoza, the visibility of Allied soldiers walking around with Japanese girls established a metaphor of Western masculinity against an imagined feminine Japan. In Ango Sakaguchi's short stories, "One Woman and the War" and its sequel, the sexual experience of a woman (identified as an ex-streetwalker) is used as a prism to re-create a sense of Japanese masculine identity at the expense of the protagonist's agency. Similarly she criticises Taijiro Tamura's Gate of Flesh for reinforcing the idea of panpan girls as a kind of "double-defeat". East Asian scholar Ian Buruma identifies the absence of panpan girls in the film Drunken Angel (1948) to be conspicuous, and an intentional shift of focus away from western intrusion into Japanese life.

== See also ==
- Akasen
- Comfort women
- Geisha and prostitution
- Prostitution in Japan
- Rape during the occupation of Japan
- Recreation and Amusement Association
- War Brides Act
