= Yūkaku =

Licensed red-light districts in Japanese history

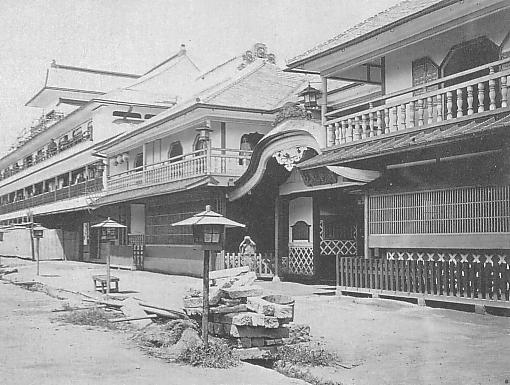
A yūkaku in Tokyo, 1872

Yūkaku (遊廓) were legal red-light districts in Japanese history, where both brothels and prostitutes - known collectively as yūjo (遊女, lit. "woman of pleasure"), the higher ranks of which were known as oiran - recognised by the Japanese government operated. Though prostitution was, officially, legal to engage in and pay for only in these areas, there were a number of places where prostitutes and brothels operated illegally, known as Okabasho (岡場所), the generic name for all unlicensed red-light districts other than Yoshiwara (later including both Shimabara and Shinmachi).

In January 1946, the occupying United States' GHQ issued an order (SCAPIN 642) nationwide to abolish Japan's legalised system of prostitution, with brothels in the yūkaku areas having to change their names to either that of café (カフェ) or ryōtei (料亭), with the yūkaku being renamed as akasen (赤線, lit. "red line") districts.

Following this, the Anti-Prostitution Law was passed in 1956, before being fully enforced two years later in 1958; though the law did not criminalise all forms of sex work, the sale of sex with "unspecified" (meaning in this context 'unacquainted') persons was outlawed, leading to the yūkaku, and later akasen, areas to cease to exist as they once had. In spite of this, the legal sale of some sex acts and services continues to this day within Japan, circumventing the Anti-Prostitution Law either through the sale of acts that do not involve penetrative sex, or through the sale of sex only to customers who have first been 'acquainted' with prostitutes.

== See also ==
- Asobi
- Akasen
- Hanamachi
- Red-light district
- Yoshiwara
