= Chishō Takaoka =

Famous Japanese geisha

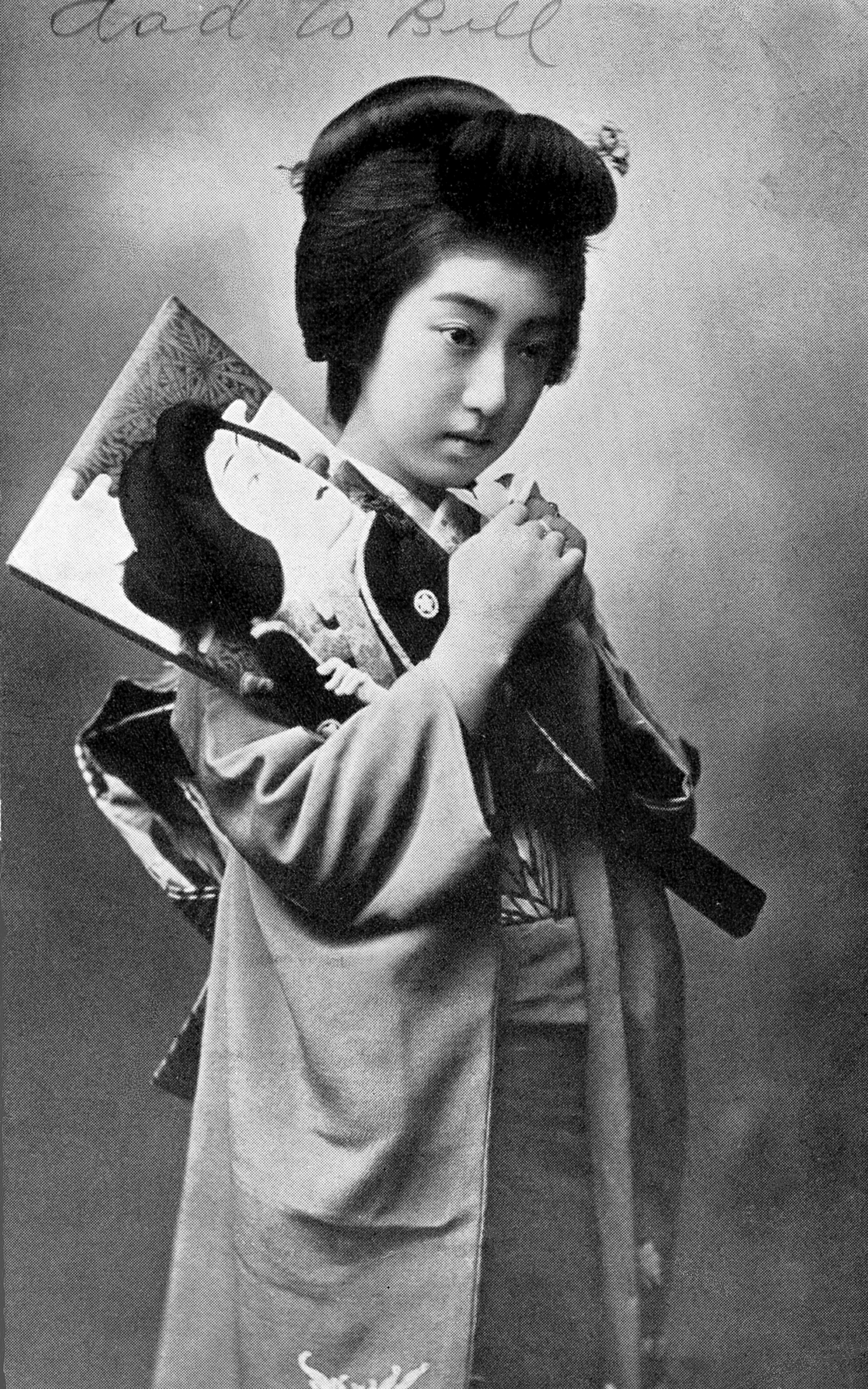
- A 1920 postcard
- Born: April 22, 1896; Nara Prefecture
- Died: October 22, 1994 (aged 98)
- Occupations: Geisha, Writer
- Writing career
- Genre: Novels
- Notable work: Shoyo zange (『照葉懺悔』)

Chishō Takaoka (高岡 智照 April 22, 1896 – October 22, 1994) was a geisha in Shinbashi who became a Buddhist nun later in life. Her stage name was Chiyoha (千代葉) or Teruha (照葉), while her real name was Tatsuko Takaoka (高岡たつ子). She became famous for her radiant beauty, and for chopping off one of her fingers for her lover. She was a popular model featured in postcards, and was known internationally as the "Nine-Fingered Geisha". She also inspired Jakucho Setouchi's novel, Jotoku.

== Childhood in Osaka ==
Chishō was born in 1896 in Nara Prefecture, but her birth notification was registered at Osaka city hall by her parents. Her father was an alcoholic who worked as a blacksmith. When Chishō was two years old, her mother, Oda Tsuru, died; some theories speculate that Tsuru ran away from home. Chishō was brought up lovingly by her grandmother, and when she was seven years old, she worked in her aunt's tea parlor as a waitress. At 12 years old, her father sold her into slavery, sending her to Oume Tsujii, concubine of kabuki actor Onoe Kikugorō V. At 14 years old, upon being given 250 yen employment preparation money, Chishō became the adopted daughter of Kagaya (Kashi zashiki), and debuted with the stage name "Chiyoha". Her unusual beauty helped her gain popularity, and her mizuage was bought by a chairperson of an Ōsaka stock exchange transaction.

At 15 years old, she became emotionally involved with Otomine, a famous playboy and upscale clothes dealer, who lived in Higashi ward (Kita hisahōchō). Chishō eloped with him to Beppu Onsen. When Otomine discovered she had a picture of a kabuki actor in her hand mirror, he became jealous and broke up with her. To convey her fidelity to Otomine, she cut off her pinky with a razor and brought it to him. It was also said that, when he was trying to cure his arthritis at the Beppu spa, she came over and proposed love suicide to him, but he refused it. Then she gave her own finger for the purpose of appealing for his love.

== Life in Tokyo ==
The scandal made it difficult for her to remain in Osaka, and she was taken under the care of Kiyoka, a geisha in Tokyo who was the mistress of Lord Taketarō Gōtō. She worked in Kōfuen, Mukōjima, and Kiyoka assumed 3,000 yen debt repayments. The day she debuted, she got word that her younger brother had been burned to death in a fire. Originally in nature she was a quiet geisha in the zashiki parlor, so when she was hit with the shock of the separation from Otomine and the news of her brother's death, she had cut off her finger. Many men came and saw her and she soon became a sought-after geisha. The many picture cards of her were a commercial commodity, and they sold quickly. Some men also illegally copied and sold them, and Chishō accused them of copyright infringement.

She had a modest talent as a geisha, having an academic goal. She learned the kanji by reading many books and later became a writer.

== From geisha to Buddhist sister ==
In 1919, Chishō married Suezo Oda, the market player of Kitahama and a runner for a motion picture company. She visited the United States with her husband and traveled across the entire country. During this time she lived in a girls' school dormitory while studying English for eight months. After returning home, her behavior in the U.S. created tensions in her marriage. She attempted suicide two times, and they divorced.

After this, she traveled back to the U.S. She went to London, and on her friend Sessue Hayakawa's advice, she moved to Paris where, it is said, she gave birth to a child.

After returning home, she worked as a geisha. In 1923, under the name of Teruha Oda, she starred in the film "Ai no tobira" (The Gate of Love) directed by Shiro Nakagawa. She then remarried to a medical doctor and ran a bar in Osaka.

In 1928, she wrote the first of five autobiographies, titled "Teruha Zange". In 1935, at 39 years old, she entered the Buddhist priesthood in Temple Kume, and referred to herself as Chisho (智照). She went to Giōji in Kyoto, which had been ruined, and rebuilt it. Giōji attracted attention among wounded women as a refuge.

In 1963, Jakucho Setouchi wrote the novel Jotoku, which was inspired by Chisho's life. She died in 1994 at the age of 98.
