= Alibi-ya =

Type of Japanese business

An alibi-ya (アリバイ屋, aribai ya) is a business in Japan that creates an identity viewed as socially respectable for peoples involved in occupations that may be viewed as shameful — typically identities for women involved in the sex industry. The fictitious identity is created to conceal the person's actual identity from her family and potential spouses. Services provided by alibi-ya range from simply a phone answering service at a non-existent employer to arrangements for a boss to give a speech at the client's wedding praising her work at the non-existent company. Though the business is not illegal of itself, alibi-ya came to attention in 2011 when fake documents issued by an alibi-ya were used to illegally obtain bank loans. In subsequent years, these firms provided customers with fake identities, spurious tax certificates, and false documents required to rent apartments or take out personal loans.

== Etymology ==
"Alibi-ya" is a combination of the English world "alibi" and the Japanese "ya", meaning "shop" or "seller". It is also written in Japanese as aribai-gaisha (アリバイ会社), meaning "alibi company".
