= Prostitution Prevention Law =

Statute of Japan

The Prostitution Prevention Law (売春防止法, Baishun bōshi hō) (Law no. 118, May 24, 1956) is a law in Japan that aims to prevent prostitution, punish third parties involved in the trade and to protect and rehabilitate women involved in prostitution. It is also known as the "Anti-Prostitution Law". The law came into force on April 1, 1957, and all provisions were fully effective on April 1 of the following year. As the law does not punish prostitution per se (client and prostitute), it is viewed as a preventive law rather than a prohibition law.

== History ==
Japan has a history of supervised prostitution dating back to the Kamakura period (1185–1333). In 1618, during the Edo period, Yūkaku areas were set up and prostitution regulated. From the late 1880s onwards, various groups, including the Woman's Christian Temperance Union and Purity Society lobbied for the end of legalised prostitution. The Japanese government resisted these demands on the grounds that they provided effective control of STIs and that without them men's sexual desires would lead to increased cases of rape and sex crimes. Under pressure from the abolitionists, in May 1934 the Home Ministry announced that licensed prostitution would be abolished in the near future, but no action was taken.

During the American occupation of Japan following WW2, prostitution boomed. In January 1946 the General Headquarters of the Supreme Commander for the Allied Powers (GHQ/SCAP), issued an order to abolish licensed prostitution. This led to the Businesses Affecting Public Morals Regulation Act being passed in 1948. A bill prohibiting prostitution was put before the Diet (parliament) in 1947 but was defeated.

Female Diet members attempted to introduce various anti-prostitution measures until in May 1956 they succeeded with the Prostitution Prevention Law. Prime Minister Ichirō Hatoyama had established a Council on Prostitution Policy which was chaired by anti-prostitution crusader Tsûsai Sugawara, and the resulting law criminalized solicitation, procurement, and contracts for prostitution, though not the act of prostitution itself. Sugawara admitted that the compromise legislation contained loopholes but at least made it illegal to sell daughters into prostitution, and he suggested that if prostitution could not be eradicated, official regulation may become necessary.

== Main articles ==
The main articles of the legislation are as follows:

- Chapter I General Provisions
  - Article 1: States that: 'Prostitution harms the dignity of the individual, is against sexual virtue and disrupts the proper morals of society'. It defines the purpose of the Act as punishing those who promote prostitution and preventing prostitution by taking measures for guidance, protection and rehabilitation to women who are likely to prostitute themselves.
  - Article 2: Defines prostitution as 'having sexual intercourse with a non-specified person(s) in exchange for compensation or the promise of such'. No punishment is prescribed.
  - Article 3: Prohibits being a counterpart to prostitution (i.e. a prostitute or client) but no punishment is prescribed.
- Chapter 2 Criminal Procedure – The following acts are prohibited:
  - Article 5: Inducing others to purchase sexual services in public (pimping and solicitation).
  - Article 6: Proclamation of prostitution (pimping).
  - Article 7: Coercing others into prostitution.
  - Article 8: Receiving compensation for the coercion of others into prostitution.
  - Article 9: Providing benefits to enable others to provide prostitution services.
  - Article 10: Making a contract for the purpose of providing a prostitution service to others.
  - Article 11: Provision of places in which prostitution may take place (brothels).
  - Article 12: Managing or organizing a place of prostitution.
  - Article 13: Providing funds required for places of prostitution or other prostitution businesses.
- Chapter 3 Dispensation
  - Article 17: A women who commits a crime under Article 5 may be subjected to a guidance action.
- Chapter 4 Protective Rehabilitation
  - Article 34: All prefectures and counties should set up women's guidance homes.
  - Article 36: Women's protection facilities may be set up for the purpose of protection and rehabilitation.

== See also ==
- Convention for the Suppression of the Traffic in Persons and of the Exploitation of the Prostitution of Others
- Akasen
