= Red-light district =

Urban area with a high concentration of sex-related businesses

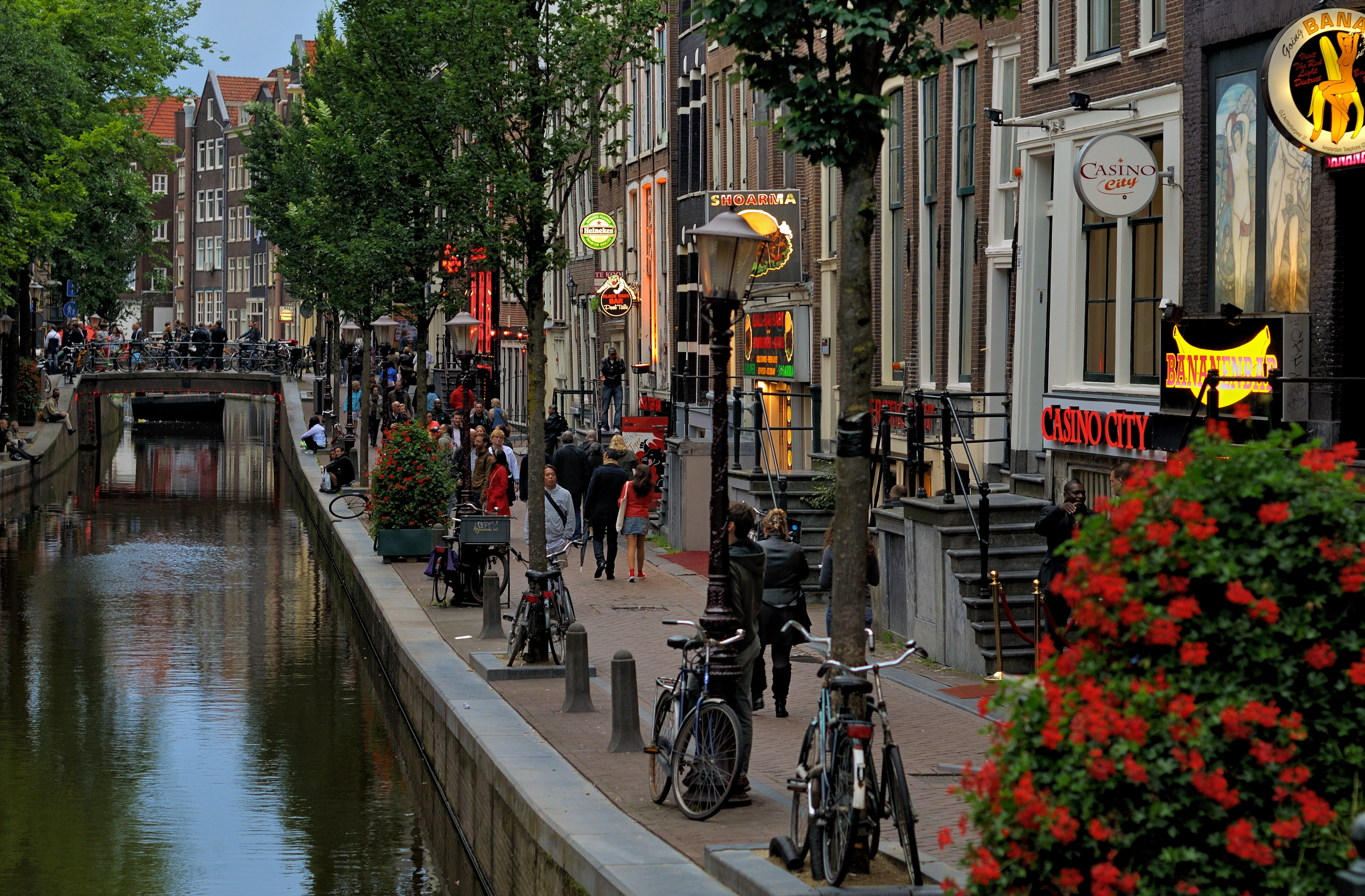
De Wallen, Amsterdam's red-light district, is internationally known and one of the main tourist attractions of the city. It offers legal prostitution and a number of coffee shops that sell marijuana.

A red-light district or pleasure district is a part of an urban area where a concentration of prostitution and sex-oriented businesses, such as sex shops, strip clubs, and adult theaters, is found. In most cases, red-light districts are particularly associated with female street prostitution, though in some cities, these areas may coincide with spaces of male prostitution and gay venues. Areas in many big cities around the world have acquired an international reputation as red-light districts.

== Origins of the term ==
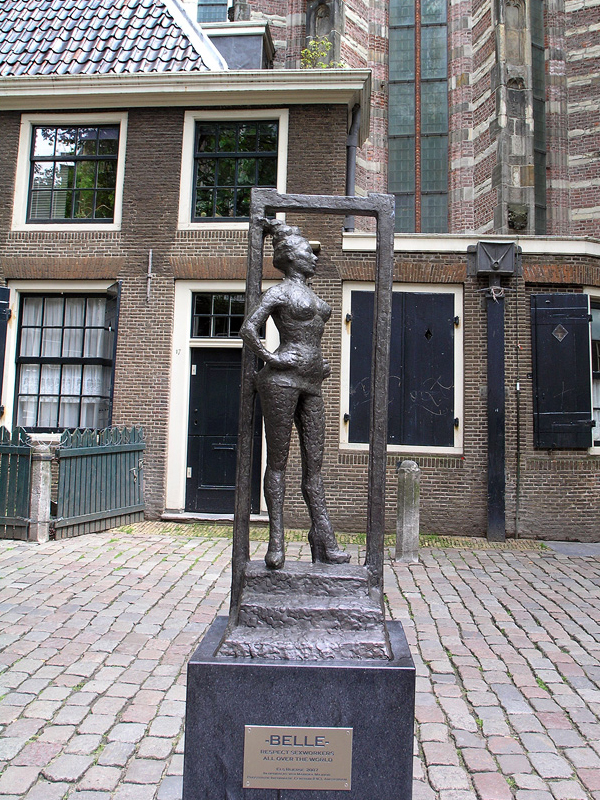
A statue in honor of sex workers in Amsterdam, Netherlands

Red-light districts are mentioned in the 1882 minutes of a Woman's Christian Temperance Union meeting in the United States. The Oxford English Dictionary records the earliest known appearance of the term "red light district" in print as an 1894 article from the Sandusky Register, a newspaper in Sandusky, Ohio. A usage the year prior was in the Cincinnati Enquirer of Cincinnati, Ohio.

Author Paul Wellman suggests that this and other terms associated with the American Old West originated in Dodge City, Kansas, home to a well-known prostitution district during the 19th century, which included the Red Light House saloon. This has not been proven, but the Dodge City use was likely responsible for the term's pervasiveness. A widespread folk etymology claims that early railroad workers took red lanterns with them when they visited brothels so their crew could find them in the event of an emergency. However, folklorist Barbara Mikkelson regards this as unfounded.

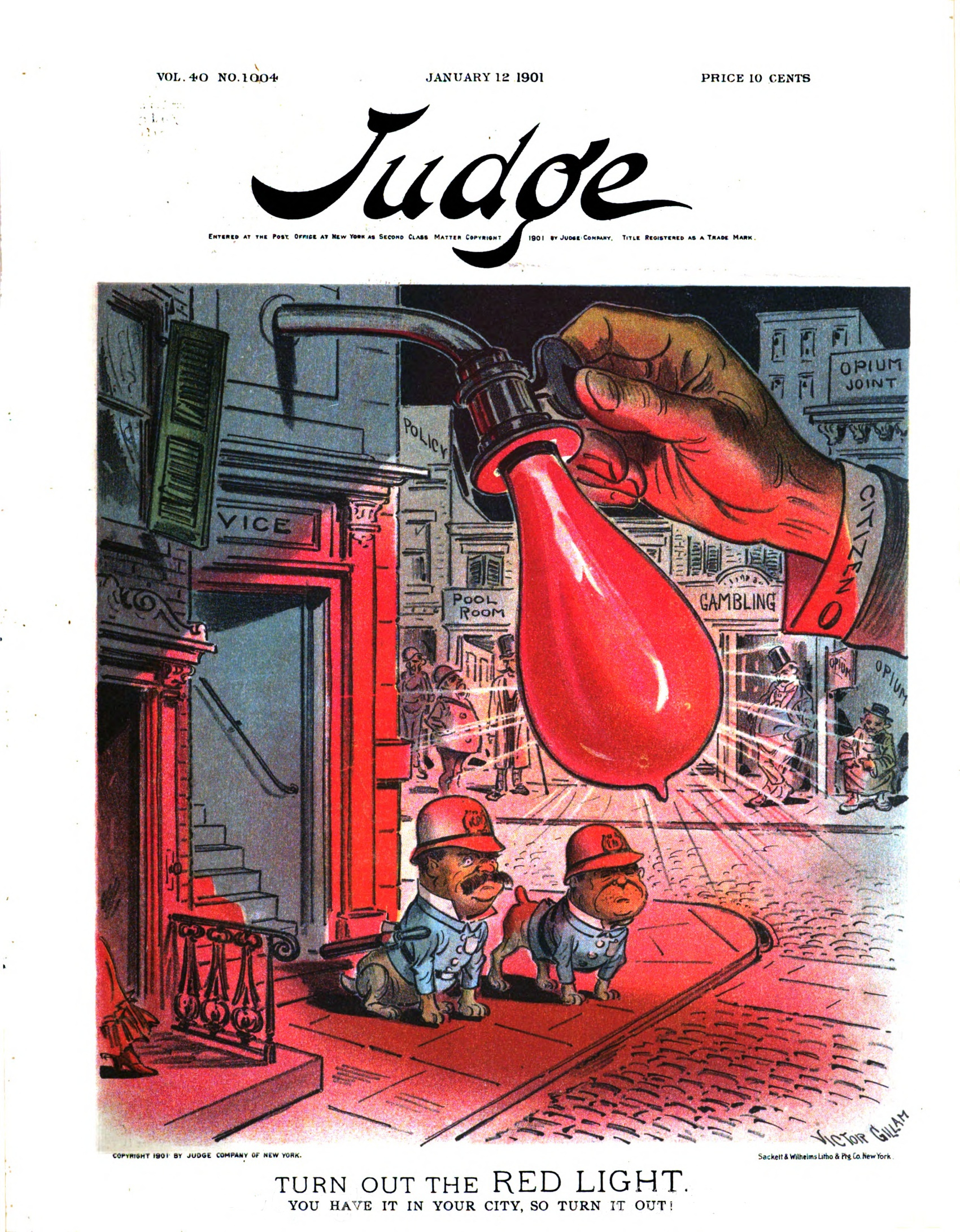
An early reference to red-light districts on a January 1901 Judge cover

A commonly repeated, though likely spurious, folk etymology stems from sailors coming back from sea to Amsterdam (c. 1650): Women working as prostitutes, deprived of proper hygiene and running fresh water, carrying red lanterns — with their color camouflaging boils, zits, inequalities in the face and on the skin — made clear they were available as women of pleasure.

One of the many terms used for a red-light district in Japanese is akasen (赤線), literally meaning "red-line". Japanese police drew a red line on maps to indicate the boundaries of legal red-light districts. In Japanese, the term aosen (青線), literally meaning "blue-line", also exists, indicating an illegal district.

In the United States during the 19th and early 20th centuries, the term "sporting district" became popular for legal red-light districts. Municipal governments typically defined such districts explicitly to contain and regulate prostitution.

== Other uses ==
In World War I (circa 1915), "Brothels displayed blue lamps if they were for officers and red lamps for other ranks."

== Legal issues ==
Some red-light districts (such as De Wallen, Netherlands, or Reeperbahn, Germany) are places that are officially designated by authorities for legal and regulated prostitution. Often, these red-light districts were formed by authorities to help regulate prostitution and other related activities, such that they were confined to a single area.

Some red-light districts (such as those in The Hague) are under video surveillance. This can help counter illegal forms of prostitution (such as child prostitution), in these areas that do allow regular prostitution to occur.

Legality of prostitution Decriminalization - No criminal penalties for prostitution Legalisation – prostitution is legal and regulated Semi-legal – prostitution is legal, but organized activities such as brothels and pimping are illegal; prostitution is not regulated Quasi-legal – illegal to buy sex and for 3rd party involvement, legal to sell sex Prohibitionism – prostitution illegal Legality varies with local laws

== Image gallery ==
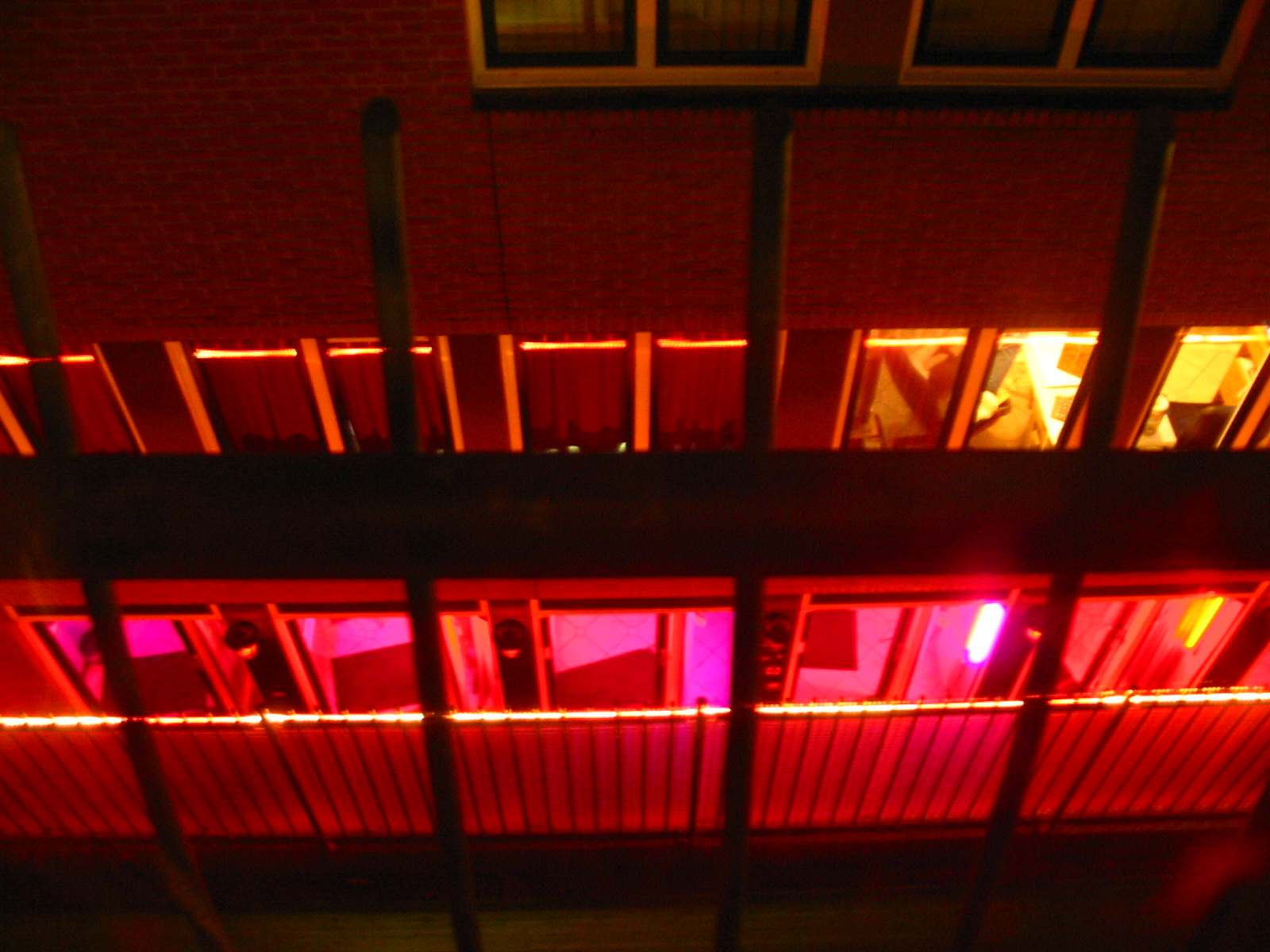
The Red Light District in Amsterdam

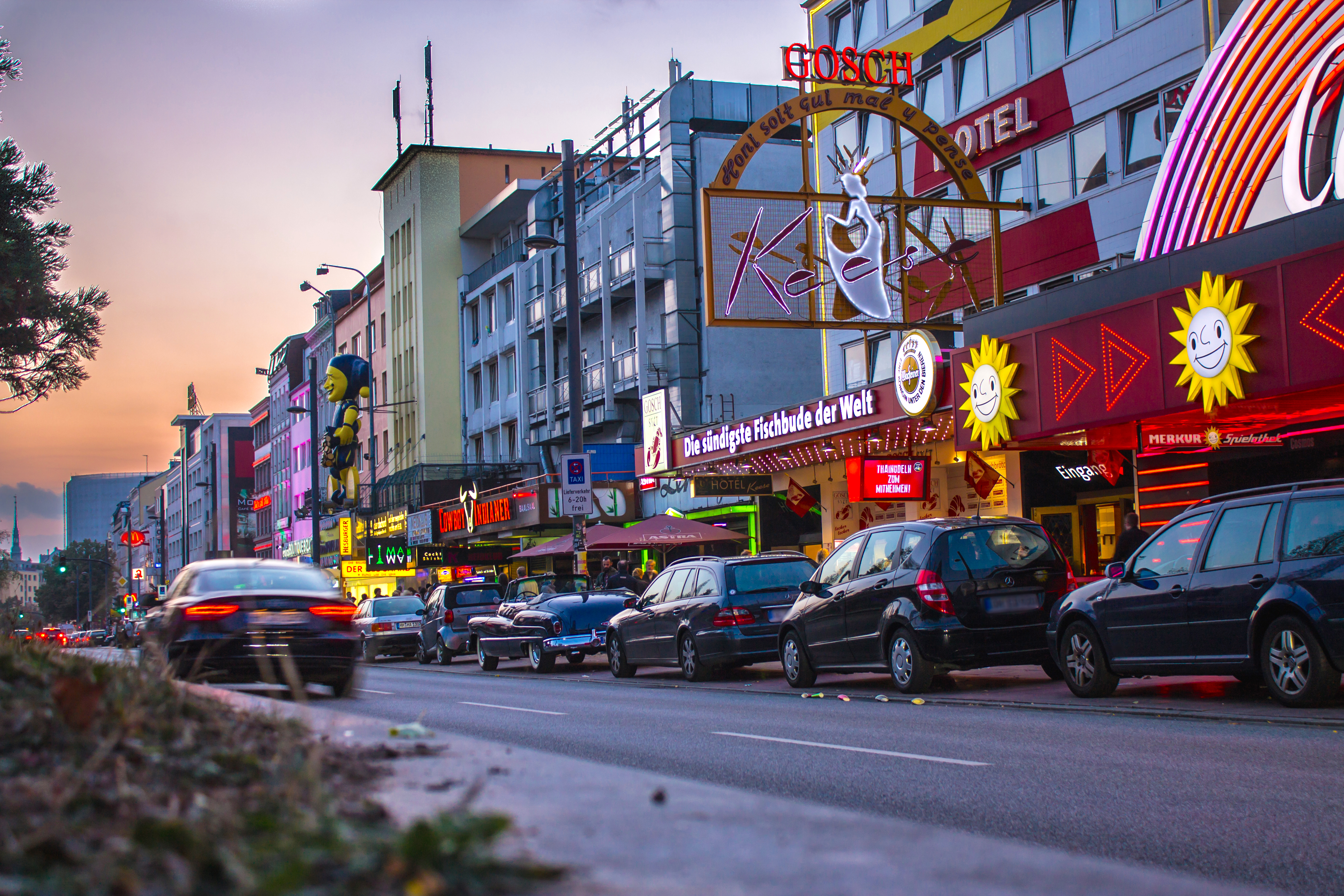
Reeperbahn in Hamburg, Germany

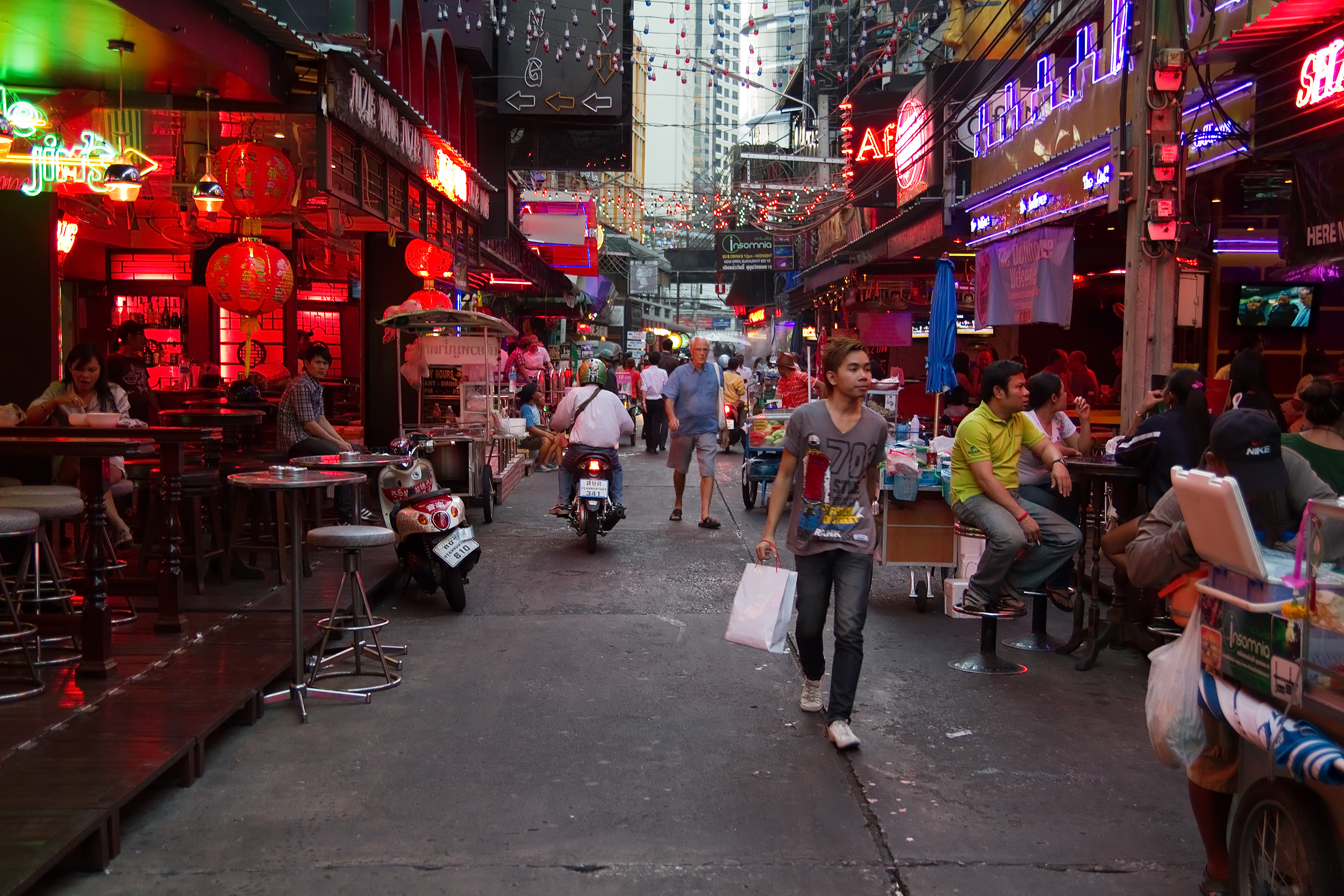
Soi Cowboy, Bangkok, Thailand

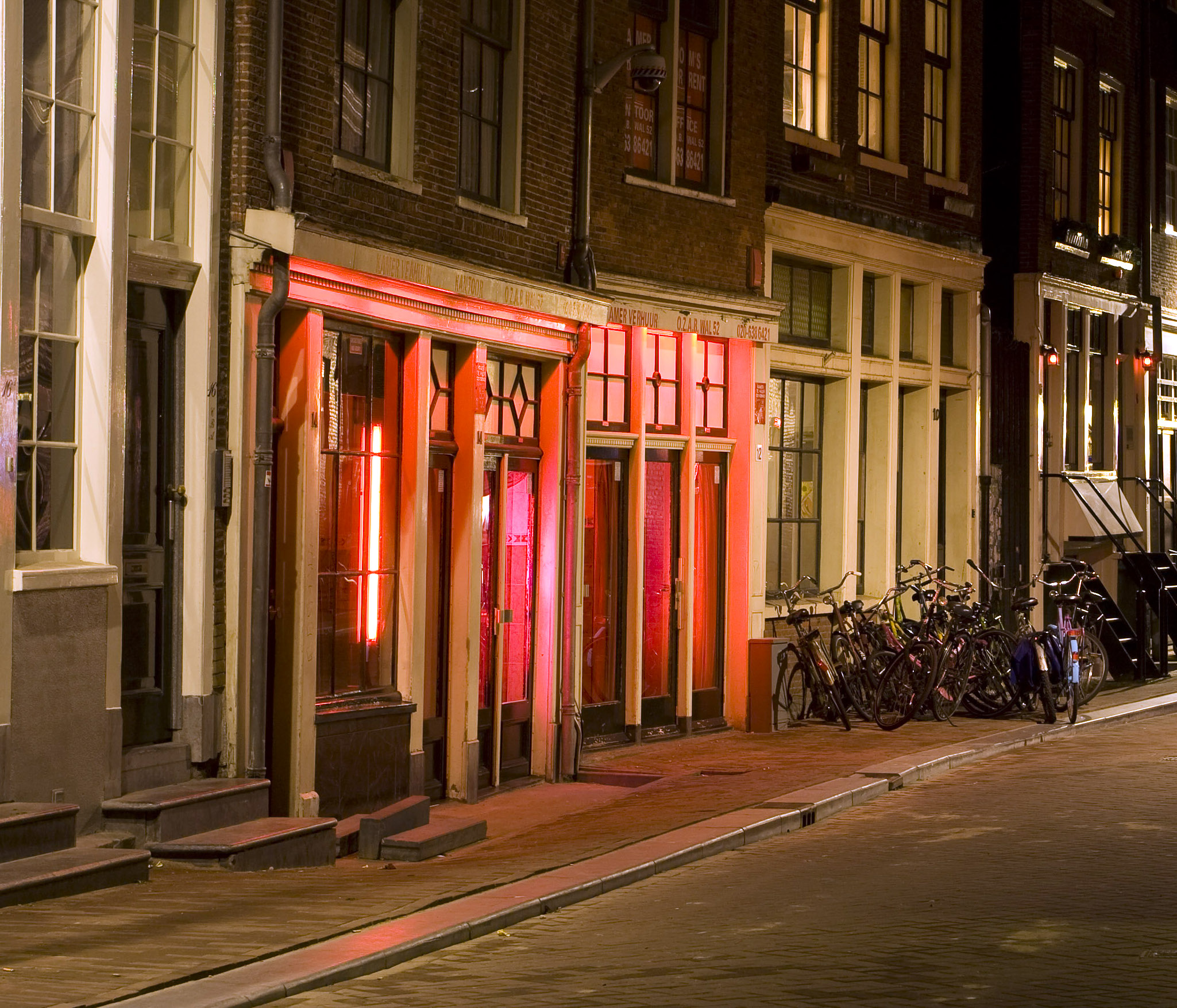
Rooms illuminated by red lights in De Wallen, Amsterdam, Netherlands

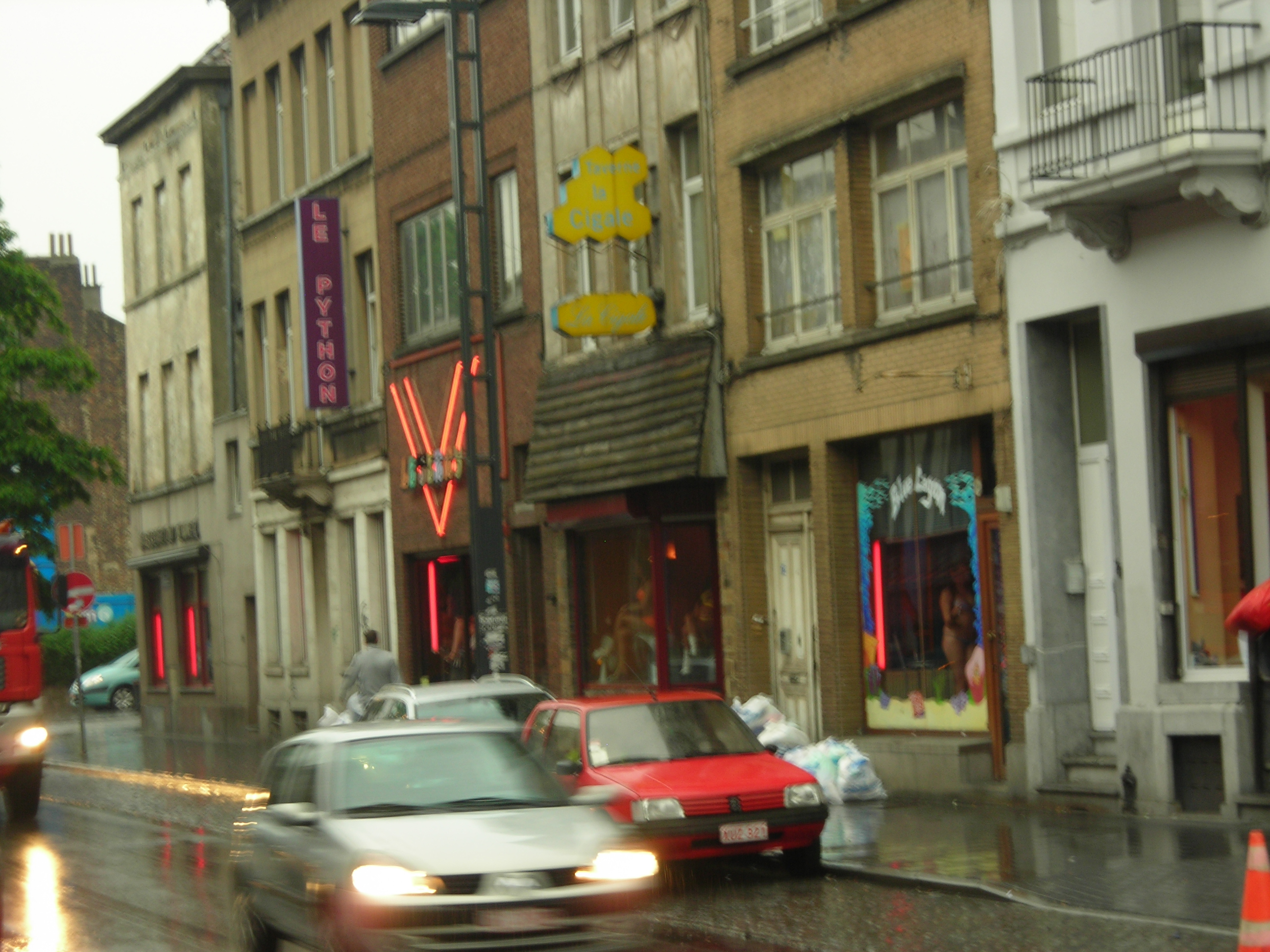
Rue d'Aerschot, Brussels, Belgium

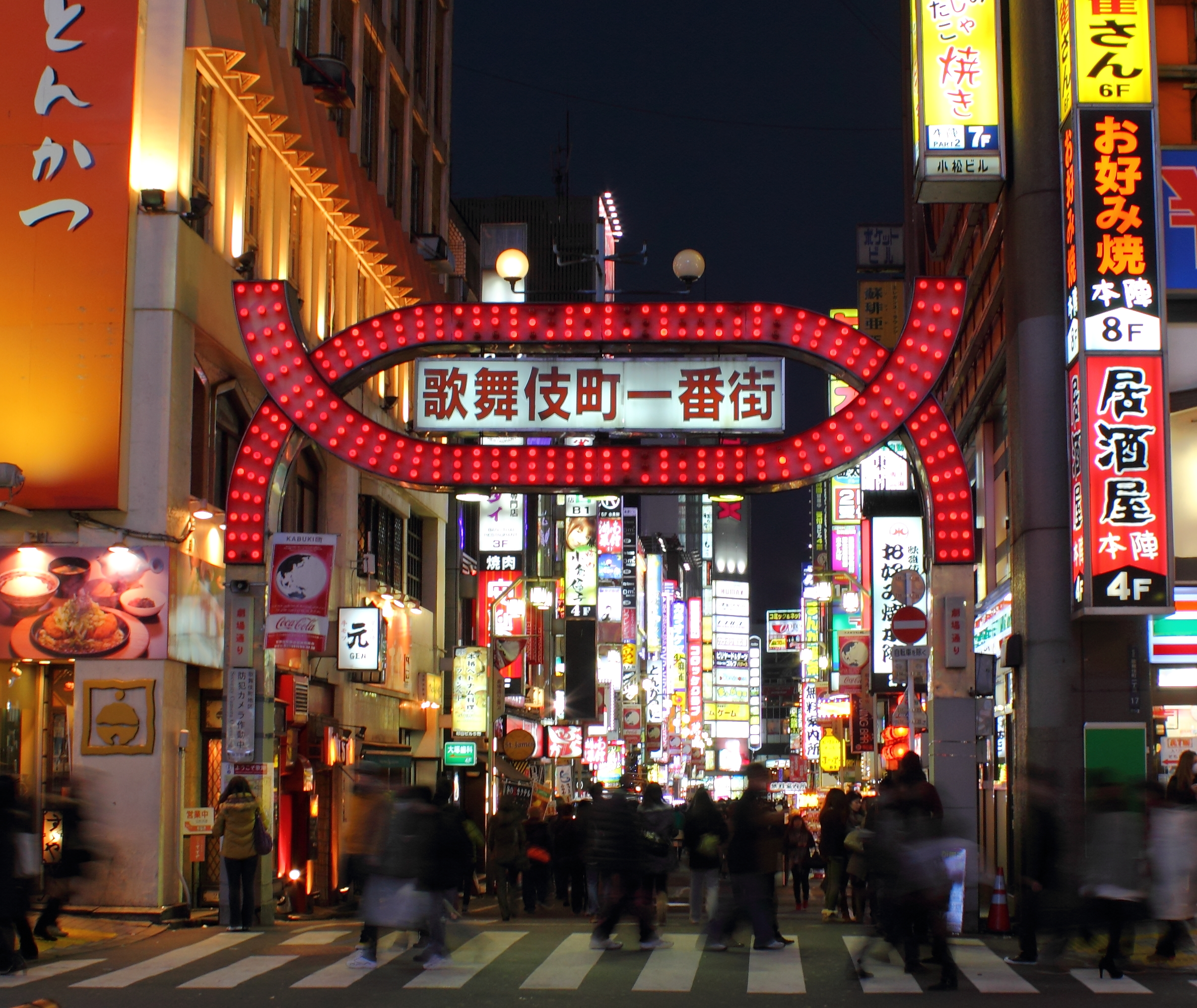
Kabukichō Ichiban-gai gate and colorful neon street signs, Shinjuku, Tokyo, Japan

== See also ==
- List of red-light districts
- Prostitution by region
