= Tavern =

Eatery

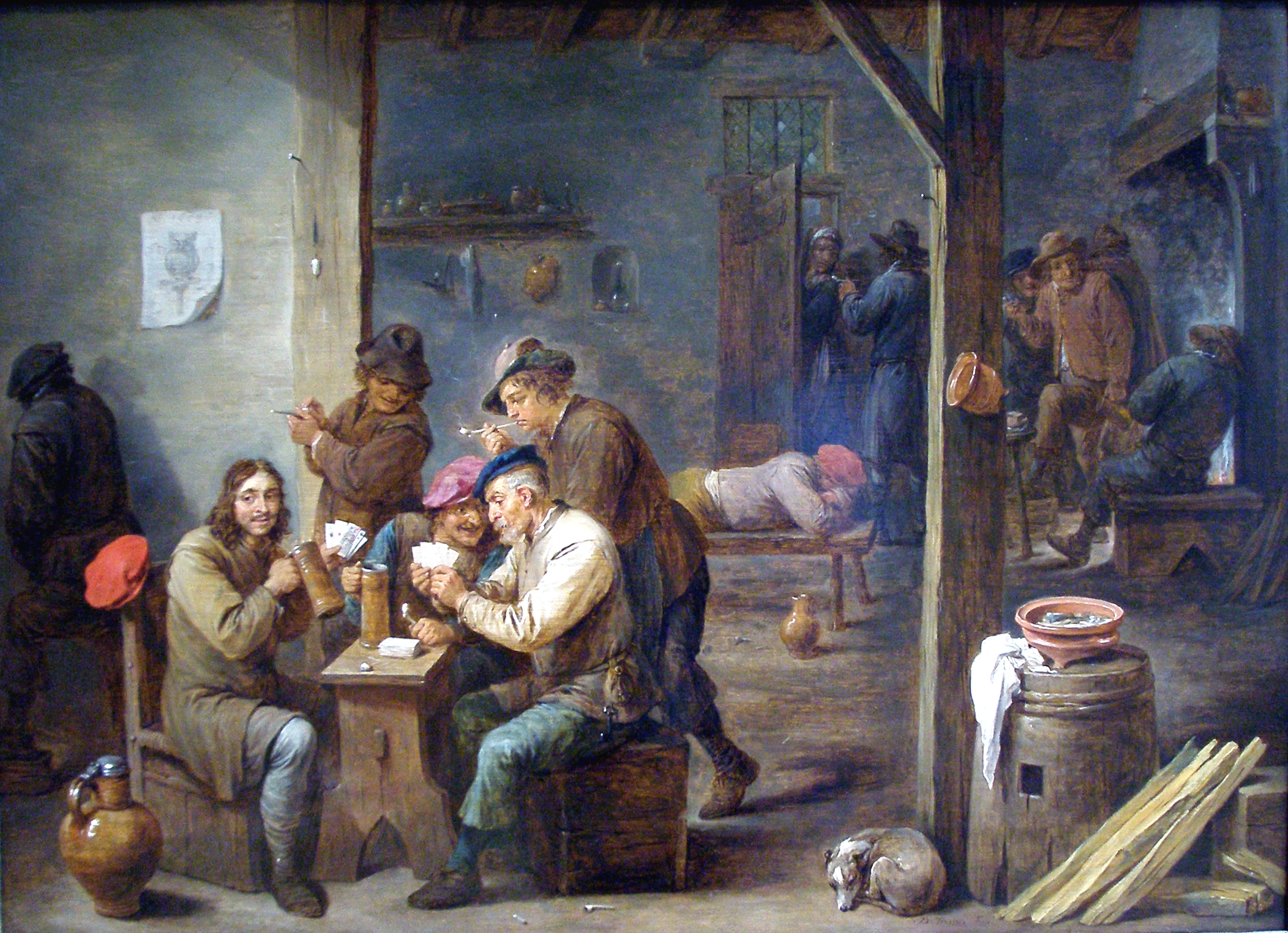
Tavern Scene by Flemish artist David Teniers, c. 1658

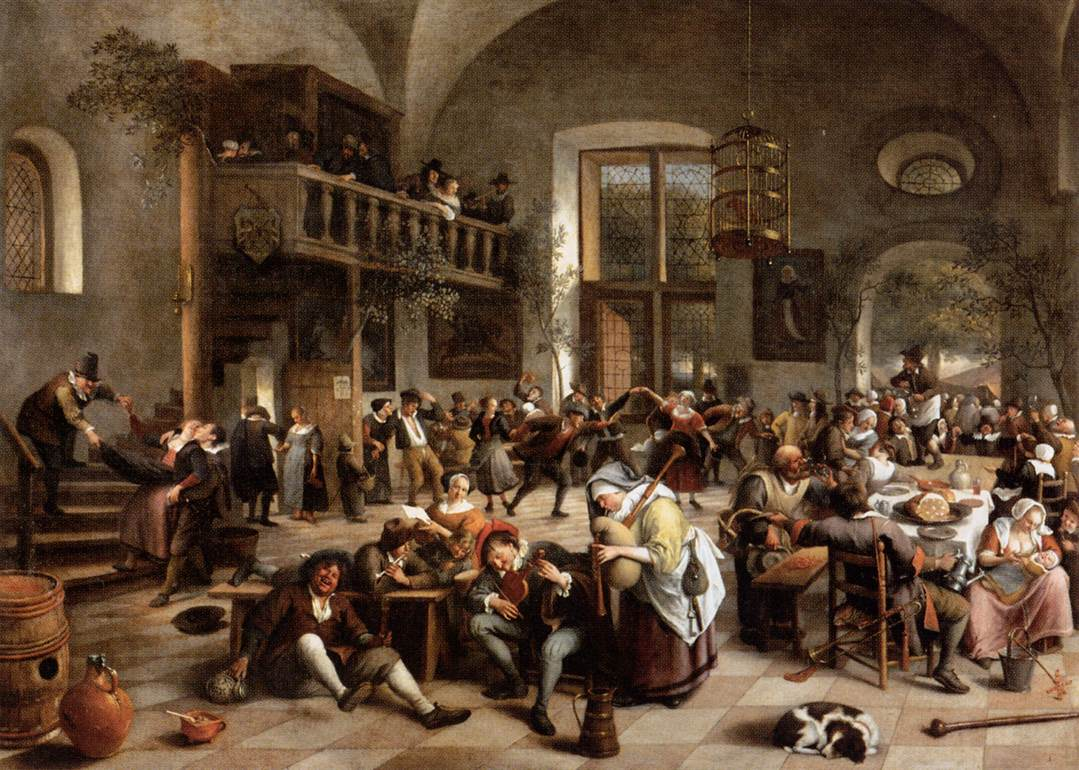
A Dutch tavern scene by Jan Steen, late 17th century

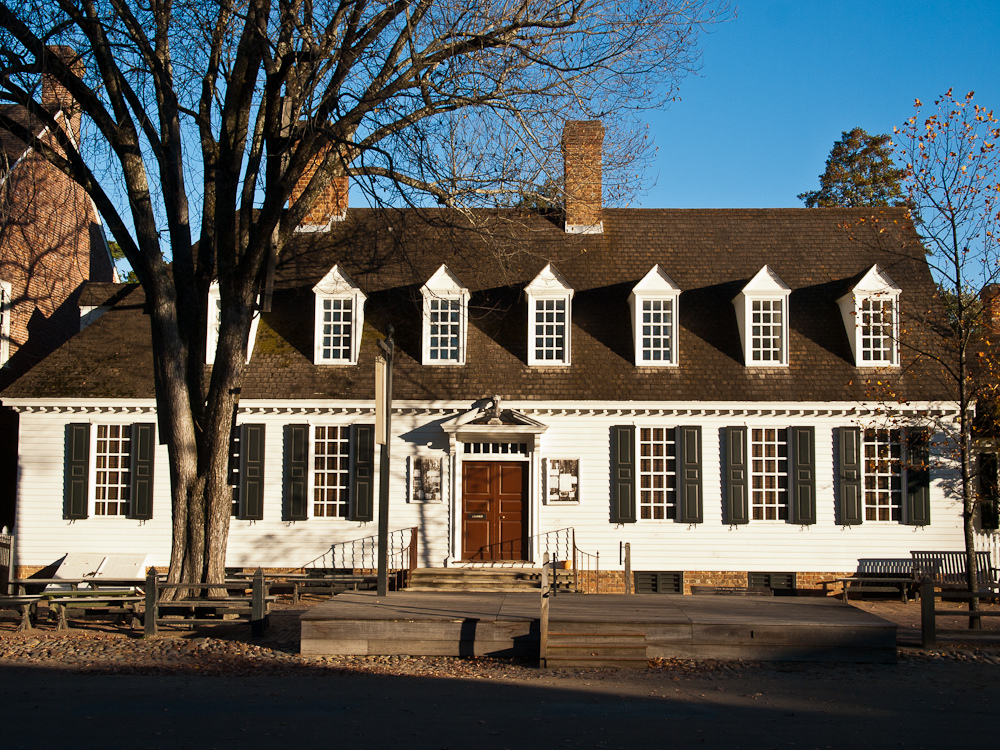
Raleigh Tavern, Colonial Williamsburg, Williamsburg, Virginia

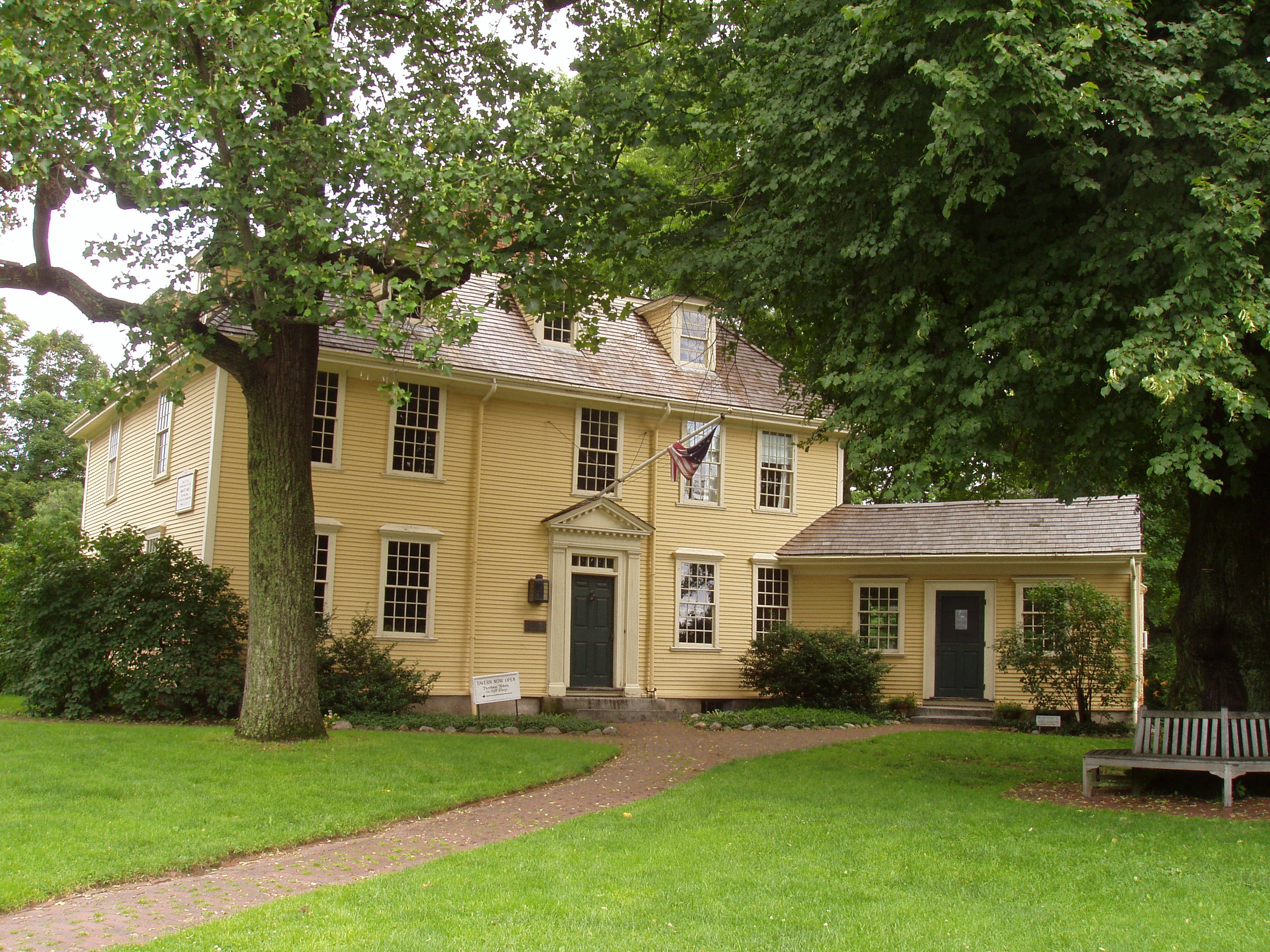
Buckman Tavern, where the first shots of the American Revolution were fired, Lexington, Massachusetts

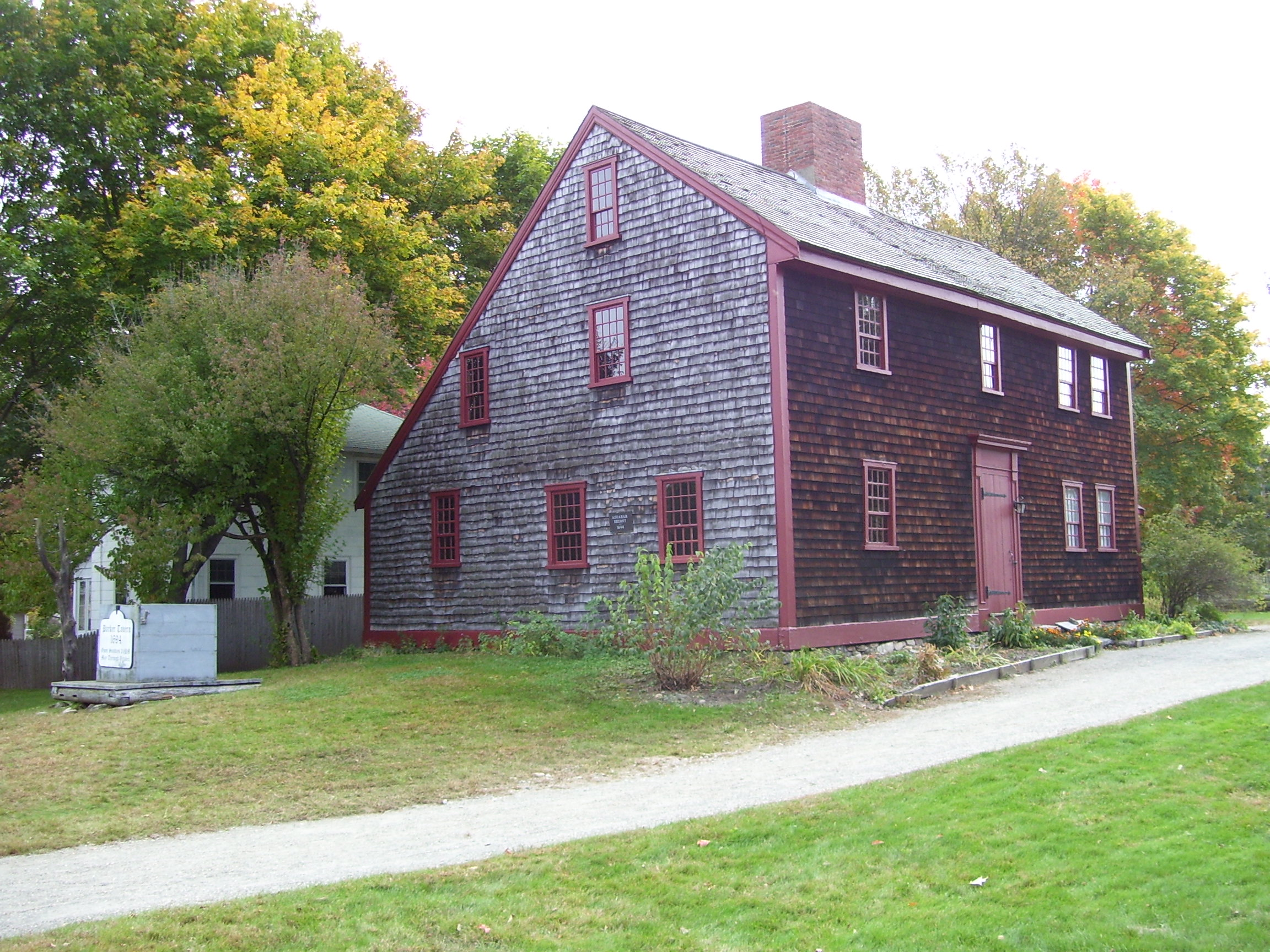
Parker Tavern, Reading, Massachusetts showing traditional New England saltbox architecture

A tavern is a type of business where people gather to drink alcoholic beverages and be served food, such as different types of roast meats and cheese, and (mostly historically) where travelers would receive lodging. An inn is a tavern that has a licence to put up guests as lodgers. The word derives from the Latin taberna whose original meaning was a shed, workshop, stall, or pub.

Over time, the words "tavern" and "inn" became interchangeable and synonymous. In England, inns started to be referred to as public houses or pubs and the term became standard for all drinking houses.

== Europe ==
=== France ===
From at least the 14th century, taverns, along with inns, were the main places to dine out. Typically, a tavern offered various roast meats, as well as simple foods like bread, cheese, herring, and bacon. Some offered a wider variety of foods, though it would be cabarets and later traiteurs which offered the finest meals before the restaurant appeared in the 18th century. Their stated purpose, however, was to serve wine (not beer or cider, which had other outlets) and they were so disreputable that women of any standing avoided them.

After 1500, taxes on wine and other alcoholic beverages grew increasingly more burdensome, not only because of the continual increase in the level of taxation but also because of the bewildering variety and multiplicity of the taxes. This chaotic system was enforced by an army of tax collectors. The resultant opposition took many forms. Wine growers and tavern keepers concealed wine and falsified their methods of selling it to take advantage of lower tax rates. The retailers also refilled their casks secretly from hidden stocks. Wine merchants stealthily circumvented inspection stations to avoid local import duties. When apprehended, some defrauders reacted with passive resignation, while others resorted to violence. Situated at the heart of the country town or village, the tavern was one of the traditional centers of social and political life before 1789, a meeting place for both the local population and travelers passing through and a refuge for rogues and scoundrels. Taverns symbolized opposition to the regime and to religion.

Taverns sometimes served as restaurants. In Paris, the first restaurant in the modern sense of the term was founded in 1765. However, the first Parisian restaurant worthy of the name was the one founded by Beauvilliers in 1782 in the Rue de Richelieu, called the Grande Taverne de Londres.

Émile Zola's novel L'Assommoir ('The Tavern', 1877) depicted the social conditions typical of alcoholism in Paris among the working classes. The drunk destroyed not only his own body, but also his employment, his family, and other interpersonal relationships. The characters Gervaise Macquart and her husband Coupeau exemplified with great realism the physical and moral degradation of alcoholics. Zola's correspondence with physicians reveals that he used authentic medical sources for his realistic depictions in the novel.

=== Germany ===
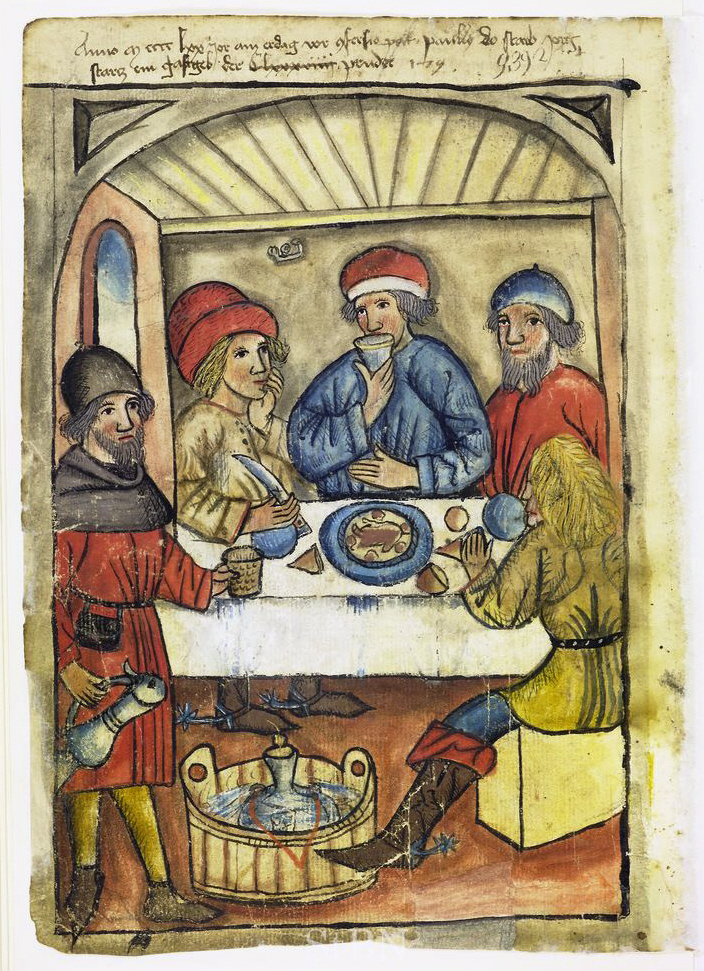
German tavern circa 1470

A common German name for German taverns or pubs is Kneipe. Drinking practices in 16th-century Augsburg, Germany, suggest that the use of alcohol in early modern Germany followed carefully structured cultural norms. Drinking was not a sign of insecurity and disorder. It helped define and enhance men's social status and was therefore tolerated among men as long as they lived up to both the rules and norms of tavern society and the demands of their role as householders. Tavern doors were closed to respectable women unaccompanied by their husbands, and society condemned drunkenness among women, but when alcohol abuse interfered with the household, women could deploy public power to impose limits on men's drinking behaviour.

=== United Kingdom ===
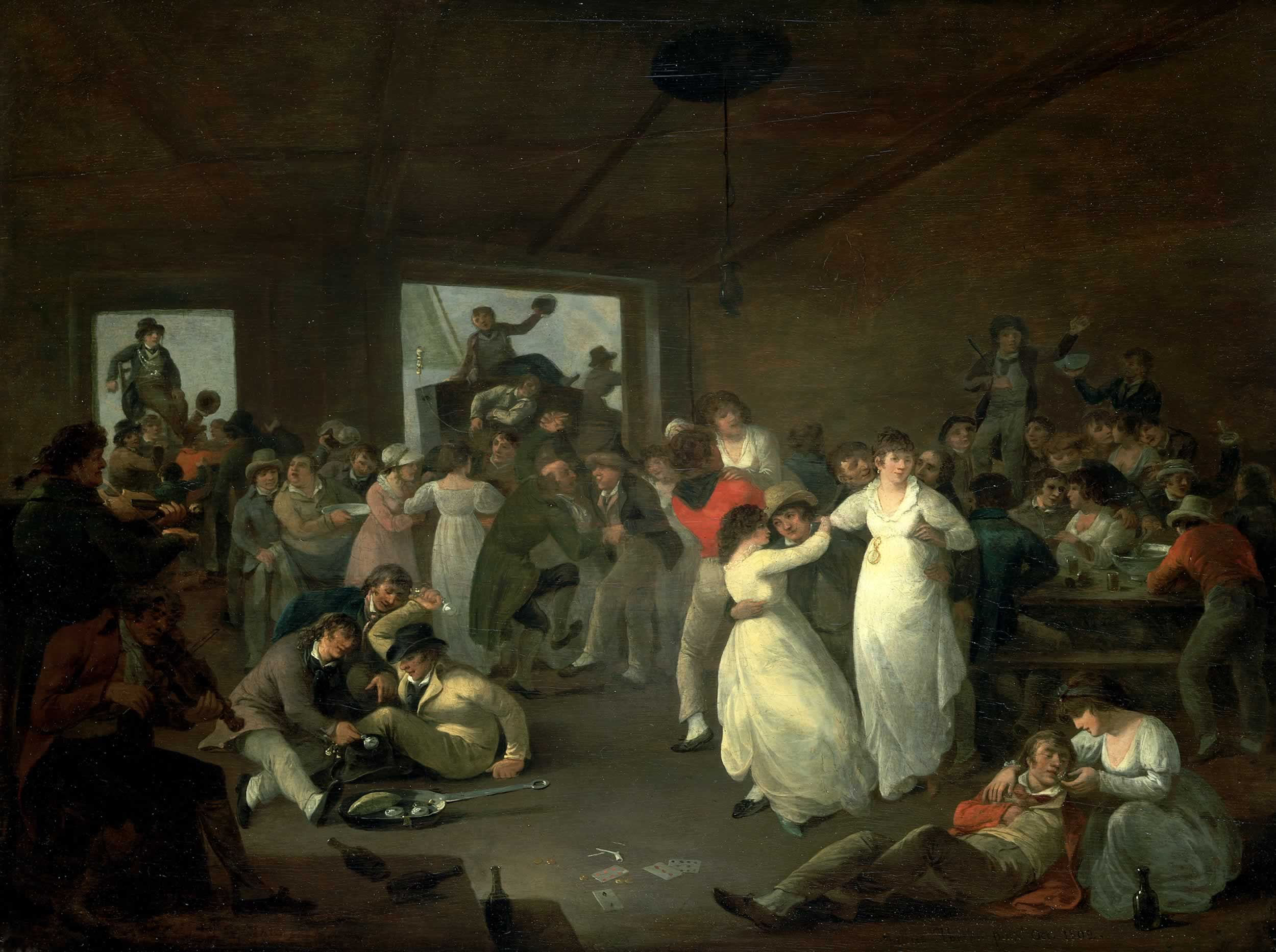
A scene in an unspecified tavern at Portsmouth after one or more ships have been paid off

The term "tavern" occurs in English from the 13th century onwards. From the 16th century, taverns or inns known as "ordinaries" served fixed-price meals in England.

Taverns were popular places used for commercial transactions as well as for eating and drinking – the London Tavern became a notable meeting-place in the 18th and 19th centuries, for example. However, the word "tavern" has declined in popular use in the UK as there is no distinction between a tavern and an inn. Both establishments serve wine and beer/ale. The term "pub" (an abbreviation of "public house") now applies to these houses. The legacy of taverns and inns remains in pub names, e.g. Fitzroy Tavern, Silver Cross Tavern, Spaniards Inn, etc. The word also survives in songs such as "There is a Tavern in the Town".

The range and quality of pubs varies wildly throughout the UK as does the range of beers, wines, spirits and foods available. Most quality pubs will still serve cask ales and food. Since c. 1991 there has been a move towards "gastro" pubs, which have more ambitious menus. Originally, taverns served as rest-stops about every fifteen miles apart, and their main focus was to provide shelter to anyone who was traveling. Such taverns would be divided into two major parts – the sleeping quarters and the bar. There is generally a sign with some type of symbol, often related to the name of the premises, to draw in customers. The sign indicates that the establishment sells alcohol and sets it apart from the competition.

The idea of taverns in early modern England can be traced back to Ancient Rome. Roman roads built in England would often lead to the equivalent of a tavern in their day. In Latin, it was known as a tabernae.

==== Elites ====
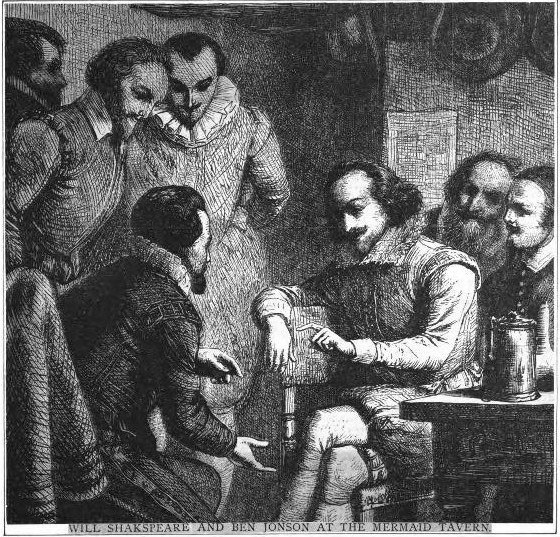
Shakespeare portrayed at the Mermaid Tavern in London.

Taverns would often serve the upper class of English society. In imagery depicting the events of a tavern, men of important garments can frequently be seen. Places like universities, such as Oxford, would also likely have varying taverns around them. This was done in an effort to attract a higher clientele.

Taverns would often serve wine, as it was viewed as being of a higher quality. Alehouses would typically serve beer, as it was viewed as cheap and of lesser quality. There were exceptions to this. Many important playwrights of the day preferred beer to wine, and such it would be served as a way to attract them to the tavern.

==== Women ====
The role of women in taverns differs depending on where you are looking at. In England, most taverns were run by men. In the English colonies, women were often in charge of running the tavern. The licenses for taverns must be acquired by men, but their wife or daughter would operate the establishment.

==== The Mermaid Tavern ====
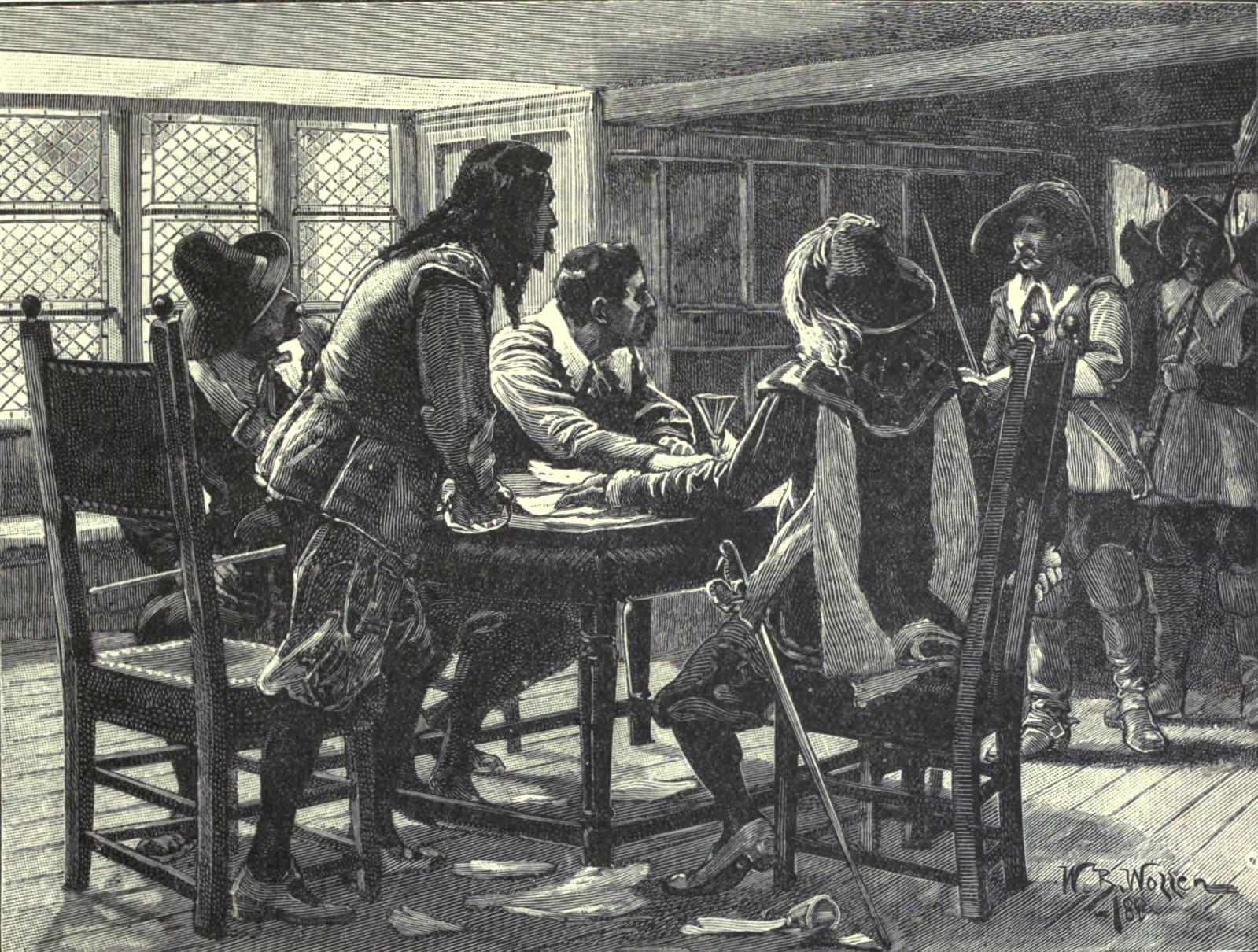
Events depicted inside the Mermaid Tavern in London.

The Mermaid Tavern was one of the most notable taverns in Early Modern England. Its location near St. Paul’s Cathedral made it notable, along with the likely myth that William Shakespeare was a frequent patron. It was later destroyed in the Great Fire of 1666.

One of the surviving remnants of the tavern comes in the form of a coin. Two tokens remain from the Mermaid Tavern. These tokens were used as an early form of bar tabs in the 17th century. One could exchange money for the tokens when you first enter the establishment, then pay with the tokens as you want more drinks throughout the evening.

==== The Boar's Head Inn ====
The Boar’s Head Inn is a tavern depicted in Shakespeare’s play, Henry IV, Part I. This inn was likely established after the time of King Henry IV, but was present during Shakespeare’s time. It would later be destroyed by the Great Fire of 1666. It would be rebuilt, only to be taken down again in 1831. The sign to the inn remains and is located outside of the Globe Theatre.

==== The Role of Government ====
The English government was not afraid to step in the realm of alcohol distribution. They would frequently assess the quality of ale being provided by an establishment, and in doing so would impose a fine if it was not judged to be up to par. Laws and regulations would be updated every few years in an effort to both increase taxes and the safety of the public. At the time, it was common opinion that places that sold alcohol were a threat to society.

As demand for alcoholic beverages increased, so did the need for supply. Ingredients could be outsourced from the English colonies that were beneficial in making ale. Coffee was also on the rise at this time, and so coffeehouses rose in popularity. For the elites, coffee was often judged as a drink for the lower class, and they would stick with drinking wine more often than not.

=== Scandinavia ===
Scandinavia had very high drinking rates, which led to the formation of a powerful prohibition movement in the 19th century. Magnusson (1986) explains why consumption of spirits was so high in a typical preindustrial village (Eskilstuna) in Sweden, 1820–50. An economic feature of this town of blacksmiths was the Verlag, or outwork production system, with its complex network of credit relationships. The tavern played a crucial role in cultural and business life and was also the place where work and leisure were fused. Heavy drinking facilitated the creation of community relationships in which artisans and workers sought security. Buying drinks rather than saving money was a rational strategy when, before adjustment to a cash economy, it was essential to raise one's esteem with fellow craftsmen to whom one could turn for favors in preference to the Verlag capitalist.

=== Greece ===
A restaurant in Greece is commonly known as a taverna. Their history begins in Classical times, with the earliest evidence of a taverna discovered at the Ancient Agora of Athens; the style remains the same to this day. Greek tavernes (plural of taverna) are the most common restaurants in Greece. A typical menu includes portion dishes, or small dishes of meat and fish, as well as salads and appetizers. Mageirefta is the menu section that includes a variety of different casserole cooked dishes every day. The other choices are mainly prepared roasted (tis oras) or fried. Orektika (appetizers) include small dishes of Greek sauces, alifes, usually eaten on bites of bread. Tavernes offer different kinds of wines and retsina in barrels or in bottles, ouzo or tsipouro, with beer and refreshments being a recent addition. In Byzantine times, tavernes were the place for a social gathering, to enjoy a meal, live music and friendly talk with a drink accompanied by small variety dishes (mezes).

=== Former Yugoslavia ===
In former Yugoslavia, the kafana serves food and alcoholic beverages.

=== Czech Republic and Slovakia ===
The most frequent Czech translation of tavern or pub is "hospoda". It comes out from hospodář (landlord) and is also close to hostitel (host), host (guest) and hostina (dinner, banquet). And also to Russian gospodin (master, lord, sir) and, not to forget, to hospitality. Traditionally, "hospoda" or "hostinec" were full-fledged facilities, providing lodging, meals and drink, an inn. In modern times, the meaning of the word has a bit narrowed. Nevertheless, it is used colloquially to denote both traditional restaurants where people go to eat, and bars, where people mainly go to drink and socialize. "Hospoda" is nowadays a very widespread but only colloquial word, while "hostinec" or "pohostinství" were often official names of such establishment in the 20th century, now a bit obsolete. "Hospoda" could be with meals served or without, typically with tapped beer. (This term is not used for wine bars.) As drinking beer is an important part of the Czech culture, inviting to "hospoda" generally means: "let's go and have a drink together, let's meet, chat, and socialize…". It is often equipped with a TV, billiards table, darts etc. Pubs serve both local regulars as well as excursionists, tourists and other guests.

Establishments specialized primarily in the consumption of beer (beer bars) are called "výčep" ("výčap" in Slovak), expressively "nálevna", or "pajzl" (from German Baisel, originally from Jidish). "Knajpa" (from German) is an expressive word, and "krčma" is rather archaic in Czech. The word "taverna" (from Italian) is understood as a foreign term for establishment from South-European cultures, especially Greek or Italian.

In Moravia, especially South Moravia, this social role is rather fulfilled by "wine cellars".

Slovak language prefers the word "krčma" as a neutral colloquial term for pubs and restaurants. It is an old panslavic word.

== Asia ==
=== India ===
The city, Mughalsarai meant Mughal Tavern. It was said to be a tavern on the Grand Trunk Road.

=== Iraq ===
One of the earliest references to a tavern is found in the Code of Hammurabi.

== See also ==
- Bar (establishment)
- Coaching inn
- Izakaya
- List of bars
- List of public house topics
- Prohibition
- Prohibition in the United States
- Pub (public house)
- Roadhouse (premises)
- Taverna
- Tavern clock
- Woman's Christian Temperance Union

== Bibliography ==
- Blocker, Jack S. (ed.) Alcohol and Temperance in Modern History: An International Encyclopedia (2 vol 2003)
- Cherrington, Ernest, (ed.) Standard Encyclopaedia of the Alcohol Problem 6 volumes (1925–1930), comprehensive international coverage to late 1920s
- Gately, Iain Drink: A Cultural History of Alcohol (2008). ISBN 978-1-592-40464-3.
- Heath, Dwight B. (1995). International Handbook on Alcohol and Culture. Archived from the original on 2010-01-26 – via Questia. 27 countries in late 20th century.
- Phillips, Rod. Alcohol: A History (U. of North Carolina Press, 2014)

=== Europe ===
- Bennett, Judith M. Ale, Beer, and Brewsters in England: Women's Work in a Changing World, 1300-1600 (Oxford University Press, 1996)
- Brennan, Thomas. Public Drinking and Popular Culture in Eighteenth Century Paris (1988),
- Clark, Peter. The English Alehouse: A Social History, 1200–1800 (1983).
- Unger, Richard W. Beer in the Middle Ages and the Renaissance (U of Pennsylvania Press, 2004)
- Yeomans, Henry. Alcohol and moral regulation: Public attitudes, spirited measures and Victorian hangovers (Bristol University Press, 2014) online
