= Prostitution in Austria =

Prostitution in Austria is legal and regulated.

== History ==
Over the Middle Ages there existed an uneasy association between those selling sex (usually women) on the one side, and church and state on the other. While the practice was frowned on, it thrived, and was tolerated. The Habsburg Rudolph I of Habsburg (1273–1291) made it an offence to insult these "gelüstigen Frauen" in 1276. After all they paid their taxes (two pfennigs a week). On the other hand, on Sundays and during Lent, they were obliged to stay away from the towns.

The first recorded mention of the existence of brothels (Freudenhäusern) in Vienna can be found in a charter of Duke Albrecht III (1365–1379). Some councilors wanted to set up a charitable foundation for prostitutes who renounced their sinful life. However very soon councilors were actually establishing brothels and even supported a nunnery from the taxes.

The last time prostitution was completely forbidden in Austria was under Maria Theresa of Austria (1740–1780) who shipped prostitutes along with other "antisocial" people down the Danube to Timișoara in the Banat region of Romania.

However, since this did little to reduce prostitution, Austrian laws changed to consider prostitution as a necessary evil that had to be tolerated but regulated by the state. In 1850, Dr. Nusser of the Vienna police suggested that prostitutes be required to register with the police, receive medical examinations twice a week, and obtain special health certificates. In 1873, Anton Ritter von Le Monnier, head of the Vienna police, reformed Vienna's prostitution law, and health certificates have been obligatory since that time. Prostitutes who complied with the requirements of registration and examinations were no longer prosecuted by the police (regulation system). A newspaper article of 27 October 1874 reported that 6,424 prostitutes had received health certificates and were under observation by police and health authorities. According to police estimates, at least 12,000 more women lived on the proceeds of "free love" without being registered. Most of these were factory workers who received so little pay that they needed the additional income. Of the registered prostitutes, 5,312 were unmarried, 902 widows, and 210 married. The youngest was 15 and the oldest 47 years old.

Homosexual male prostitution was legalized in 1989. under paragraph § 210 of the penal code (Strafgesetzbuch). A major reason for legalization was to reduce the spread of HIV through regular medical examinations.

Durch das Bundesgesetz BGBI. Nr. 243/1989 wurde der § 210 StGB, der bislang die gewerbsmäßige gleichgeschlechtliche Unzucht mit einer Person männlichen Geschlechts unter Strafe stellte, aufgehoben. Diese gesetzliche Maßnahme ist das Ergebnis einer ausführlichen Diskussion, in der die Befürworter hauptsächlich dahingehend argumentierten, dass die im Zusammenhang mit der Verbreitung von AIDS getroffenen Gegenmaßnahmen, insbesondere die Durchführung regelmäßiger Untersuchungen sowie die behördliche Registrierung aller Prostituierten, durch die allgemeine Strafbarkeit der männlichen homosexuellen Prostitution in ihrer Effizienz stark beeinträchtigt würden.

== Current laws ==
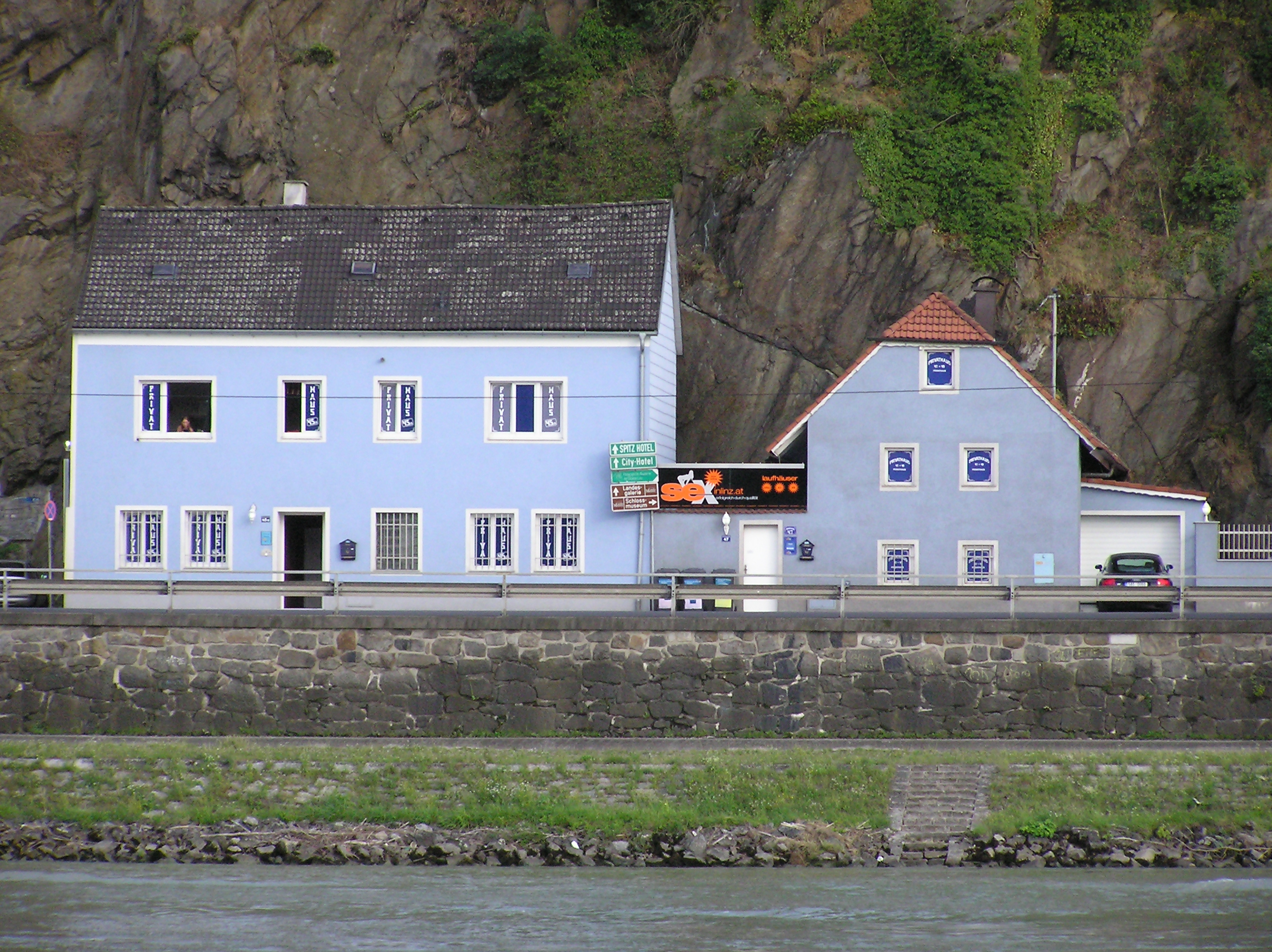
A brothel in Linz

Prostitution in Austria is regulated under the penal code (Strafgesetzbuch), under Zehnter Abschnitt Strafbare Handlungen gegen die sexuelle Integrität und Selbstbestimmung (§§ 201-220b) (Part Ten: Offences against sexual integrity and self-determination (§ § 201-220b)).

Although sex work itself is not forbidden, Section 207b. Sexueller Missbrauch von Jugendlichen (Sexual abuse of juveniles) allows for prosecution of clients of workers younger than 18. Additional restrictions are specified in § 214 to 217. Medical examinations are required by the AIDS and STD laws. The laws of the federal States of Austria place further restrictions on the times and places where prostitution may occur. The most restrictive law is that of Vorarlberg, where prostitution is legal only in licensed brothels and to date no such licenses have been issued.

The Supreme Court of Austria (Oberster Gerichtshof) held in 1989 that Prostitution was a sittenwidriger Vertrag (Unconscionable contract); therefore, a prostitute had no legal recourse against a customer who refuses to pay. In 2012 the Court ruled differently, explaining that prostitution can no longer generally be considered as unconscionable because moral attitudes have changed and prostitution is regulated by local laws. In particular, prostitutes now have the legal right to sue for payment.

Under Strafgesetzbuch § 216, it is forbidden to receive a regular income from the prostitution of another person, so a prostitute cannot legally be considered an employee.

Prostitutes are considered to be self-employed, and since 1986 they have been required to pay taxes. The Arbeits- und Sozialrechts-Änderungsgesetz (ASRÄG) 1997 included them in social insurance.

== Current situation ==
Number of registered prostitutes in Vienna
| Year | Female | Male |
|---|---|---|
| 1874 | 6,424 | |
| 1913 | 1,879 | |
| 1920 | 1,387 | |
| 1993 | 711 | |
| 2003 | 460 | 14 |
| 2004 | 625 | |
| 2006 | 1,132 | 18 |
| April 2007 | 1,352 | 21 |
| November 2008 | 1.728 | |
| 2011 | 2.500 | |
| 2012 | 2.758 | |
| 2013 | 3.300 | |
| End 2013 | 3.390 | 67 |

Origin of registered Austrian prostitutes
| Country | Percentage 2011 | Percentage 2013 |
|---|---|---|
| Romania | 29% | 38% |
| Hungary | 25% | 26% |
| Bulgaria | 15% | 10% |
| Slovakia | 8% | 6% |
| Nigeria | 7% | |
| Czech Republic | 6% | 4% |
| China | | 3% |
| Austria | 4% | 3% |
| Other | 6% | |

Austrian cities do not have red-light districts like the Bahnhofsviertel (Frankfurt am Main), the Reeperbahn in Hamburg, or the De Wallen in Amsterdam; the sex industry is widely distributed over the cities and its presence often goes unnoticed.

In April 2007, 1,352 female and 21 male prostitutes were officially registered in Vienna. In 2003, the oldest prostitute was a 71-year-old Austrian woman, who offered her service in the second district of Vienna, the so-called Leopoldstadt. The number of women working legally and illegally at least from time to time as prostitutes is estimated between 3,500 and 6,000; it is estimated that they totally serve 15,000 clients per day. A similar relation of prostitutes to population number can also be found in other Austrian cities. For example, in 2008 there were 120 registered prostitutes in Linz, which has approximately 10% of the size of Vienna.

Before the Wende there was a relatively good cooperation between police and prostitution from which both sides had their benefits: The pimps were allowed to regulate their turf wars themselves; on the other hand they served as informants for the police. After the fall of the Iron Curtain, however, the situation changed. Many young women from the former Eastern bloc came to Austria and were willing to work for less money than the Austrian women. Additionally organized crime groups from southern and eastern Europe entered the prostitution scene in Austria.

In the following years, in particular in the 1990s, the number of registered prostitutes decreased and the number of unregistered prostitutes increased. Nowadays 60 to 90 percent are migrants, mainly from the former east bloc countries, among them many commuters from the close Slovakia. For example, the police detained several nurses from Bratislava who earned more money in one night on the streets of Vienna than in a whole month in the hospital in Bratislava.

The Austrian Federal Ministry of the Interior considers illegal prostitution as a problem because it comes along with crimes like human trafficking, pimping and rape. In addition, unregistered prostitution creates health problems. A quarter of the arrested unregistered prostitutes had multiple infections with sexually transmitted diseases. On the other hand, according to the health authorities of Vienna, registered prostitutes are the most healthy group of persons. Because of this, the Austrian Federal Ministry of the Interior wants to transform illegal prostitution into legal regulated prostitution. Similar to the ministry, several human rights and migrants organizations who highlight the bad life and working conditions of prostitutes want a destabilization of prostitution and improve the working and social conditions of sex workers and to abolish the discrimination in the working rights and in the rights of residence. In early 2007 this topic was also discovered by politics and it was discussed to end the unconscionable state of prostitution and to find a legal regulation similar to the German law.

Support for (migrant) sex workers in Austria exists since the beginning of the 1990s through the NGO LEFÖ (Information, Education and Support for Migrant Women) LEFÖ is the Austrian partner of the pan-European network TAMPEP that provides HIV/STI prevention and health promotion among (migrant) sex workers. Other counselling centres for sex workers exist in Vienna (Sophie) and Linz (LENA). Additionally the organization Maiz in Linz offers consulting for migrants working in the sex industry. Since 2005, the group www.sexworker.at is a platform for sex workers and allies that is based in Vienna and operates in the German-speaking region. They are a self-organisation of sex workers and promote the recognition of sex work as legitimate activity and the self-determination and political inclusion of sex workers into decision-making and policy development, implementation and evaluation.

There is an increase of Nigerian prostitutes in Austria, whereby it was found out that many of them are victims of human trafficking and forced prostitution. The NGO Exit documents stories of these victims to increase public awareness. Furthermore, Exit counsels victims who seek help in special African dialects. The exit was initiated by Joana Adesuwa Reiterer, a Nigerian actress and writer based in Vienna who, after escaping a marriage with a pimp, started her research on human trafficking from Africa to Austria for sexual exploitation.

=== COVID-19 – 2020 coronavirus pandemic ===
The COVID-19 pandemic has hugely impacted the Austrian and Vienna prostitution scene and establishments had to be closed until further notice. The federal government has restricted most outdoor activities and banned non-essential businesses from being operational in order to slow down the infection rate in Austria. Additionally, gatherings of larger numbers of people have also been restricted.

All sex clubs and bars, Saunaclubs, studios, escort agencies and other types of adult establishments have ceased doing business until they are allowed to be open. The women who work in brothels have travelled back to their country of origin until they are allowed to work again. Most of the biggest establishments have notified their customers about their businesses being closed either through their website, via newsletters or other online information sharing portals.

Prostitution in Vienna experienced a surge in illegally working women after the reopening of adult establishments on 1 July. The reason for this is the new COVID-19 test that is required from everyone who wishes to work legally in any establishment in Vienna. With over 3,000 applicants and only around 60 tests per day, some women need to wait up to a few months before they can acquire their legal documents and start working again. As a result of this, many try to work illegally through private apartments. The Vienna Police Department raided a number of these apartments and fined the women who work there and the owners who rented the apartments out.

==== Timeline of restrictions and how the places were allowed to open again ====
- 14 April 2020: From 14 April 2020 shops with a maximum sales area of 400 m2, DIY and garden centres have reopened. People must wear masks and only one customer per 20 nm is allowed. Supermarkets, pharmacies, banks and post offices are also open. Restaurants, cafés, brothels and other community places are still closed.
- 4 May 2020: Restaurants, bars, cafés may reopen between 6 am and 11 pm from 15 May, under certain conditions. Brothels and similar establishments must be closed until 1 July. Indoor leisure facilities and swimming pools may open with restrictions on 29 May 2020.
- 20 May 2020: Sex workers can start taking the mandatory health checks to from this date. They are required to make an appointment beforehand and they are not allowed to simply walk in unannounced. Additionally, the women who take the test will receive their stamp of approval only on 1 July.
- 1 July 2020: Adult entertainment businesses in Austria have been allowed to open again with minor restrictions to opening hours. The women who wish to work legally are required to undergo a COVID-19 test to prove that they are not infected. Because of the large number of applicants, the waiting times for the tests are very long. As a result of this, many women have turned to illegal prostitution in Vienna.
- 31 August 2020: Sex workers in Vienna who wish to acquire their Green Health Cards which are required for legal work can now book their appointment through the Center for Sexual Health (Zentrum für Sexuelle Gesundheit) website. The online application form that was introduced makes it much easier for ladies to make an appointment with their doctors and acquire the necessary documents to start working legally in Vienna. Ladies who are returning for their check-ups can also use the website to book their appointment.
- 4 September 2020: Although all adult establishments have been allowed to open, not every club in Vienna managed to return to doing business. Most businesses managed to re-open their doors, but some, such as the Beverly Hills club stayed closed even after the restrictions have been lifted on 1 July.

=== After the Coronavirus Pandemic ===
According to an expert from the Federal Criminal Police Office of Austria, there were approximately 7,000-8,000 sex workers in Austria before the coronavirus pandemic, working in approximately 800 legal and illegal brothels in the country. After the pandemic, the number of sex workers known to the police decreased to 5,000-6,000. As of 2024, approximately 2,000-3,000 sex workers are working illegally, offering their services in private apartments and hotel rooms.

This has a huge effect on legal brothels, as more and more girls leave the legal industry to work illegally, and the brothels are struggling to find new girls. The decrease in girls can lead to fewer guests, which in turn pushes more girls to leave those brothels.

In 2023, the Vienna Police conducted 83 raids in Vienna's red-light district and inspected 217 private apartments, finding 614 violations of the Vienna Prostitution Act. The fines included 200 Euros for unregistered prostitution, 400 Euros for working illegally in private apartments, and 400 Euros for working as a prostitute without health checks.

The police authorities in Vienna and other Austrian cities conduct raids regularly and track the girls' adverts on the biggest Austrian erotic portals.

== Politics ==
The Young Socialists (Sozialistische Jugend Österreich) have a policy on prostitution, in their women's platform (Frauenpolitik). While considering prostitution a social evil that should be eradicated, at the same time states that so long as it exists the party advocates solidarity with sex workers, their protection and opposes criminalisation as a step that merely drives the trade underground. Amongst other approaches, they suggest unionisation.

== Sex trafficking ==
Human traffickers exploit foreign victims in Austria. Statistics show no Austrian citizens among victims of trafficking. Victims originate primarily from Eastern Europe, with some victims coming from South America, and increasingly from Nigeria, China, and Southeast Asia. Over 95 percent of identified victims are foreign women subjected to sex trafficking. Approximately 65 percent of trafficking victims come from EU member states. Traffickers subject a growing number of female victims from Nigeria and China to sexual exploitation in massage parlours and brothels. The Federal Crime Office implemented programs with China and Nigeria to combat cross-border trafficking and improve and expand joint investigations.

Traffickers use Austria as a transit point in moving victims to other European countries. In 2018, the government subsidised an NGO brochure, in 14 languages, for distribution mainly to persons working in prostitution, to increase awareness of trafficking occurring within the commercial sex industry.

According to police, there also were some women who knowingly entered the country to work as prostitutes but were forced into dependency akin to slavery. Most victims were in the country illegally and feared being turned over to authorities and deported. Traffickers usually retained victims' official documents, including passports, to maintain control over them. Victims reported being subjected to threats and physical violence. A major deterrent to victim cooperation with authorities was fear of retribution, both in Austria and in the victims' countries of origin.

Austria meets the standards of the US Victims of Trafficking and Violence Protection Act, and is therefore rated as a 'Tier 1' country in the annual Trafficking in Persons Report.

== Literature ==
- Josef Schrank: Die Prostitution in Wien in historischer, administrativer und hygienischer Beziehung. 1. Band Die Geschichte der Prostitution in Wien, Selbstverlag, Wien 1886 (Online US-only at Google Books)

== See also ==
- Maxim Wien
