= Brothel =

Place of prostitution

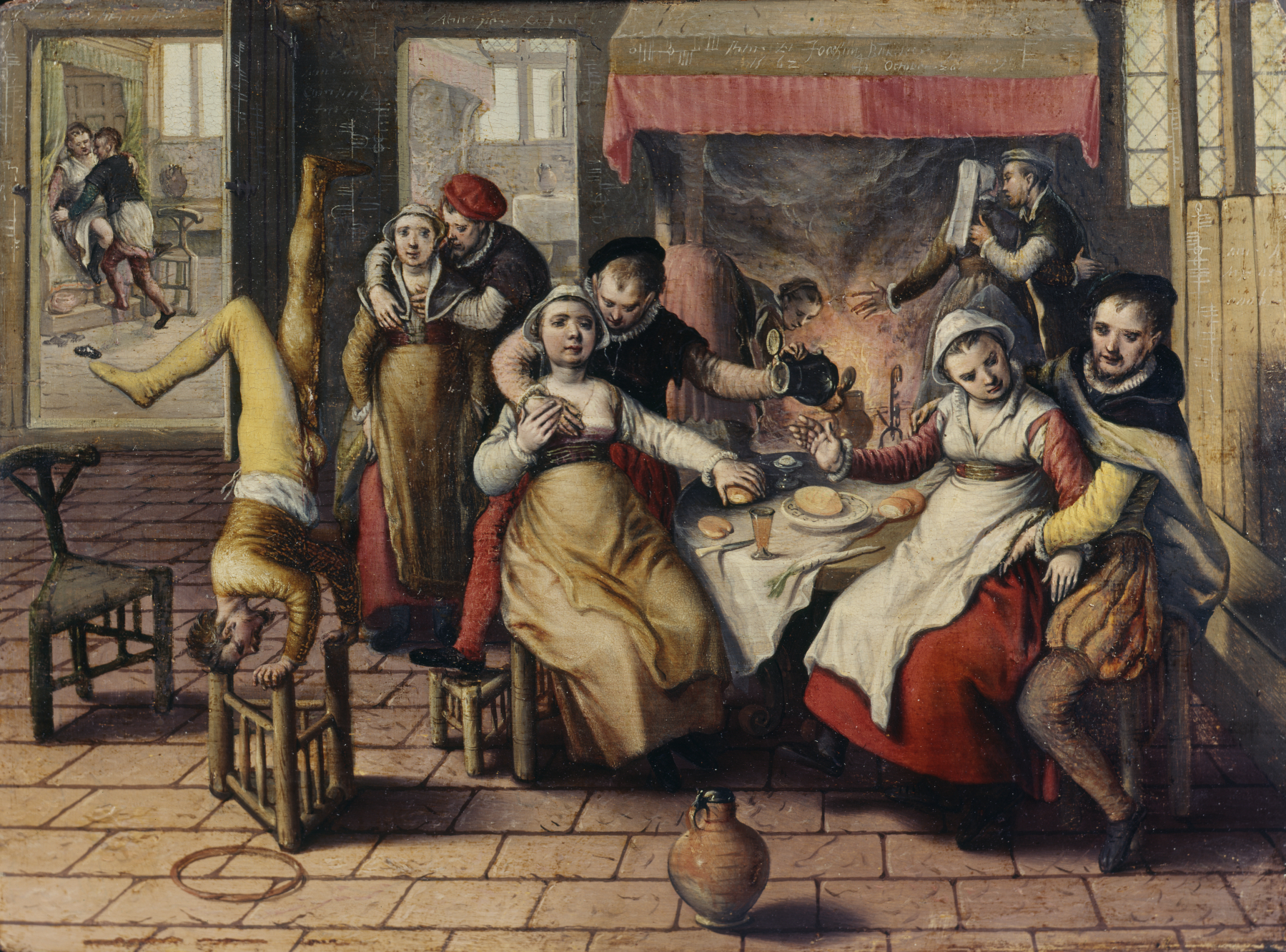
Joachim Beuckelaer, Brothel, 1562

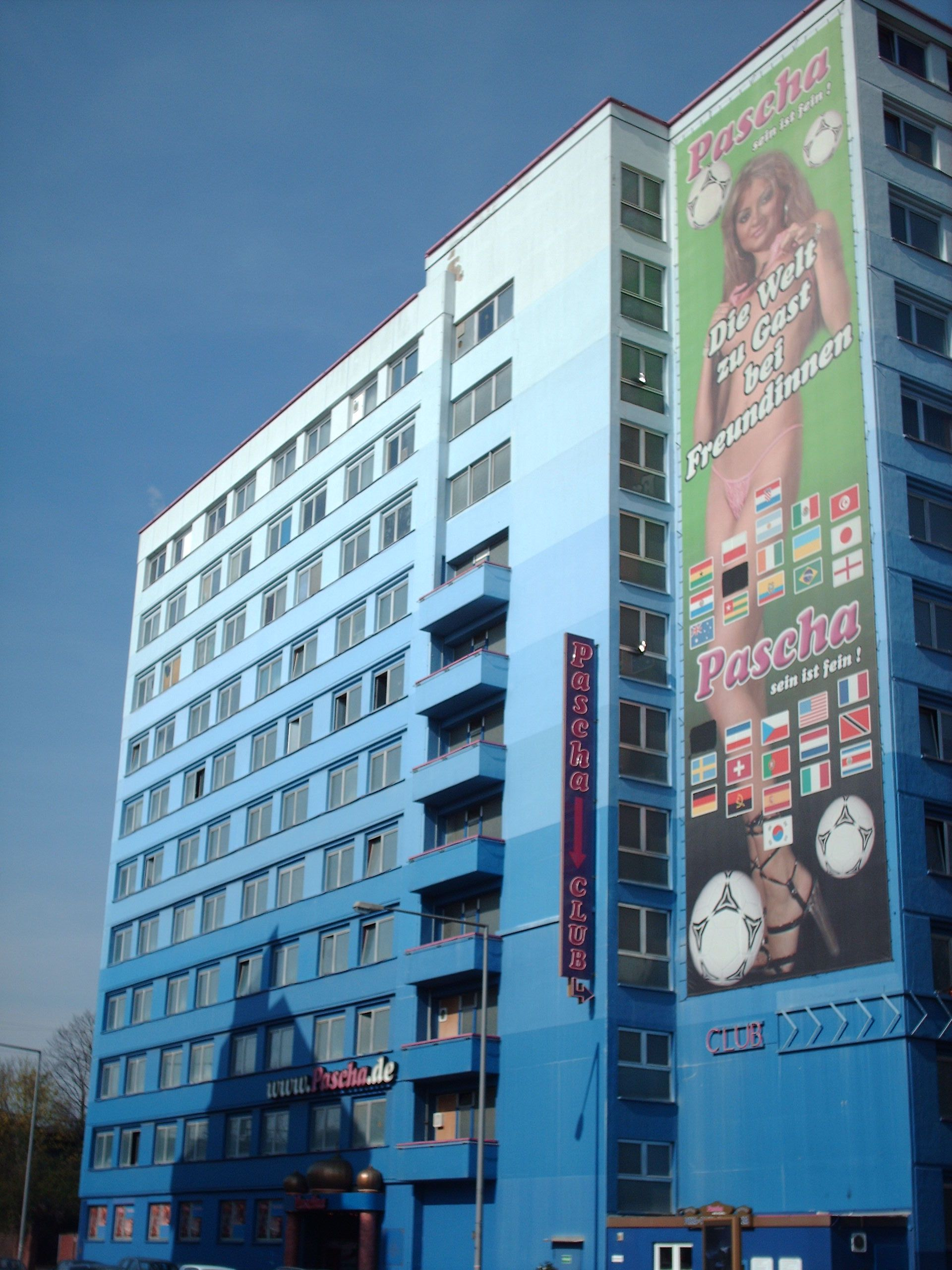
The Pascha brothel in Cologne, Germany, is the largest brothel in Europe. During the 2006 FIFA World Cup, the poster had the Saudi Arabian flag and Iranian flag blacked out after protests and threats.

A brothel, bordello, bawdy house, house of ill repute, house of ill fame, or whorehouse is a place where people engage in sexual activity with sex workers. For legal or cultural reasons, establishments often describe themselves as massage parlors, body rub parlors, or by some other description. Some establishments maintain an "on the level" business, such as "nudie bars", and "strip clubs", but offer "additional services" that might resemble a brothel. Brothels, by definition, used to require beds and/or bedrooms and resemble a hotel or rooming house. Modern places offering similar services in the 21st century in the United States typically do not, except in locations where brothels are legally allowed. Sex work in a brothel, at least in first world and well-developed countries, is almost always safer than street prostitution.

== Legal status ==
Brothels are legal only in countries and areas shown in cyan or green: Decriminalization – No criminal penalties for prostitution Legalization – prostitution legal and regulated Abolitionism – prostitution is legal, but organized activities such as brothels and pimping are illegal; prostitution is not regulated Neo-abolitionism – illegal to buy sex and for 3rd party involvement, legal to sell sex Prohibitionism – prostitution illegal Legality varies with local laws

On 2 December 1949, the United Nations General Assembly approved the Convention for the Suppression of the Traffic in Persons and of the Exploitation of the Prostitution of Others. The convention came into effect on 25 July 1951 and by December 2013, had been ratified by 82 states. The convention seeks to combat prostitution, which it regards as "incompatible with the dignity and worth of the human person". Parties to the convention agreed to abolish regulation of individual prostitutes and to ban brothels and procuring. Some countries not parties to the convention also ban prostitution or the operation of brothels.

Various United Nations commissions, however, have differing positions on the issue. For example, in 2012, a Joint United Nations Programme on HIV/AIDS (UNAIDS) convened by Ban Ki-moon and backed by United Nations Development Programme and UNAIDS, recommended decriminalization of brothels and procuring.

Prostitution and the operation of brothels is illegal in many countries, though known illegal brothels may be tolerated or laws not strictly enforced. Such situations exist in many parts of the world, but the region most often associated with these policies is Asia. When brothels are illegal, they may nevertheless operate in the guise of a legitimate business, such as massage parlors, saunas or spas.

In a few countries, prostitution and operating a brothel is legal and regulated. The degree of regulation varies widely by country. Most of these countries allow brothels, at least in theory, as they are considered to be less problematic than street prostitution.

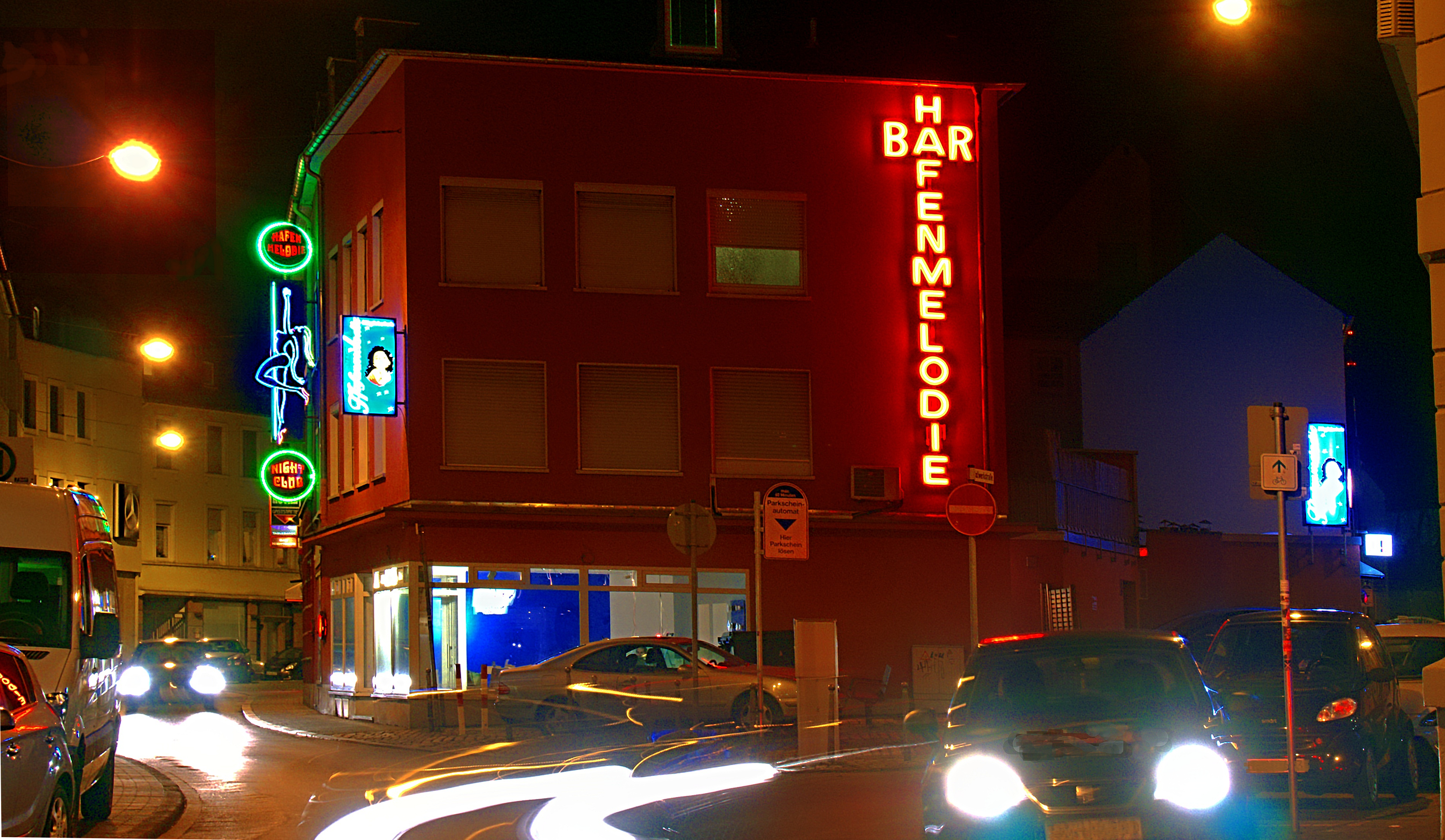
Brothel Hafenmelodie Trier (Germany)

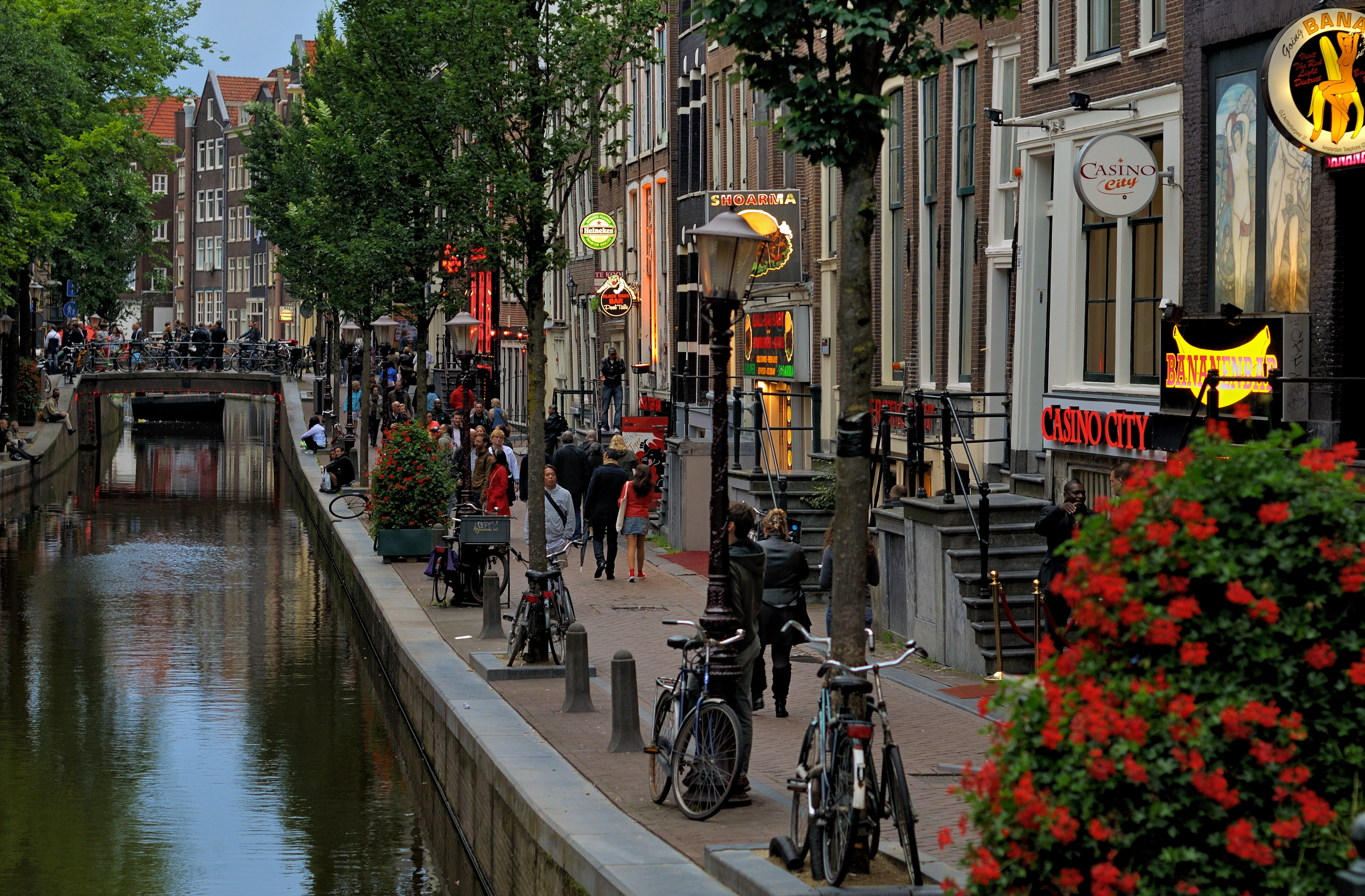
De Wallen, Amsterdam's red-light district, offers activities such as legal prostitution and a number of coffee shops that sell marijuana. It is one of the main tourist attractions.

In the European Union, there is no uniform policy and no consensus on the issue, and laws vary widely from country to country. The Netherlands has one of the most liberal prostitution policies in the world and attracts sex tourists from many other countries. Amsterdam is well known for its red-light district and is a destination for sex tourism. Germany also has very liberal prostitution laws. The largest brothel in Europe is the Pascha in Cologne.

In Sweden (and in Norway and Iceland outside the EU) the buying, but not selling, of sex, is illegal; in most former Communist countries the laws target the prostitutes; while in countries such as the UK (except Northern Ireland), Italy, and Spain the act of prostitution is not itself illegal, but soliciting, pimping and brothels are, making it difficult to engage in prostitution without breaking any law. The European Women's Lobby condemns prostitution as "an intolerable form of male violence" and supports the "Swedish model".

In February 2014, the members of the European Parliament voted in a non-binding resolution, (adopted by 343 votes to 139; with 105 abstentions), in favor of the Swedish model of criminalizing the buying, but not the selling, of sex.

In parts of Australia, brothels are legal and regulated. Regulation includes planning controls and licensing and registration requirements, and there may be other restrictions to help improve the safety of sex workers, punters (customers of prostitution), and to reduce crime. However, the existence of licensed brothels does not stop illegal brothels from operating. According to a report in the Australian Daily Telegraph, illegal brothels in Sydney in 2009 outnumbered licensed operations by four to one, while in Queensland only 10% of prostitution happens in licensed brothels, with the rest being either independent sex workers (which is legal) or illegal operations.

Brothels are currently illegal throughout the United States, except in 10 rural counties in Nevada. Prostitution outside of the 19 licensed brothels operating in 6 of those 10 counties is illegal throughout the state. All forms of prostitution are illegal in Clark County, which contains the Las Vegas–Paradise metropolitan area. The Dumas Hotel in Butte, Montana, operated legally from 1890 until 1982.

== History ==
Henri de Toulouse-Lautrec, Salon at the Rue des Moulins, 1894

The earliest recorded mention of prostitution as an occupation appears in Sumerian records from c. 2400 BCE and describes a temple-bordello operated by Sumerian priests in the city of Uruk. The 'kakum' or temple was dedicated to the goddess Ishtar and housed three classes of women. The first group performed only in the temple sex-rites; the second group had the run of the grounds and catered to its visitors as well, and the third and lowest class lived on the temple grounds but were free to seek out customers in the streets. In later years, sacred prostitution and similar classifications of women existed in Greece, Rome, India, China, and Japan.

=== Europe ===
State brothels/bordellos with regulated prices existed in ancient Athens, created by the legendary lawmaker Solon. These brothels catered to a predominantly male clientele, with women of all ages and young men providing sexual services (see Prostitution in ancient Greece). In ancient Rome female slaves were forced to provide sexual services for soldiers, with brothels being located close to barracks and city walls. Brothels existed everywhere. The custom was to display lit candles to signal that they were open.

Before the appearance of effective contraception, infanticide was common in brothels. Unlike usual infanticide—where girls were more likely to be killed at birth—a brothel site at Ashkelon in Israel revealed that nearly all of the babies were boys.

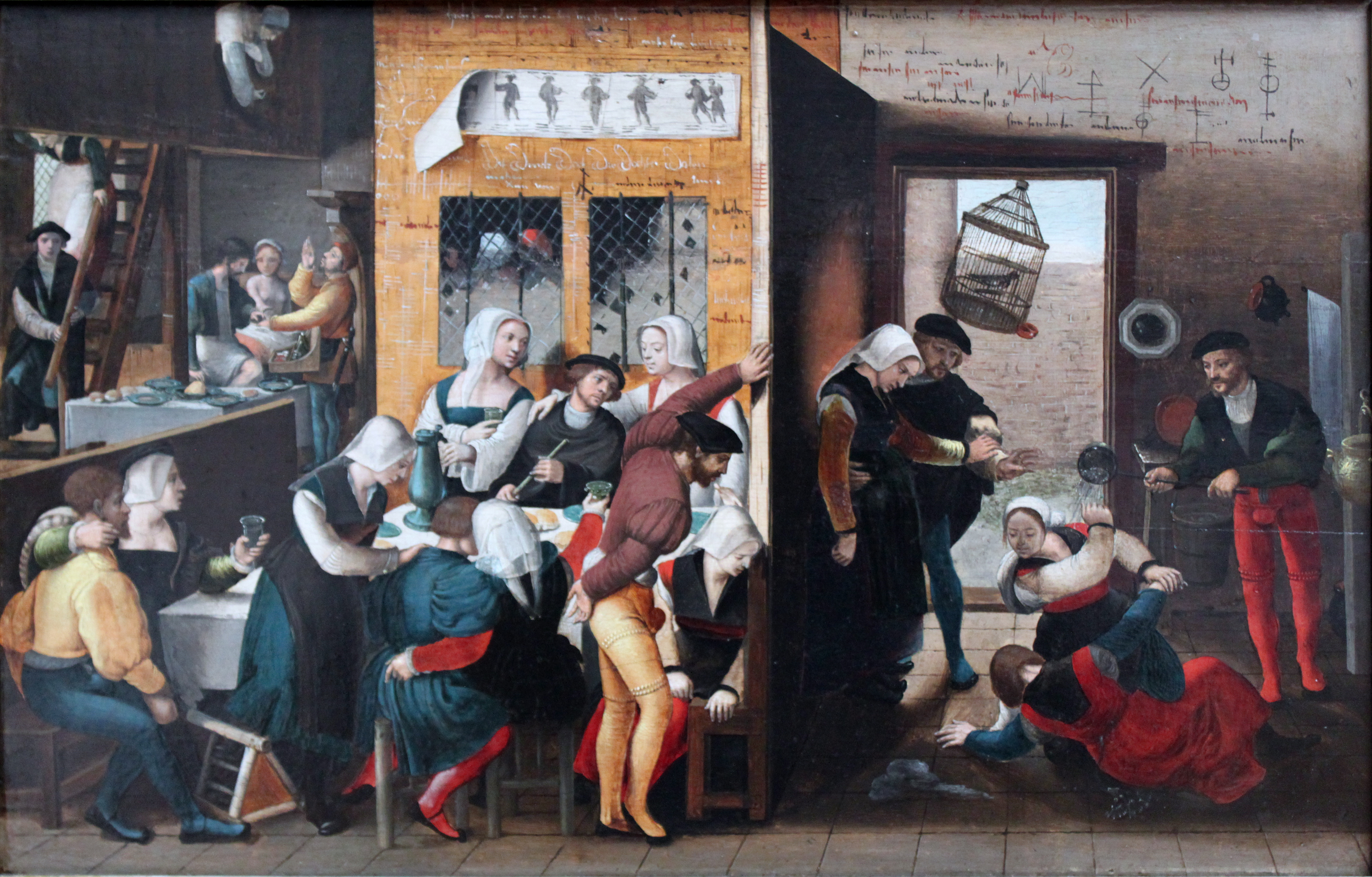
Brothel scene; Brunswick Monogrammist, 1537; Gemäldegalerie, Berlin

Cities first began setting up municipal brothels between 1350 and 1450 CE. Municipalities often owned, operated, and regulated the legal brothels. Governments would designate certain streets where a keeper could open a brothel. These sections of town were the precursors to so-called "red light districts". Not only did the towns restrict where a keeper could open a brothel, but they also put constraints on when the brothel could be open. For example, most brothels were forbidden to be open on Sundays and religious holidays. Some scholars believe these restrictions were enforced to make the prostitutes go to church but others argue that it was to keep parishioners in church and out of the brothels. Either way, it was a day providing no revenue for the keeper.

Although brothels were set up as a sexual outlet for men, not all men were allowed to enter them. Clerics, married men, and Jews were prohibited. Often, foreigners such as sailors and traders were the main source of revenue. Local men who frequented the brothels were mainly single; laws restricting the patrons were not always enforced. Government officials or police would periodically search the brothels to reduce the number of prohibited customers. However, since the government was so closely related to the church, common punishments were minor. These restrictions were put in place to protect the wives of married men from infections.

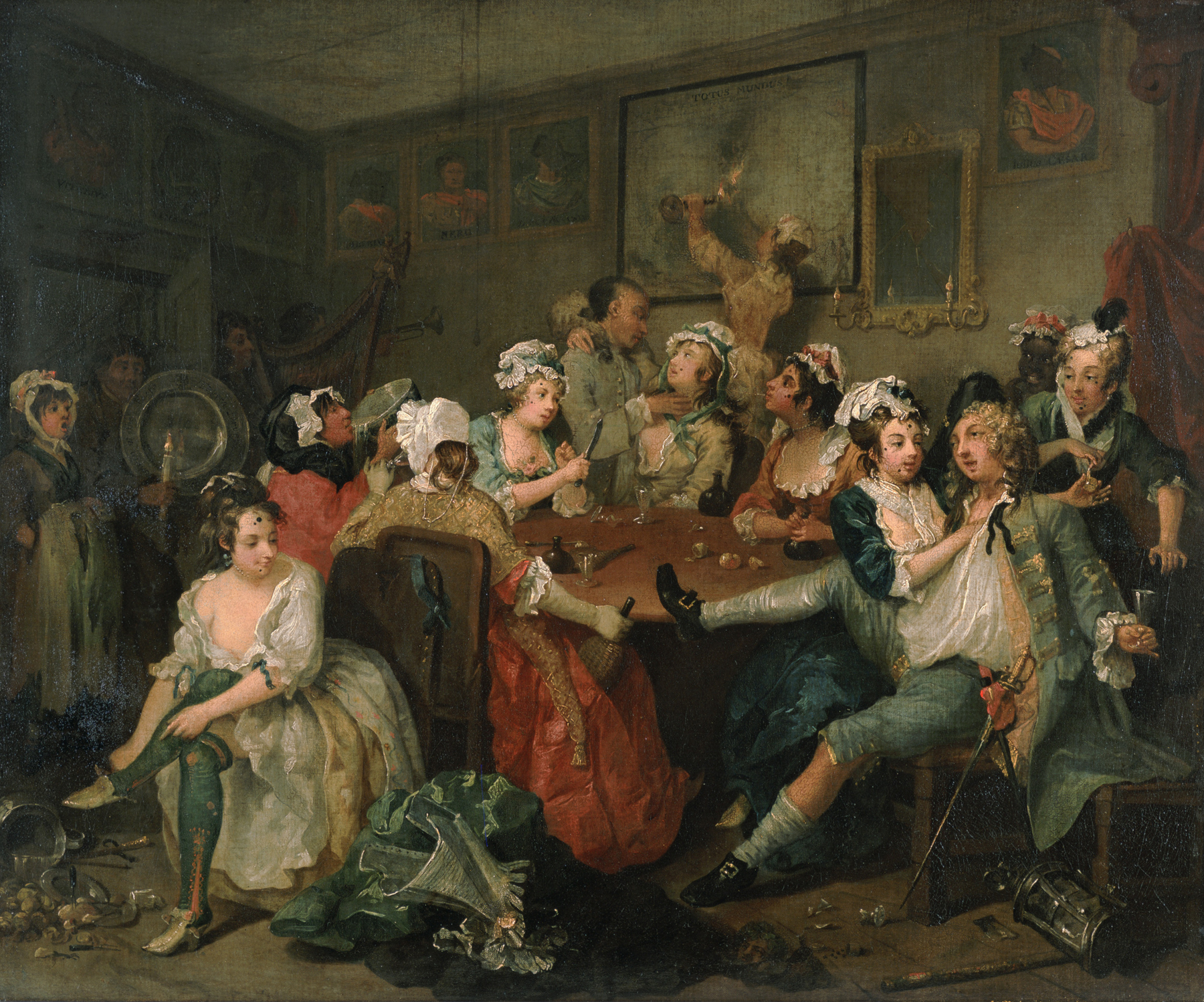
The Brothel Scene from A Rake's Progress by William Hogarth, 1735

Multiple restrictions were placed on the residents of brothels. One limitation prohibited prostitutes from borrowing money from their brothel keeper. Prostitutes paid high prices to the brothel keeper for the basic necessities of room and board, clothes, and toiletries. Room and board pricing was often set by the local government but the price for everything else could add up to a common woman's entire earnings. Prostitutes were sometimes prohibited from having a special lover. Some regulations put on prostitutes were made to protect their clients. A woman was kicked out if she was found to have a sexually transmitted disease. The prostitutes were not allowed to pull men into the brothel by their clothing, harass them in the street, or detain them over unpaid debts. Clothing worn by prostitutes was regulated and had to be distinguishable from that of respectable women. In some places, a prostitute had to have a yellow stripe on her clothing while in others red was the differentiating color. Other towns required harlots to don special headdresses or restricted the wardrobe of proper women. The restrictions placed on prostitutes were put in place not only to protect them but also nearby citizens.

Because of a syphilis epidemic throughout Europe, many brothels were shut down during the end of the Middle Ages. This epidemic had been brought on by Spanish and French military pillages after the return of Christopher Columbus from the newly discovered Americas. The church and citizens alike feared that men who frequented brothels would bring the disease home and infect morally upright people.

From the 12th century, brothels in London were located in a district known as the Liberty of the Clink. This area was traditionally under the authority of the Bishop of Winchester, not the civil authorities. From 1161, the bishop was granted the power to license prostitutes and brothels in the district. This gave rise to the slang term Winchester Goose for a prostitute. Women who worked in these brothels were denied Christian burial and buried in the unconsecrated graveyard known as Cross Bones.

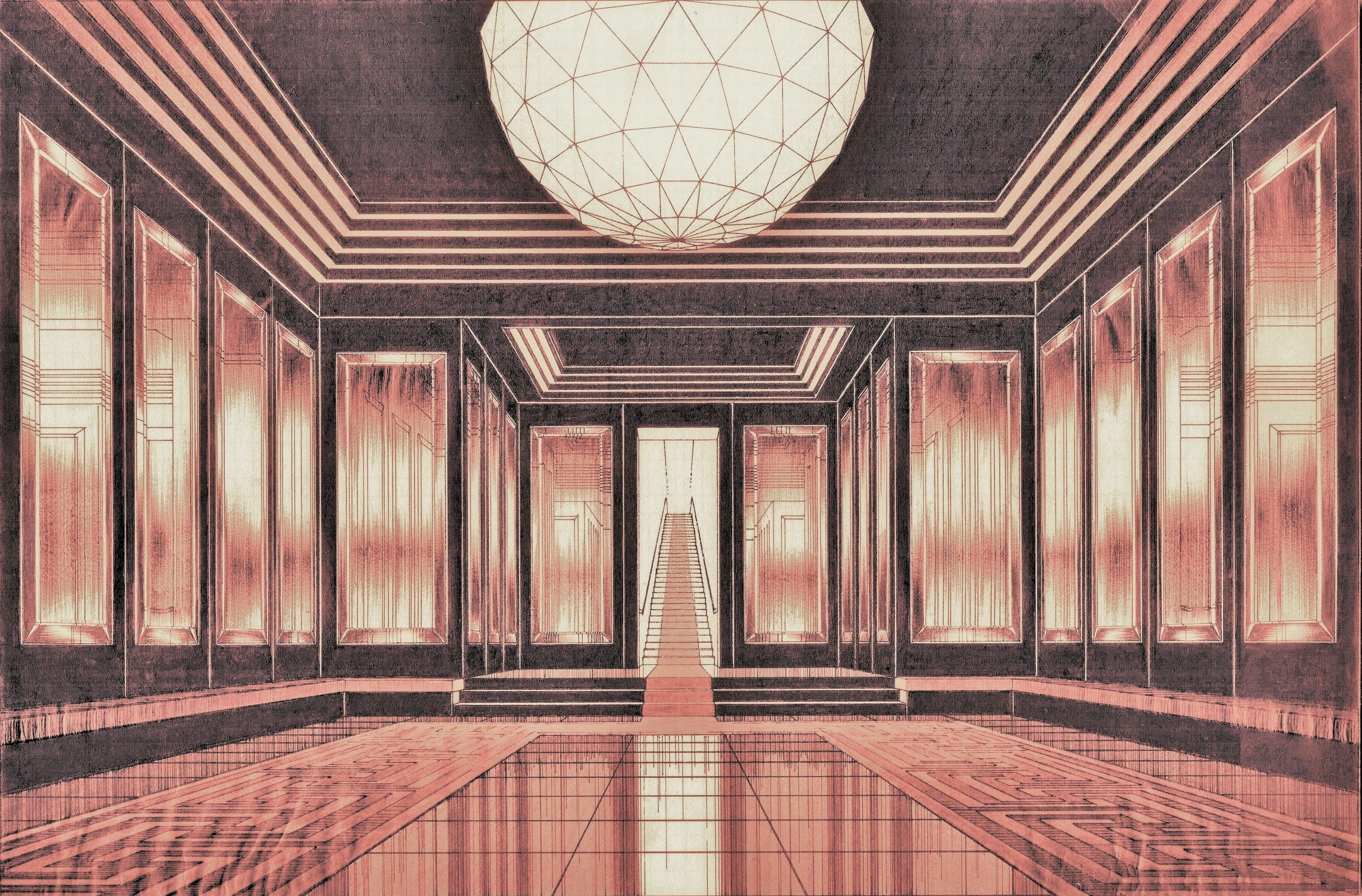
Interior of a luxurious brothel: "Waiting room in the house of M.me B.", project by Italian architect Arnaldo dell'Ira, Rome, 1939.

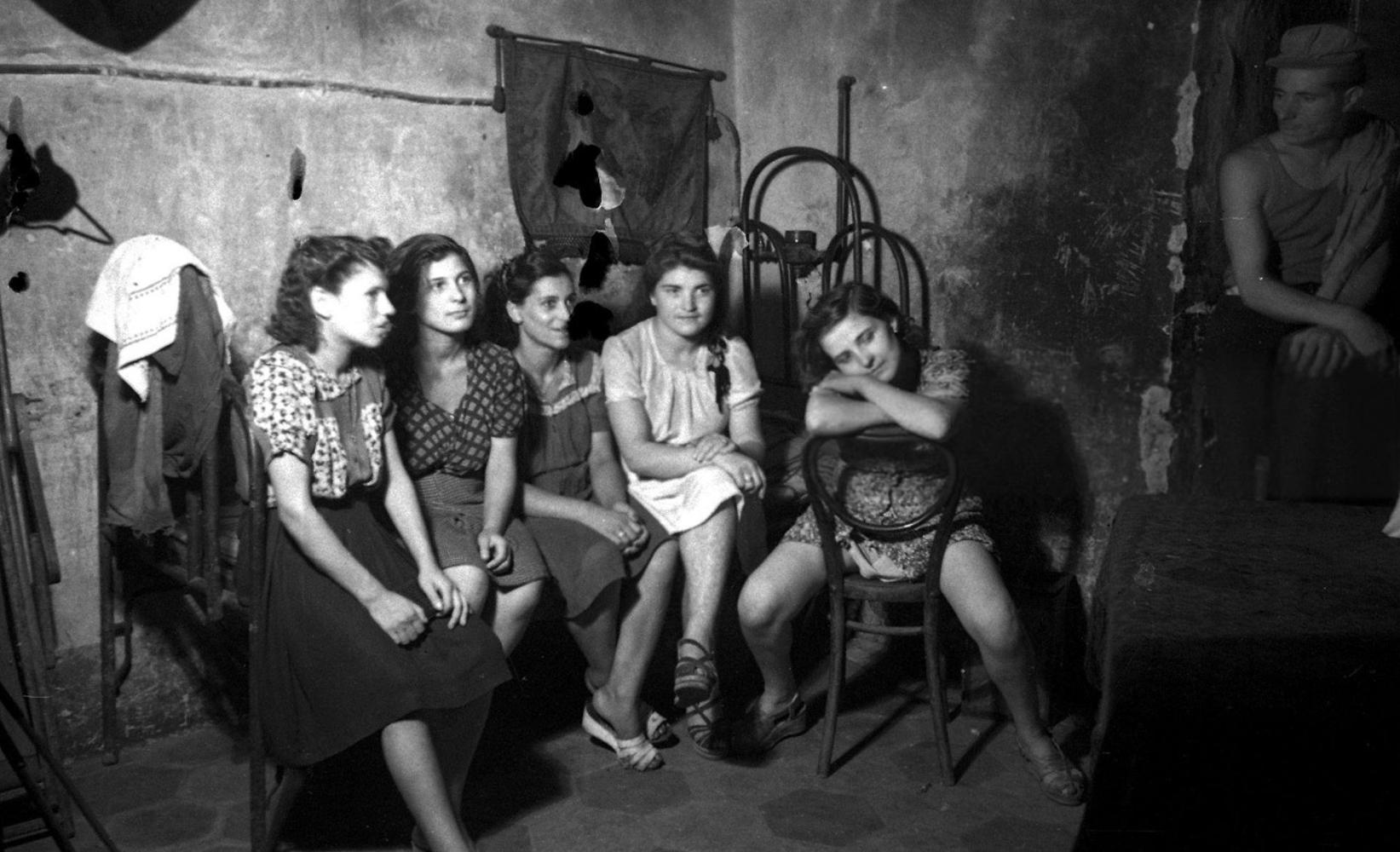
Interior of a brothel in Naples, Italy, 1945

By the 16th century, the area was also home to many theatres, (including the Globe Theatre, associated with William Shakespeare), but brothels continued to thrive. A famous London brothel of the time was Holland's Leaguer. Patrons supposedly included James I of England and his favourite, George Villiers, 1st Duke of Buckingham. It was located in a street that still bears its name and also inspired the 1631 play, Holland's Leaguer. Charles I of England licensed a number of brothels including the Silver Cross Tavern in London, which retains its license to the modern day because it was never revoked.

The authorities of Medieval Paris followed the same path as those in London and attempted to confine prostitution to a particular district. Louis IX (1226–1270) designated nine streets in the Beaubourg Quartier where it would be permitted. In the early part of the 19th century, state-controlled legal brothels (then known as "maisons de tolérance" or "maisons closes") started to appear in several French cities. By law, they had to be run by a woman (typically a former prostitute) and their external appearance had to be discreet. The maisons were required to light a red lantern when they were open (from which is derived the term red-light district) and the prostitutes were only permitted to leave the maisons on certain days and only if accompanied by its head. By 1810, Paris alone had 180 officially approved brothels.

During the first half of the 20th century, some Paris brothels, such as le Chabanais and le Sphinx, were internationally known for the luxury they provided. The French government sometimes included a visit to the Chabanais as part of the program for foreign guests of state, disguising it as a visit with the President of the Senate in the official program. The Hotel Marigny, established in 1917 in the 2nd arrondissement of Paris, was one of several that were well known for catering to gay male clients. Premises suspected of being gay brothels, including the Hotel Marigny were, however, subject to frequent police raids, perhaps indicating less tolerance for them from the authorities.

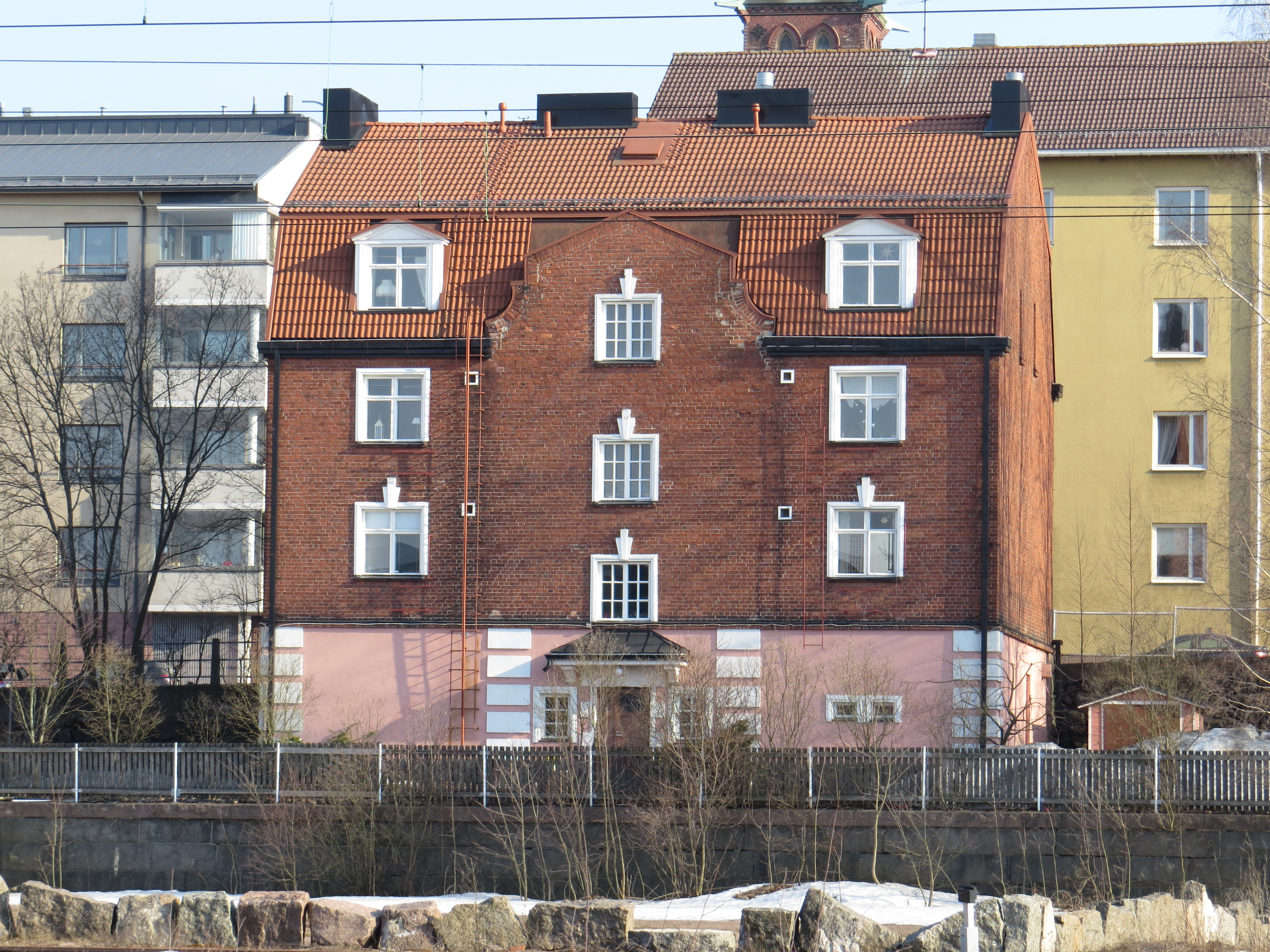
Mojdom 1, also known as the "Red House", is a brick house built in the 1920s in Kotka, Finland, which served as an illegal brothel in addition to hotel operations. Today, the house is only in residential use.

In most European countries, brothels were made illegal after World War II. France outlawed brothels in 1946, after a campaign by Marthe Richard. The backlash against them was in part due to their wartime collaboration with the Germans during the occupation of France. Twenty-two Paris brothels had been commandeered by the Germans for their exclusive use; some had made a great deal of money by catering for German officers and soldiers. One brothel in the Montmartre District of the French capital was part of an escape network for POWs and downed airmen.

Italy made brothels illegal in 1959. The 2010s decade has seen the introduction of sex dolls and sexbots on the premises of some brothels.

=== East Asia ===
Prostitution has existed in ancient China, but it was the politician Guan Zhong (管仲) who planned the brothel system. During the Spring and Autumn period in 645 BC, Qi politician Guan Zhong proposed to set up brothels in the city, and the operation of brothels was officially approved. As many as 700 women were entered into the brothels to work as prostitutes. Guan Zhong named this kind of brothel "Nvlv (女闾)". Most prostitutes in ancient China came from very poor families and were sold to brothels by their families to work as prostitutes. Prostitutes may also be asked by their families to engage in prostitution secretly outside brothels. Some girls are brought to brothels as children begging. There are also women who are resold to brothels by their husbands or lured to brothels by traffickers. The living conditions of prostitutes are not good, but the living conditions of prostitutes in high-end brothels are better than those in low-end brothels. Prostitutes in high-end brothels sell sex to wealthy and educated clients, so some prostitutes will learn some art-related content. However, high-end brothels are still places of prostitution, and prostitutes will still have to take prostitution as their main job. Their performances have a lot of pornographic content, and performances are not a professional field. In ancient China, brothels had different names, and each dynasty may have different names. There were also singing and dancing places in ancient China. These singing and dancing places also had different names, and the names also changed in different dynasties. Song and dance venues in ancient China were not brothels. Gējì were professional female song and dance performers, they were not prostitutes, as most Geji did not engage in prostitution. Geji in ancient China catered to famous poets and nobles. In addition to performing songs and dances, they would also have these men talk about poetry and have pleasant conversations. Prostitution was rarely found, but they would also develop romantic relationships with these men. This Geji culture in ancient China died out systematically during the late Qing dynasty and the Republic of China. Male prostitution also existed in ancient China; open male brothels generally appeared in the Ming and Qing dynasties, and such male brothels were officially similar to semi-open in ancient times. Male prostitutes in male brothels will also learn some arts, but like prostitutes, they are not professional performers. Male prostitutes learn arts to increase the price of prostitution, and their job content is to engage in prostitution. Male performers who are not involved in prostitution are often reluctant to associate with such male prostitutes and openly distance themselves from them. The number of male brothels and male prostitutes is far less than that of female ones, but male brothels only sell sex to wealthy male clients. During the Republic of China, due to social unrest and other problems, there were a large number of brothels and prostitutes in China. After the founding of New China, brothels were closed and prostitution and whoring were made illegal. New China treated prostitutes for sexually transmitted diseases, provided psychological counseling, taught them work skills, and arranged legitimate jobs for them to change careers.

Yūkaku (遊廓) were legal red-light districts in Japanese history, where both brothels and prostitutes, known collectively as yūjo(遊女), the higher ranks of which were known as oiran recognised by the Japanese government operated. Though prostitution was, officially, legal to engage in and pay for only in these areas, there were a number of places where prostitutes and brothels operated illegally. Yoshiwara was home to some 1,750 women in the 18th century, with records of some 3,000 women from all over Japan at one time. Many were typically indentured to their brothel; if indentured by their parents, a larger advance payment would often be received. Though contracts of indenture often did not last more than five to ten years, the debt sometimes accrued by these women could keep them working there for much longer. Many women also died of sexually transmitted diseases, or following failed abortions, before completing their contracts.

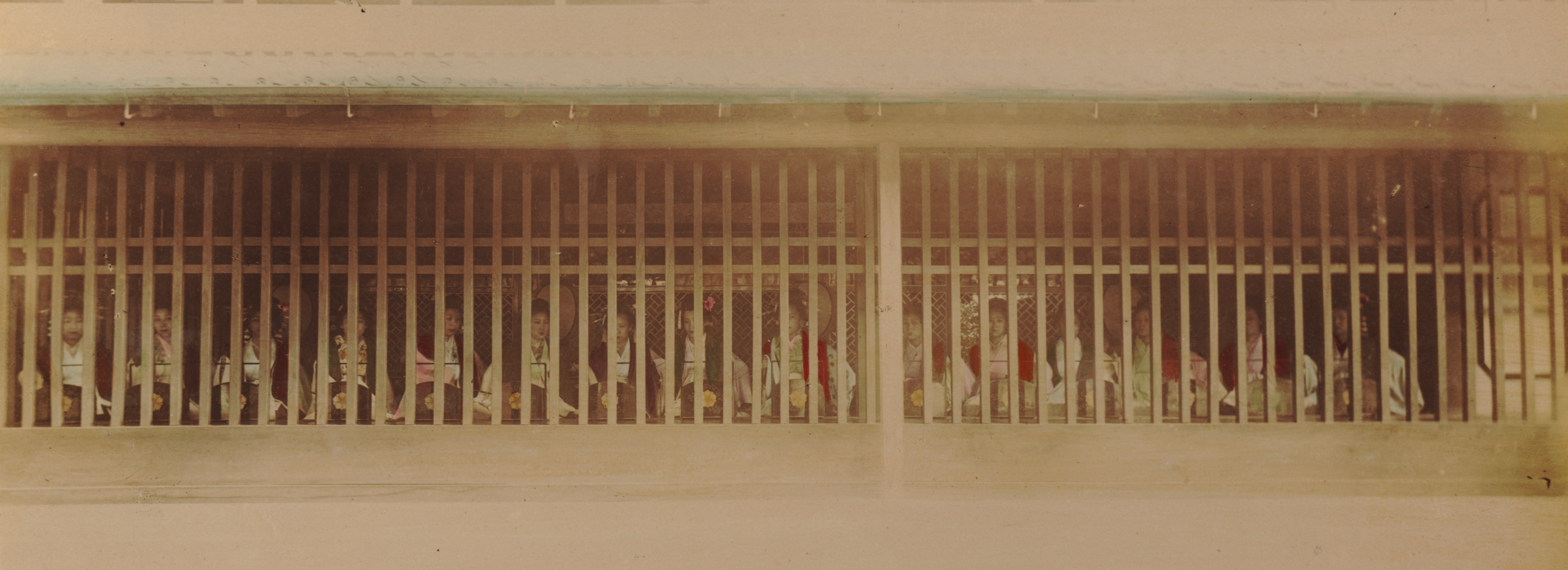
Prostitutes sitting behind harimise (張り見世) in Shizuoka in Japan, c. 1890, taken by Kusakabe Kimbei

The Yinjian teahouse (阴间茶室) refers to a male brothel that provided same-sex sexual services to men during the Edo period in Japan. Male prostitutes in brothels mainly serve male customers, but occasionally there are a few female customers. Male prostitutes in male brothels are generally between 13 and 20 years old. In Japanese history, many geishas were not prostitutes, and geisha houses were different from brothels. The geisha of Japan emphasized good table manners, artistic skills, elegant styling, and sophisticated, tactical conversational skills.

In Korean history, there were brothels where prostitutes engaged in prostitution. There are also kisaeng performing arts venues that provide performances.

=== India ===
The governments of many Indian princely states had regulated prostitution in India prior to the 1860s. The British Raj enacted the Cantonment Act of 1864 to regulate prostitution in colonial India as a matter of accepting a necessary evil so that the British soldiers could seek sexual gratification when away from their homes. The Cantonment Acts regulated and structured prostitution in the British military bases which provided for about twelve to fifteen Indian women kept in brothels called chaklas for each regiment of thousand British soldiers. They were licensed by military officials and were allowed to consort with soldiers only.

Brothels in India came into life in the early 1920s, when dance styles in states like Maharashtra, such as Lavani, and dance-drama performance artists, called Tamasha artists, started working as prostitutes. Such professions were strongly connected to caste and income levels.

=== United States ===
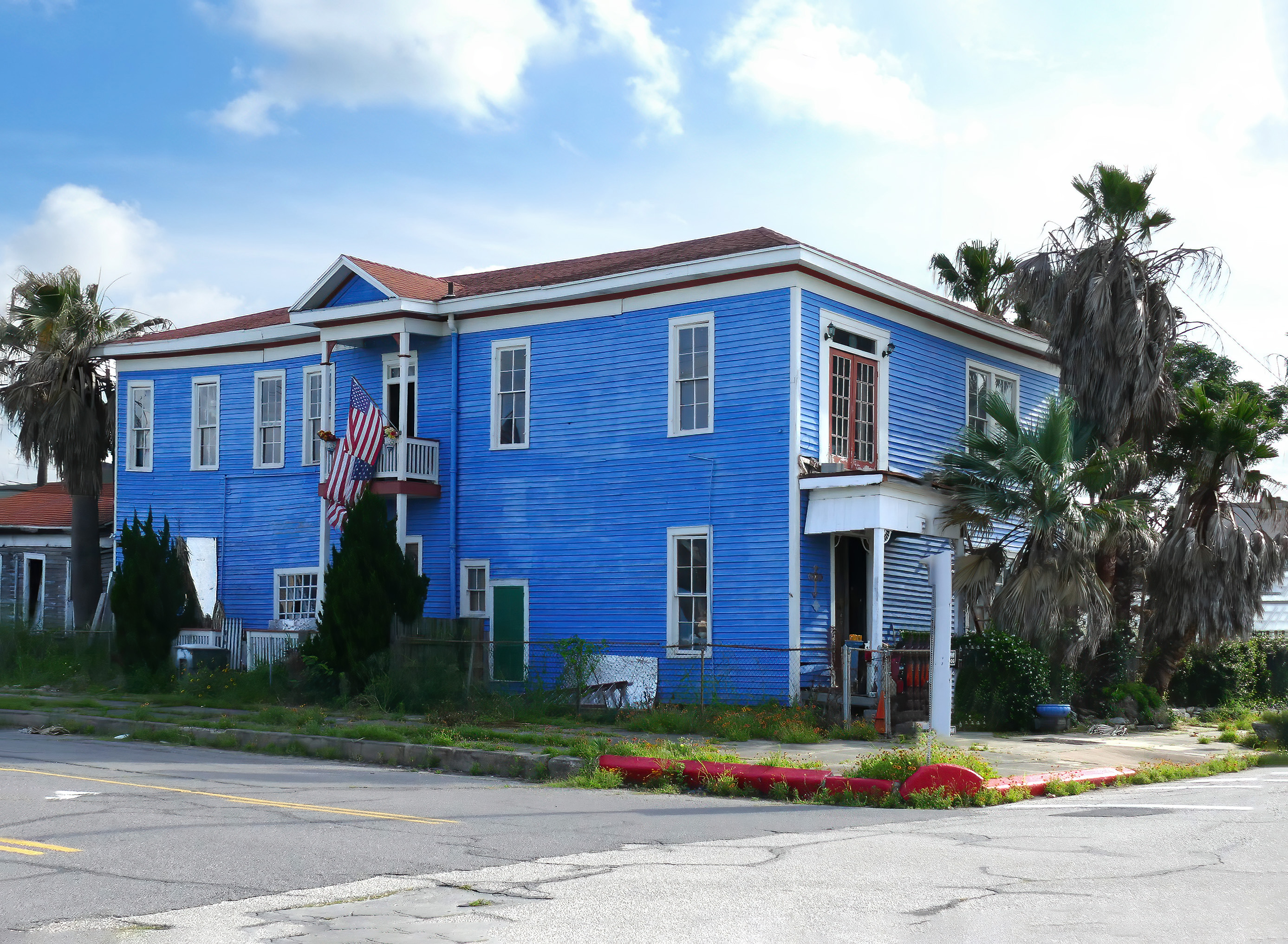
Last example of a brothel built in 1886, from the wide-open time of Galveston, Texas seen in 2021

From 1911 to 1913, the United States Department of Justice counted the numbers of prostitutes in brothels to use the data against the much-feared "White Slave Traffic". This effort collected information from 318 cities of 26 Eastern states. It estimated about 100,000 women to be working in brothels, yet some estimated the total number of prostitutes to be as high as 500,000.

During the late nineteenth century, brothels in the United States were no secret. George Kneeland articulated his growing concern about the organized sex business in America well, saying that prostitution had grown into a "highly commercialized and profitable business that penetrated the deepest recesses of the political, cultural and economic life of the city." Brothels were commonly referred to as "disorderly houses" (in some parts of the country, particularly during the period surrounding the gold rush, occasionally ranches), and their residents were called by many names, some euphemistic—e.g., abandoned woman, bawd good-time daisy, fallen angel, fille de joie, jeweled bird, lady of the evening, shady lady, soiled dove, wanton woman, and woman of the town—and some less kind—e.g., hooker, slut, and whore.

As the 19th century went on, prostitution as a profession became more common, rather than just occasionally necessitated soliciting. As a result of these changes, the way prostitution was practiced changed. Many prostitutes still practiced their trade independently, but the new class of professional prostitutes created a demand for a location to do their regular business, and the brothel served this purpose.

Visitors could easily find disorderly houses by opening up the local or statewide directories, such as the 1895 Travelers' Guide of Colorado. This 66-page manual helped the interested client decide which brothel was right for him. These manuals did not attract by using euphemistic language, and though bold by standards of the time, were not crude. Some examples read: "Twenty young ladies engaged nightly to entertain guest", and "Strangers cordially welcome". In some areas, brothels simply could not be ignored. A nineteenth-century authority describes the city of New Orleans as such: "The extent of licentiousness and prostitution here is truly appalling and doubtless without a parallel in the whole civilized world. The indulgence and practice are so general and common that men seldom seek to cover up their acts or go in disguise."

The average house held five to twenty working girls; some higher-end brothels also employed staff servants, musicians, and a bouncer. The typical brothel contained several bedrooms, all furnished. Some upscale brothels were much larger; such is the case with that owned by Mary Ann Hall of Arlington, Virginia. It is described as "a rather grand house with twenty-five rooms and was enclosed by a brick wall. The interior was elegantly furnished. The principal rooms on the first floor contained large oil paintings, Brussels carpets, red plush 'parlor furniture', étagères (a shelf for small ornaments), and numerous items of silver plate." An archeological dig of the area outside of Mary Ann Hall's estate revealed refuse of a quality superior to that in surrounding working-class areas. This included many champagne bottles and corks, wire cages from such bottles, perfume bottles, high-quality porcelain with gilt edging, along with remnants of exotic foods—coconut shells and berry seeds, bones from beef, fish, and pork indicating that elegant meals were being eaten at this high-class brothel. These "five and ten-dollar parlor houses" attracted wealthy men, who used the facilities much as a gentlemen's social club, where they made business and political connections, met with associates and had exquisite dinners with wine, champagne, and women. Brothels were not only for the wealthy. "One-dollar houses" were visited by those of the working class. A 1910 Kansas vice report compares the two: "A few brothels were equipped with expensive furniture and furnishings including the finest of upholstered chairs, well-done paintings, and costly rugs, while others were hovels of repulsive squalor."

Women joined brothels from all walks of life. The average prostitute was approximately 21, but many were as young as 13 or as old as 50. Typically thought of as an escape for young, poor, troubled women, brothels sometimes attracted those less expected. Trained musicians and singers sometimes were lured into it by their interest in easy money and fun times. Some others turned to brothels to get out of boring, abusive, or otherwise unfulfilling marriages. Although they might be from varied classes, ethnicities, and ages, most women who began or joined brothels had a shared goal: quick money. Many found themselves always indebted to their mistresses. Lack of credit made a prostitute unable to buy items necessary for her trade (powder, cosmetics, perfumes, and evening wear), and she was forced to buy them through her madam.

Some madams, often former prostitutes themselves, rose to become independently wealthy. One was Mary Ann Hall of Arlington, Virginia. Clearly attractive and a good businesswoman, Mary Ann purchased a lot and built a brick house. That would be the location of an upscale brothel for another 40 years, sitting right at the foot of Capitol Hill. Her brothel was very lucrative, and Mary Ann was able to buy multiple enslaved people and a summer home. She was responsible for the behavior of her prostitutes, which could prove challenging since drug abuse was common. A large focus for madams was keeping their business transactions discreet and staying on the good side of the law, which they did by contributing money to charitable organizations, schools, and churches.

Despite those efforts, much of the profit still went to legal fines and fees, since prostitution was largely illegal. Timely payment of these fines could guarantee a madam that her business could continue without fear of being shut down, usually. Brothels were expected to pay significantly higher rent than other tenants. Another upscale bordello was the Big Brick in Charleston, South Carolina, built and operated by Grace Peixotto, the daughter of the Rev. Solomon Cohen Peixotto, and the madam of the most infamous brothel in the history of the city.

A madam stayed involved in her business. Running a house with so many in it required skill. A brothel required the purchase of regular food and food preparation. A madam had to monitor the cleanliness of the brothel, including the sheets, which had to be changed several times in an evening, and a stock of wines and liquors for clientele. She was the boss of the brothel and so a madam fired and hired servants, maids, and prostitutes. New faces in the brothel were desired by patrons and so madams had to find new women to recruit. Sometimes, that meant taking in a less-than-desired woman but one with youth and good looks. The "new" prostitute received training, cosmetics, and clothes from the madam. A prostitute from Kansas City is recorded as saying that she is no match for the "proper" behavior and dress required for the famous Ice Palace in Chicago.

Disorderly houses or any other dwelling used for purposes of selling sex or other lewd acts in the early 20th century were illegal with a few exceptions: the states of Arkansas, Kentucky, Louisiana, New Mexico, and South Carolina. Penalties could range from $1,000 and time in jail to much smaller fines.

=== Military brothels ===
Until recently, in several armies around the world, mobile brothels were attached to the army as auxiliary units, especially attached to combat units on long-term deployments abroad. Because it is a controversial subject, military brothels and the women who provided sex services in them were often designated with creative euphemisms. Examples of such jargon are la boîte à bonbons ("the sweet box"), replacing the term "bordel militaire de campagne". France used mobile brothels during the First World War, the Second World War and the First Indochina War to supply sex services to French soldiers who were facing combat in areas where brothels were unusual, such as at the front line or in isolated garrisons. Brothels were outlawed in France in 1946; but the French Foreign Legion continued to use mobile brothels until the late 1990s.

During the Second World War, women drawn from throughout the Far East were forced into sexual slavery by the occupation armies of Imperial Japan in brothels known as Ianjo. These women were referred to as "comfort women". During the Second World War in Europe, Nazi Germany created military brothels where an estimated 34,140 enslaved women from Nazi-occupied Europe, particularly Poland, were forced to work as prostitutes in brothels.

After the Japanese surrender following the Second World War, the Japanese government formed the Recreation and Amusement Association and recruited 55,000 of its "patriotic women" to "sacrifice themselves" to the G.I. occupation, to protect the chastity of pure Japanese womenfolk.

In South Korea, women who worked as prostitutes for UN forces were called Western princesses. Between the 1950s and 1960s, 60% of South Korean prostitutes worked near the US military bases. Since the mid-1990s, Filipina women have worked as prostitutes for U.S. servicemen in South Korea. In 2010, the Philippine government stopped approving contracts that promoters use to bring Filipinas to South Korea to work near U.S. military bases.

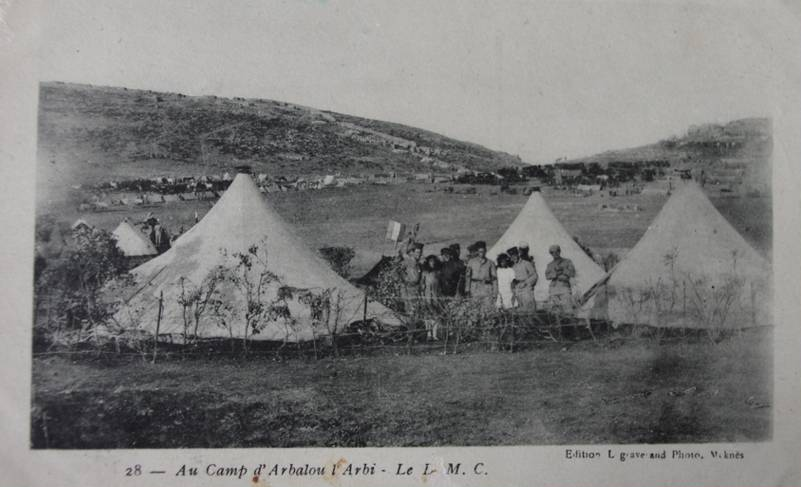
A bordel militaire de campagne in Morocco in the 1920s

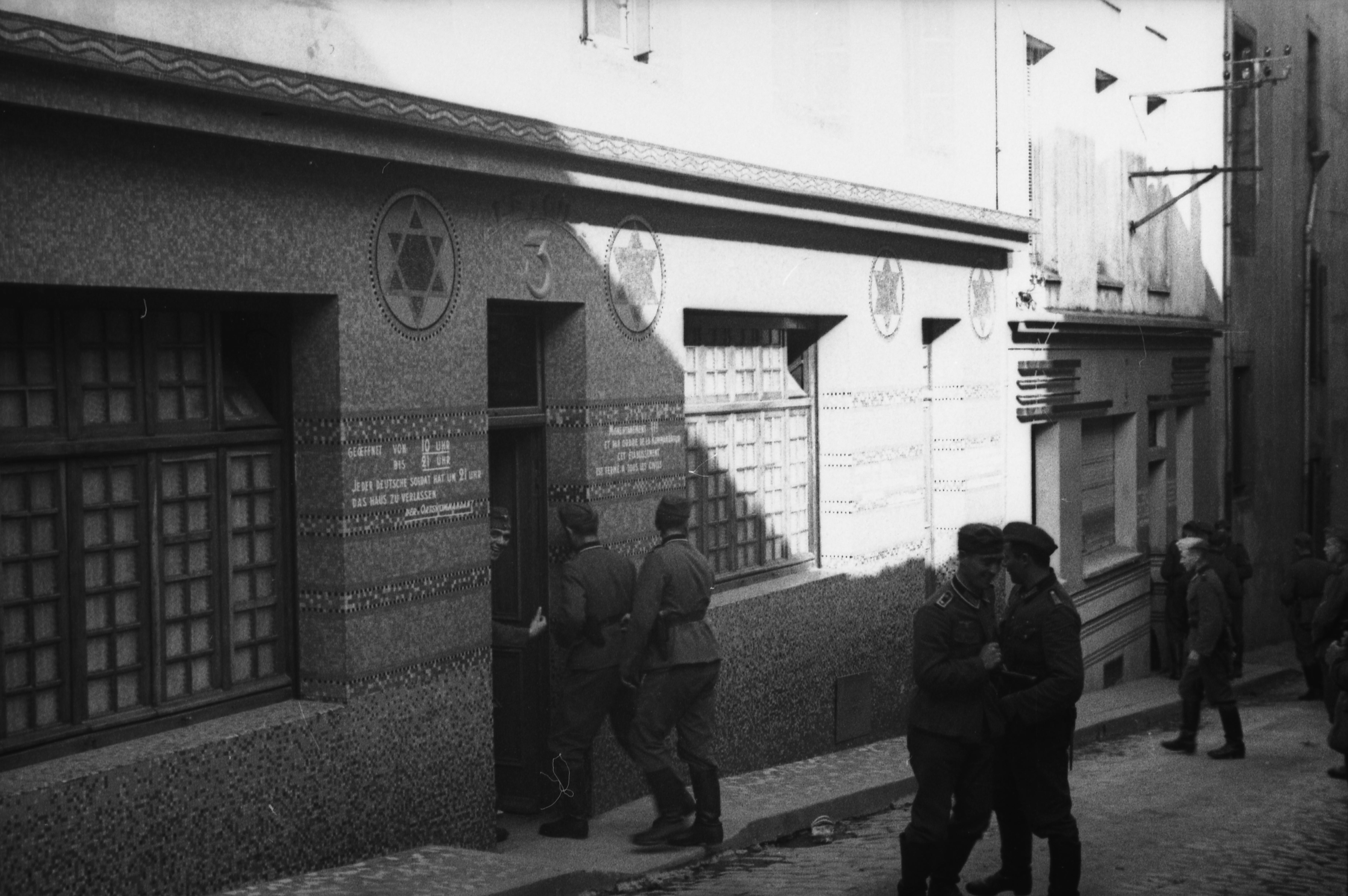
German soldiers entering a Soldatenbordell in Brest, France (1940). The building is a former synagogue.

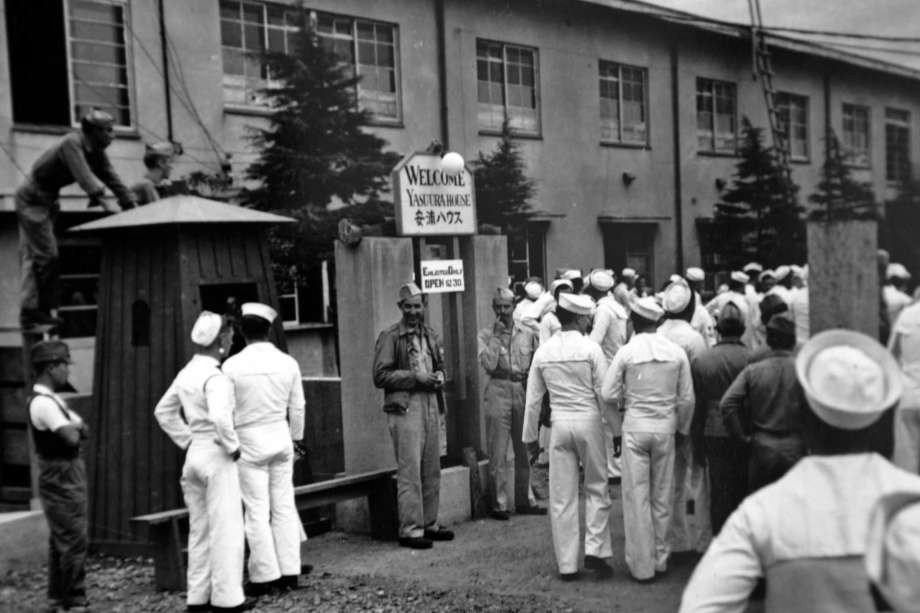
U.S. servicemen entering Recreation and Amusement Association during the occupation of Japan

== Sex doll brothel ==
Some new brothels feature only sex dolls, which means that they can operate in jurisdictions which otherwise would ban brothels which offer prostitution. Countries which have or have had sex doll brothels include:

- Japan, which has the largest number
- France, Paris: Xdolls which the French government deemed not to violate the existing prohibition of brothels
- Spain, Barcelona
- Germany, Dortmund: Bordoll (closed in 2023)
- Australia, Brisbane
- Denmark, Aarhus
- Proposed in Toronto, Canada but deemed contrary to by-laws in the city

== See also ==
- Animal brothel
- Barbary Coast, San Francisco
- Convention for the Suppression of the Traffic in Persons and of the Exploitation of the Prostitution of Others
- Gay bathhouse
- List of brothels in Nevada
- Sex on Premises Venue
- Soapland
- Spintria

=== Notable brothels ===
- Artemis, Berlin
- Lupanar, Pompeii
- Maxim Wien, Vienna

== Bibliography ==
- Bennett, Judith M. (1989). Sisters and Workers in the Middle Ages. University of Chicago Press. ISBN 9780226042473.
- Carroll, Janell L (2 January 2015). Sexuality Now: Embracing Diversity. Cengage Learning. ISBN 978-1-305-44603-8.
- Cho, Grace M. (2008). Haunting the Korean Diaspora: Shame, Secrecy, and the Forgotten War. U of Minnesota Press. ISBN 9780816652747.
- Clough, Patricia Ticineto; Halley, Jean (2007). The Affective Turn: Theorizing the Social. Duke University Press. ISBN 978-0822389606.
- Fernando, Henrique (1963). Prostitution in Europe and the New World. London, MacGibbon & Kee.
- Herbermann, Nanda (2000). The Blessed Abyss: Inmate #6582 in Ravensbrück Concentration Camp for Women. Wayne State University Press. ISBN 978-0814329207.
- Jackson, Julian (2009). Living in Arcadia: Homosexuality, Politics, and Morality in France from the Liberation to AIDS. University of Chicago Press. ISBN 9780226389288.
- Johnson, Fred (1911). The Social Evil in Kansas. Annual Report of the Board of Public Welfare of Kansas City. Kansas City, Missouri: Cline printing.
- Jones, Mark R. (2006). Wicked Charleston: Prostitutes, Politics and Prohibition. Arcadia Publishing. ISBN 9781614230335.
- Karras, Ruth Mazo (1996). Common Women : Prostitution and Sexuality in Medieval England: Prostitution and Sexuality in Medieval England. Oxford University Press. ISBN 9780198022794.
- Kneeland, George Jackson; Davis, Katharine Bement (1913). Commercialized Prostitution in New York City. Century Company.
- Levy, David (2007). "Love and Sex with Robots". Handbook of Digital Games and Entertainment Technologies. Springer, Singapore. ISBN 978-981-4560-49-8.
- McKell, Jan (2009). Red Light Women of the Rocky Mountains. Albuquerque: University of New Mexico Press.
- Milner Associates. Inventory of Mary Ann Hall's estate, 'Archeological Data Recovery'.
- Murphy, Emmett (1983). Great Bordellos of the World: An Illustrated History. Quartet Books. ISBN 9780704323957.
- Regan, Geoffrey (1992). The Guinness Book of Military Anecdotes. Canopy Books. ISBN 9781558594418. "0851125190."
- Rosen, Ruth (1983). The Lost Sisterhood: Prostitution in America, 1900–1918. Johns Hopkins University Press. ISBN 978-0801826658.
- Walford, Edward (1878). "Southwark: Winchester House and Barclay's Brewery". Old and New London: Volume 6. London: Cassell, Petter & Galpin.
- Walkoitz, Judith K. (29 October 1982). Prostitution and Victorian Society. Cambridge University Press. ISBN 978-0521270649.
- Webb, Willard J. (October 2004). "Mary Ann Hall: Arlington's illustrious madam". The Arlington Historical Magazine. Vol. 12, no. 4. Arlington, VA.
- Windrow, Martin (2004). The Last Valley: Dien Bien Phu and the French Defeat in Vietnam. Perseus Books Group. ISBN 9780306813863.
- Woolston, Howard B. (1969). Prostitution in the United States: Prior to the Entrance of the United States into the World War. Montclair, New Jersey: Patterson Smith.
