= Grace Peixotto =

American madam

Grace Cohen Peixotto
- Born: October 30, 1817; Saint Thomas, Danish West Indies
- Died: May 1, 1880 (aged 62); Charleston, South Carolina, US
- Resting place: Magnolia Cemetery
- Occupation: Madam
- Known for: "Big Brick" Brothel
- Spouse(s): Capt. Jacob Standish Myers, Sr.

Grace Peixotto (October 30, 1817 – May 1, 1880) was an American brothel owner. She owned the "Big Brick" in Charleston, South Carolina.

== Personal life ==
Grace Peixotto was born on October 30, 1817, on the island of St. Thomas. She was the daughter of Rabbi Solomon Cohen Peixotto and Rachel Suares. She was the fifth of nine children. Her family emigrated from St. Thomas to South Carolina in 1818. Her older siblings were born in Curaçao, and her younger siblings in Charleston, South Carolina. Her father officiated as the hazan in both St. Thomas and Charleston. His congregation in Charleston was Kahal Kadosh Beth Elohim, where he succeeded Hartwig Cohen, and served from 1823 to 1835. By the time she was twenty years old, both of Grace's parents had died. James William Hagy states in his book that Grace Peixotto never married. New evidence has come to light that she in fact did marry Capt. James Standish Myers, Sr. on her deathbed in April 1880. He was named executor of her estate according to documents uncovered at the Charleston County Library's South Carolina Room.

== Career ==
Peixotto was a brothel madam. For $2,000, she purchased a lot in Charleston on Beresford Street that measured 62 feet by 82 feet. There, in 1852, she built a three-story brick structure, which would become the "Big Brick" brothel. Later, Peixotto constructed two adjacent additional buildings, one a two-story, the other another three-story. She became a wealthy woman, and by 1860 owned seven slaves. Peixotto asked the city council to pave the area in front of her fourth ward residence, contending that she had dedicated it "to the citizens of Charleston." She rejected the term "disorderly" to describe her house, a common euphemism for brothels in the nineteenth and twentieth centuries:

I know that you policemen have to make your money on the side and that we have to pay you for protection, and that's all right. I know that you have to have a raid every once in a while and fine us, and that's all right. But there's one thing I object to. I object to you writing the charge against me for maintaining a disorderly house. I want to have you know that I have the most quiet, respectable, ladylike whores south of the Mason-Dixon Line.

=== The Big Brick ===
The Big Brick at 11 Beresford Street featured parlors downstairs where clients could partake of brandy and a cigar; the bedrooms upstairs allowed for more intimacy. The privacy afforded by the Big Brick was instrumental in Wade Hampton's successful campaign to be elected as South Carolina governor in 1876. The building served as campaign headquarters and a meeting place for the Charleston Red Shirts that supported Hampton. There they schemed to wrest control of the state government from African Americans and Republicans. Peixotto remained successful at the Big Brick throughout the Reconstruction Era.

== Death ==
At the age of 62, Peixotto died on May 1, 1880, of a stroke. She was quietly buried the next day at Magnolia Cemetery in plot purchased by her husband Jacob Myers. Her death certificate lists her as Mrs. J.S. Myers and her obituary lists her as such.

No evidence has been found suggesting that there was a funeral procession of the magnitude that legend boasts. The only mention of her death is the small obituary on page 4 of the Charleston News & Courier.

Her will as well as probate records made Jacob Myers her executor and clearly indicate that she was "Grace Myers, formerly Grace Peixotto".

As new owner, Jacob Myers continued to rent the "Big Brick" to people who continued to use it as a brothel. The "oldest profession" continued on in operation until the mid-20th century when it was closed by the City of Charleston at the urging of the US Navy.

Raven McDavid wrote that:

One of the lamented institutions of Charleston is the Big Brick, number 11 Beresford Street, so-called because it was made up of large blocks of stone, of cement. The Big Brick, up until 1942 when the Navy, with the usual military gross disregard for local traditions, shut it down, was supposed to be the oldest whorehouse in continuous operation in the Western hemisphere. It had a very select clientele, and it used to pride itself on the dignity and propriety of its young ladies.

In 1996, the edifice at 11 Beresford Street, now 11 Fulton Street, became the headquarters of the Balzac Brothers, importers of coffee.
