= Bordoll =

Brothel in Dortmund, Germany

- Founder: Evelyn Schwarz
- Purpose: Brothel
- Location: Dortmund, Germany
- Products: Sex dolls
- Services: Sex
- Owner: Evelyn Schwarz

Bordoll was a brothel in Dortmund, Germany. The selection of prostitutes provided consisted of entirely sex dolls rather than real people. The brothel was founded in 2017 and has been permanently closed since June 2023.

== Etymology ==
The name Bordoll is a portmanteau of bordello and doll.

== Dolls ==
Bordoll had 13 female dolls and one male. Each weighted 30kg, had a name, and was defined as either "real", "fantasy", "skinny", or "anime". They were imported from Asia and costed the brothel doll £1,786 each.

== Operation ==
Customers can have a session with a doll for about $100 per hour.

The dolls are cleaned and disinfected after every use.
