= Maxim Wien =

Brothel in Vienna

Maxim Wien is one of the oldest and most well known brothels in Vienna, Austria. There are around 20 to 25 women of different nationalities working Maxim Wien at any given time. Maxim is one of the last sex clubs still operational in Vienna. Maxim Wien is known as a "all-in-one club," meaning that it is a strip, sex, and escort club. The club has a sizable reputation and is known among local and international businessmen. There is no entry fee to the club.

== History ==
The predecessor club to Maxim, Planet Girls Paradise was opened in August 1985 by Josef "Pepi" Stern. It was originally a place for variety shows. Josef Stern was known in the industry for operating multiple dance and go-go clubs in Austria and Croatia. Currently, he is responsible for operating the Monaco Bar, as well as the current Maxim club. On July 5, 2005, the new Maxim was reopened by Stern under the name Maxim Wien. At the time, many of the women who worked in Maxim were students who wanted to earn money while they were on their summer vacations.

In January 2017, Maxim Wien introduced a new BDSM room which is equipped with tools for patrons to experience BDSM with a dominatrix. The club regularly hires professional dominatrices.

In 2018, Maxim Wien closed for few months for renovations. Despite the club's closure, many employees did not seek employment at other establishments. They resumed working at Maxim Wien once the renovations were complete.

== Operation ==
Maxim is separated into two parts; a downstairs bar and lounge area and an upstairs area where the rooms are located. The lounge area has music played by a resident DJ, a stage featuring dancers, and an area for patrons to socialize with available women. The bar offers various alcoholic drinks. Patrons are permitted to buy drinks for the working women.

After a patron makes a deal with one of the Maxim women, the patron and the worker proceed to a private room in the upstairs location. The rooms in Maxim Wien are decorated different styles. The room types include regular rooms, VIP rooms, and an equipped BDSM room. Patrons provide payment before the session begins, including payment for agreed upon elective services.

Maxim Wien, as an established club, is considered as an acceptable establishment for women who are entering the paid sex industry. The club regularly employees women who have recently begun careers in sex work. Maxim Wien helps women complete the steps necessary to start working legally in the sex industry in Vienna.

== Events ==
Maxim Wien hosts numerous events throughout the year. Most of these events are themed and have high attendance. Some of the events that have been held in the brothel include:

- Maxim Playboy Party
- Maxim Poker Night
- Spring Awakening
- Sex in the City
- Eurovision Showcontest
- Maxim Rap Battles
- Miss Maxim contests

The Series of Maxim Rap Battle was the first event in the world where a rap battle was organized in a brothel.

Maxim has also hosted various charity events throughout the years, such as their Neighbor in Need, Lions Club Maria Theresia and other similar events.

In addition to these events that are held in the brothel, the club offers three themed parties: Bachelor party, Birthday party and Divorce party.

== Celebrity guests ==
Maxim has been visited by celebrities, including, Niki Lauda, Rebbie Jackson, Alexander Wussow, Percy Sledge, as well as famous bands like The Platters, Inner Circle and Falco, with his former band Acid.

In addition to celebrities, many adult film starts have also made an appearance at Maxim Wien. Carla Cox, Little Caprice, Mia Anderson and Janet Joy have visited the club at least once, among others.

== Partners ==
Maxim Wien is in partnership with Bar Schönbrunn and the Escort Girls Vienna Escort Agency.

=== Bar Schönbrunn ===
Bar Schönbrunn is another brothel located at Schönbrunner Schlossstrasse 46. This bar is among the oldest in the city and is located near Schönbrunn Palace. This bar is smaller compared to Maxim, with only four rooms available for patrons. Women who work at Maxim Wien may also periodically work at Bar Schönbrunn.

=== Escort Girls Vienna ===
Escort Girls Vienna (also known as EGV) is the official escort agency of Maxim Wien. Patrons who wish to book Maxim women for a hotel or home escort visit can do so through this agency. Maxim workers who work as escorts can be booked via the agency.

== See also ==
- Prostitution in Austria

== Discussion about Maxim Wien in Erotic Forums ==
Maxim Wien has its own thread in almost all of the biggest Erotic Forums:

- International Sex Guide - Vienna
- Erotikforum.at (German)
- Sex in Vienna Forum

== Sources ==
- Sommernacktparty im Varieté MAXIM Wien (German)
- SPÖ geht jetzt in Wiener Sex-Sauna auf Stimmenfang (German)
- Rotlicht in Wien und der Welt - Monacobar braucht die Taxis und hat Geschäftsidee
- Hitlers "Horch" fuhr in Wien vor (Maxim Variete Wien) (German)
- Rotlichtbaron aus Wien in Kroatien um Luxusvilla gebracht (German)
- Josef Stern will durchstarten – Zeitung "Österreich" hilft (German)
- Maxim Wien Review 2019
- Best Brothels of Vienna
