= Silver Cross Tavern =

Pub on Whitehall, London

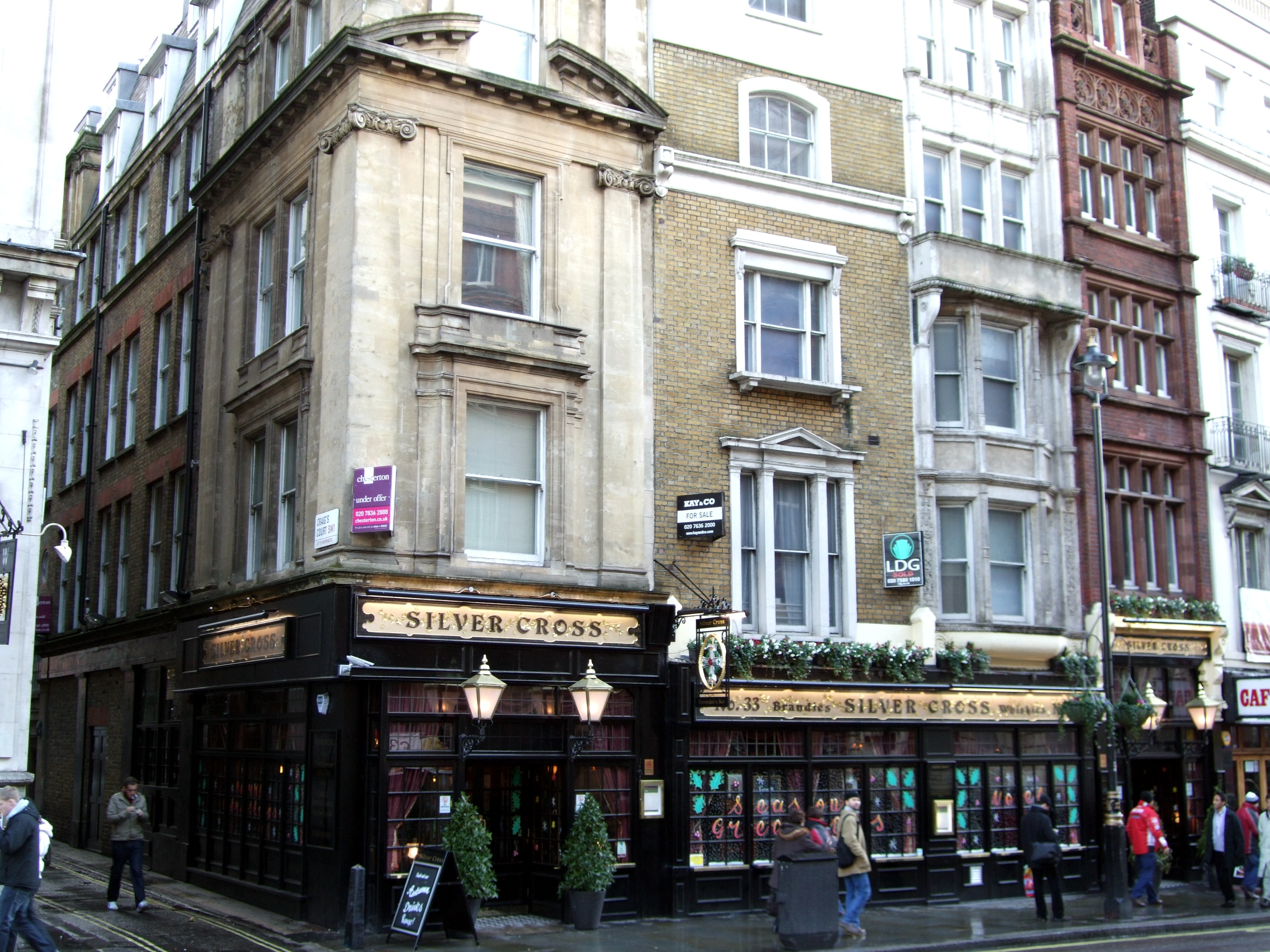
- Façade of the Silver Cross Tavern
- Interactive map of the Silver Cross Tavern area
- Former names: "The Garter"

General information
- Type: Pub
- Location: Whitehall, London, England
- Coordinates: 51°30′23″N 0°07′37″W
- Completed: 13th century
- Opened: 1674
- Owner: Taylor Walker Pubs

The Silver Cross Tavern is a pub on Whitehall in London, England. It was first opened as a licensed pub in 1674. The building had been an establishment at that location since the 13th century. It has been argued to be the only theoretically legal (albeit non-operating) brothel in the country, on the grounds that a 17th-century royal licence on the building was never revoked.

== History ==
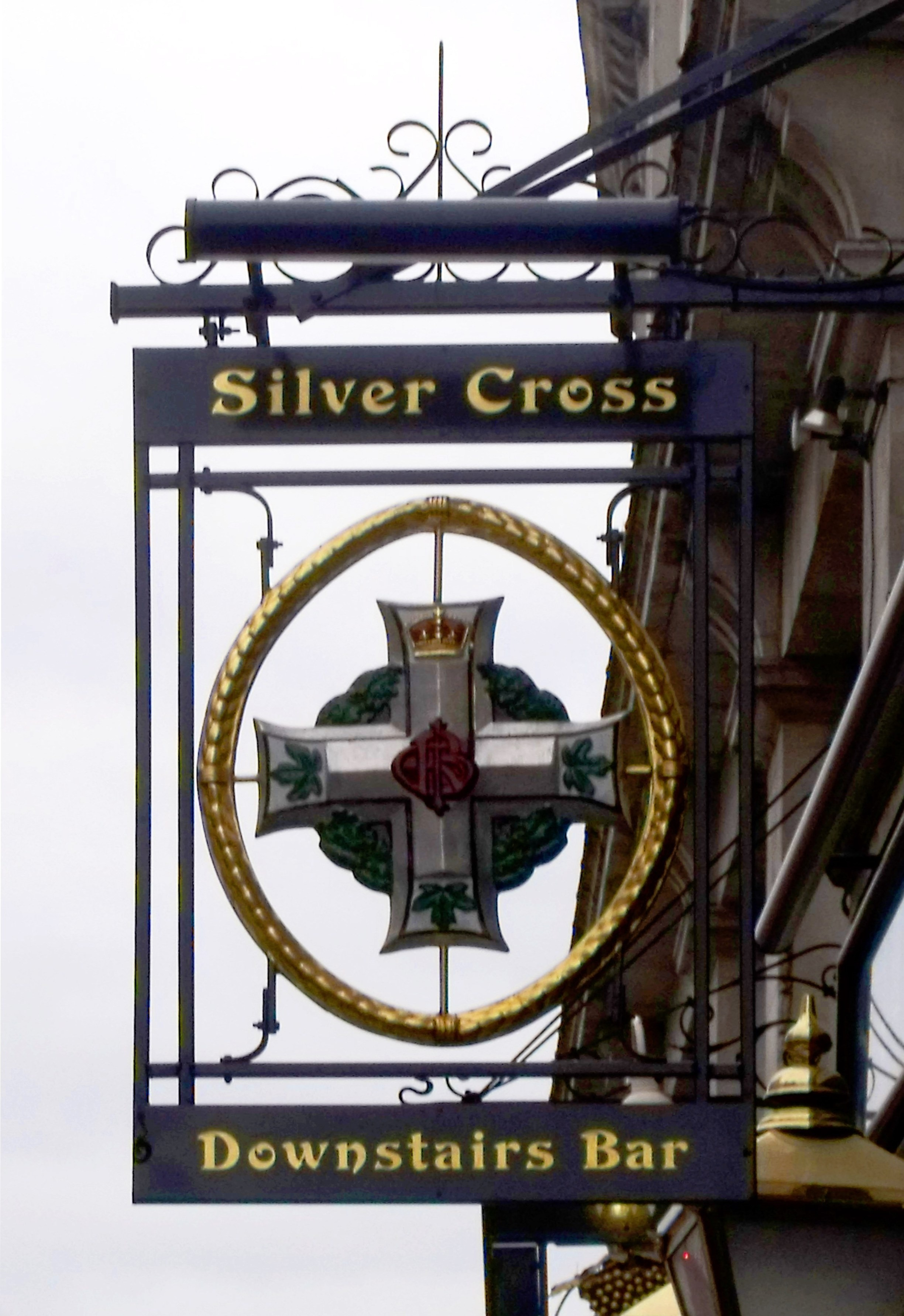
The Tavern's sign

The Silver Cross Tavern was first licensed and opened as a pub in 1674 as "The Garter" after having been a licensed brothel beforehand. It was initially owned by William Waad, son of politician Sir William Waad, who sold it to Joseph Craig in its first licensed year. Craig had also bought a number of buildings near the Silver Cross Tavern; however, the Silver Cross was not incorporated with the other buildings which became known as Craig's Court.

The pub was subsequently acquired by the Earls of Harrington. In 1861, it was leased from the Earl of Harrington by the Earl of St Vincent, being referred to as The Silver Cross. In the twentieth century, the pub was owned by TJ Bernard, who sold it to Taylor Walker Pubs. Because of its location near British government buildings and Trafalgar Square, the pub is frequented by members of the Civil Service and tourists.

In 1999, the BBC claimed that the Silver Cross Tavern was the only legal brothel in the United Kingdom, although not currently in operation as such, on the basis that a royal licence granted by Charles I was never revoked.

== Building ==
A building on the site that was part of St Katherine's Hermitage was initially constructed in the thirteenth century with lead-lined walls. The tavern has undergone a number of rebuilds, with the last occurring in 1900. The pub has a wagon vaulted ceiling. Shortly after opening, the pub had a plaster ceiling installed in the bar area when King Charles I lived in Whitehall.

In the Victorian era, the building had a new façade built. It was subsequently renumbered as 37 Whitehall and is the red tiled façade building at the far right or west end of the structures from Craig's Court. In the 1990s, the pub was expanded into numbers 33–35 which themselves had been combined by previous occupiers, the last after the pizza restaurant next door was closed and the pub took over the premises.
