= LGBTQ culture in Tokyo =

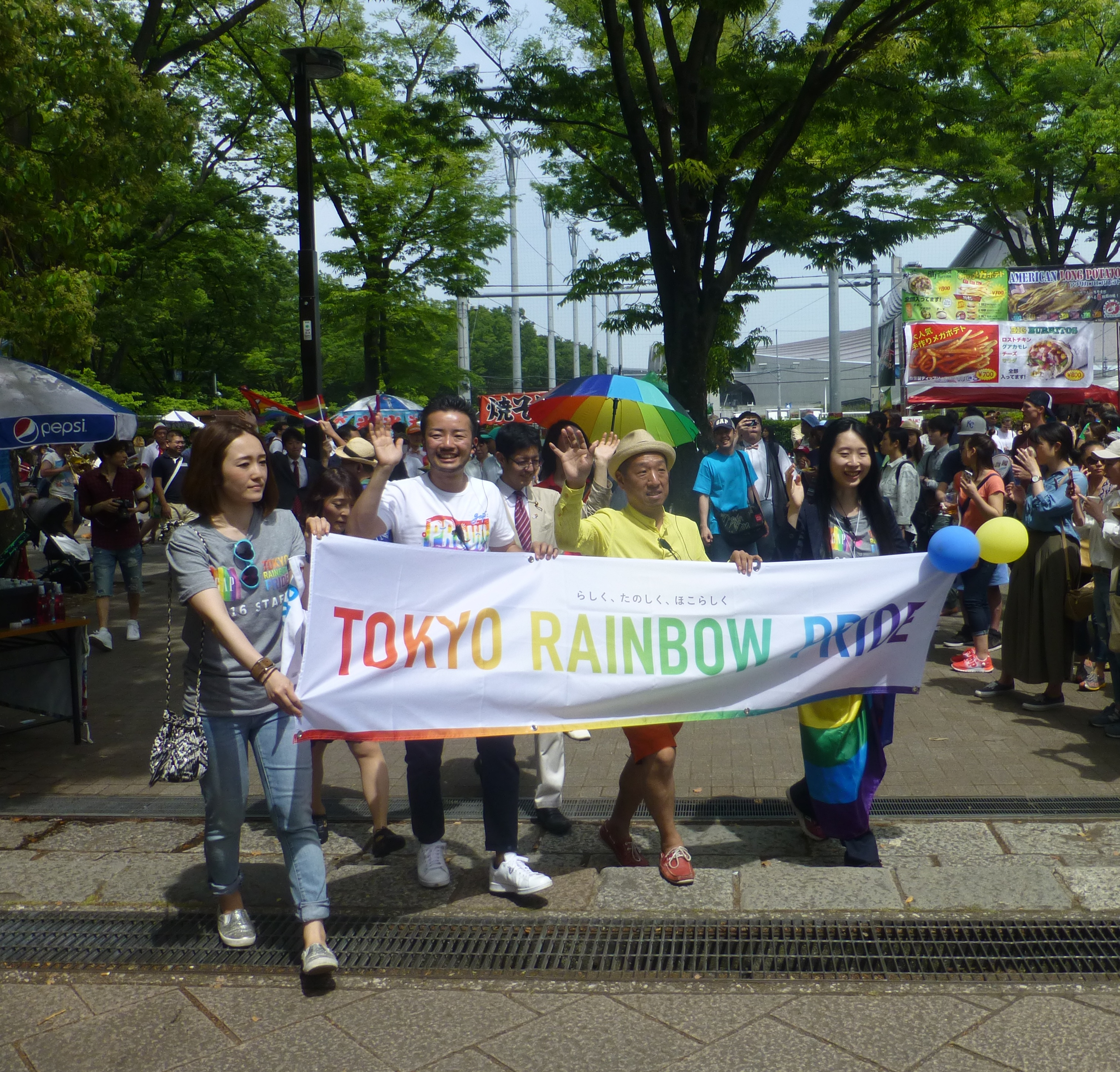
Tokyo Rainbow Pride in 2016.

The LGBTQ community in Tokyo is one of the largest in Asia. While Japan does not assign as much moral or social weight to sexuality as in the West, it is still difficult for Japanese people to come out in society as being LGBT; the community reportedly experiences homophobia even amongst those in the community. Only 5% of Japanese people report they know somebody who is LGBT.

There is a community in Japan called Stonewall that aims to serve the LGBT community, with many local chapters spread across Japan. Stonewall provides educational awareness, useful information, communicative online platforms, and fellowship opportunities.

== History ==
=== American occupation of Japan (1945–1952) ===
The gay neighborhood of Ni-chōme, Tokyo, came into existence following the rapid societal changes following the American occupation of Japan. It features strong ties to the red-light district.

Following this, places for the LGBT community slowly began to open throughout Japan. In 1948, a gay tea shop opened in Shinjuku; in the 1950s, the first gay bar was called Yanagi (Japanese: やなぎ).

=== Gay Bars (1960–1980) ===
By the 1960s, the number of gay bars throughout Ni-chōme and all throughout Tokyo had begun to expand to about fifty. In 1973, Kikōshi (Japanese: 貴公子; lit. 'young noble'), Roppongi, Tokyo, was the country's first onabe (or "masculine lesbian") bar.

=== Development of LGBT societies (1989–2011) ===
In 1988, participants from the Japan Exchange and Teaching Programme formed 'A Terribly Apropos Gay Organisation.', or ATAGO, for the ad-hoc nature of its first meeting. While initially only for gay people, the organisation renamed itself to ATAGLO to include lesbians. ATAGLO helped LGBT and JET participants initially by producing a newsletter, Between the Sheets, a directory for couch-surfing, and mentoring and counselling.

After a youth recreation house in Fuchū began excluding LGBT members, the OCCUR (アカー, akā) group began legal proceedings against it in 1990.

In 1994, members of Gayjet, another group which eventually merged with ATAGLO, expressed their concern with CLAIR, the Council of Local Authorities for International Relations, for censoring and discriminating LGBT+ voices within the community The now-merged ATAGLO started to work on a proposal so that they could become Special Interest Group (SIG) of AJET, a sub-organisation handling support and communities. The purpose of this group was to be in publications, become more aware in the media, building relationships with LGBT+ and JET members. Then, Gayjet created a proposal which collected 450 signatures of people that supported them.

In 1995, the group renamed themselves Stonewall, as CLAIR stated they would stop funding AJET if the word "Gay" was in an organisation's name. After the suggestion of regional leaders in 2008, the organisation underwent structural change in 2011, becoming more separate. This seemed to create distance between them and AJET, who contacted Stonewall to rebuild AJET's LGBT social group. In May 2011, 10 original JET participants helped to create new leadership roles for the roughly 120 members, and reinforce Stonewall as part of AJET under the name Stonewall Japan. A constitution and formal roles were drawn up, and Stonewall claims to have over 2000 members in 2020.

Later in 2014, the organization wanted to change the name to 'Life as a Gay JET' then to 'Life as a GLBT JET' then to 'Life as an LGBT Jet in Japan'.

In 2011, AJET and Stonewall became distant from each other, and their relationship dwindled down. However, an AJET rep contacted a Stonewall member to see if they wanted to help rebuild AJET's LGBT social group for them. So, in May 2011, 10 people that participated from JET helped to create new leadership roles and rebrand 'Stonewall Ajet'. They continued to have meetings to make changes to the organization. Because of the rise in participants, Stonewall AJET became an organization due to the amount of help they received. Since establishing this new organization, they since they created a President, Vice President, Web Coordinator, Event Coordinator, and Block Leaders.

=== Pride Parade (1994) ===
In 1994, Japan had its first pride parade for gays and lesbians, and it opened its first gay community center called ATKA.

=== Gay Bars and Clubs (2010–present) ===
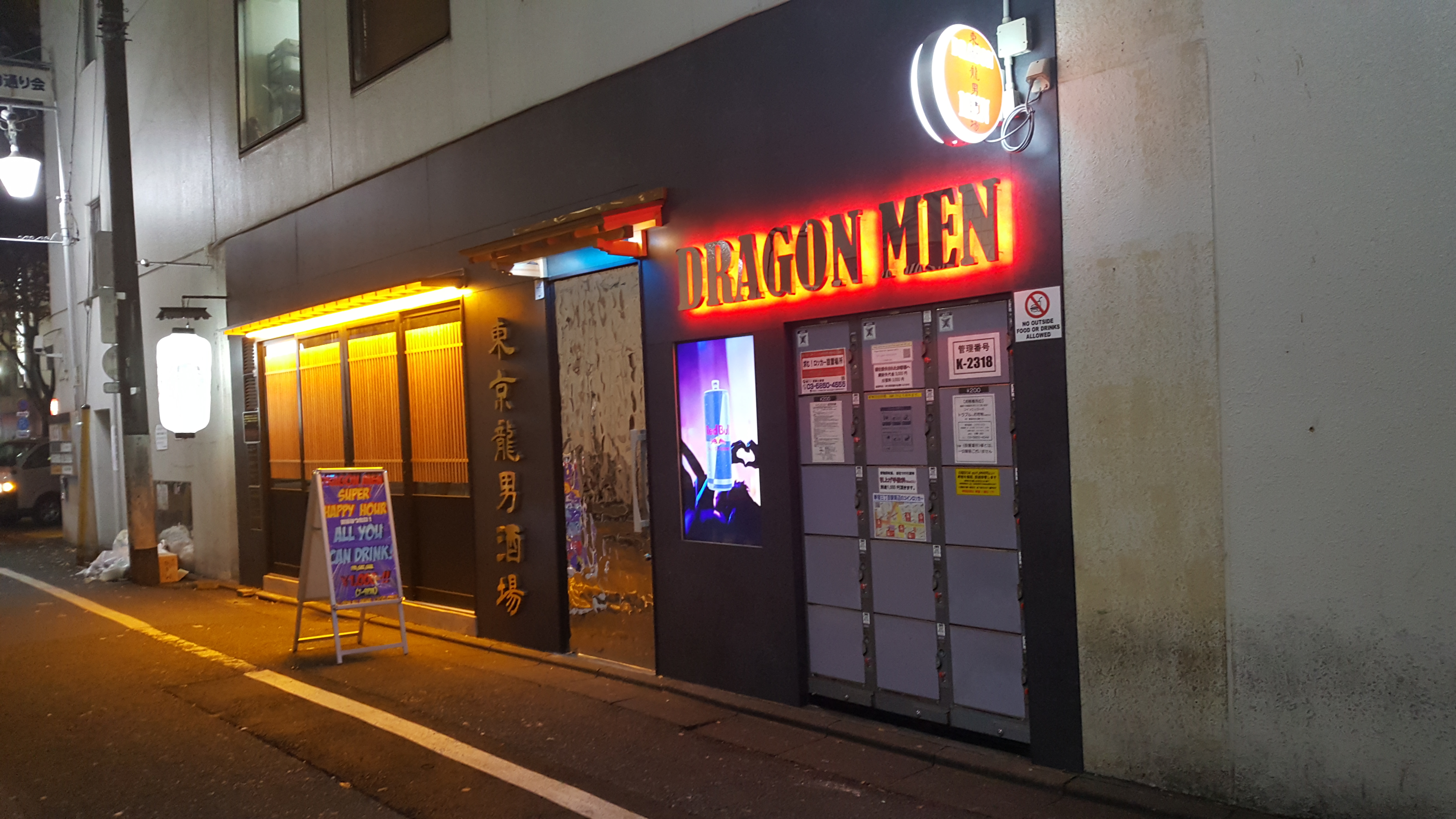
Exterior of the gay bar Dragon Men in 2019

In 2010, there was a decline of gay clubs and bars by a third due to construction near the Fukutoshin line increasing value in the area. Then, on August 17, 2012, it was banned to dance in clubs in Ni-chōme which is a popular district in Tokyo for the LGBT community. Establishments include Aiiro Cafe and Dragon Men.

=== Tokyo-wide same sex unions ===
In 2021 the government of Tokyo announced it would begin to offer legal unions for same sex romantic couples.

== Geography ==
Most LGBT institutions in Tokyo are in Shinjuku Ni-chōme. As of 2010 there are about 300 gay bars in this community.

Tokyo's gay scene is not limited to Ni-chōme. A number of other areas, such as Ueno, Asakusa, Shimbashi, and Ikebukuro, have conglomerations of gay bars, although none as dense as in Ni-chōme. Information about these bars, bookstores, sex shops, and cruising spots can be found in the Otoko-machi Map (Boy's Town Map), a country-wide guide to Japanese gay establishments, or in monthly gay magazines like G-men and Badi. Tokyo also has a great number of gay "circles" including LGBT sports teams, cultural groups, and religious groups.

The number of gay bars in 2013 (Lesbian bar not included)

- Shinjuku Total – 297
  - Shinjuku ni-chōme – 291
  - Kabukicho – 4
  - Nishi-Shinjuku – 2
- Ueno – 95
- Asakusa – 67
- Shinbashi – 66
- Ikebukuro – 21
- Shibuya – 8
- Nakano – 6

Reference：Doyama(Osaka)-154, Sakae(Nagoya)-63, Fukuoka-62, Namba(Osaka)-42, Noge(Yokohama)-37, Susukino(Sapporo)-32, Nagarekawa (Hiroshima)-30, Sakurazaka(Okinawa)-26, Shinsekai(Osaka)-25

The number of gay-related businesses: Bar, nightclub, host club, cruising box, sauna, gay book and video store, etc. (Lesbian bars not included)

- Shinjuku Total – 460
  - Shinjuku ni-chōme – 402 (Bar-274, host clubs-17, Delivery health/Fashion health-28, Gay bathhouse & cruising boxes-15)
  - Nishi-Shinjuku – 18
  - Kabukicho – 17
  - North Shinjuku / Okubo – 14
  - Yoyogi (Shinjuku Station south exit) – 9
- Ueno – 123
- Asakusa – 80
- Shinbashi – 74
- Ikebukuro – 37
- Nakano – 25
- Shibuya – 15

== Institutions ==
Regumi (Japanese: レズビアン組; rōmaji: Rezubian-gumi; lit. 'lesbian group') is a lesbian group in Tokyo. The use of the abbreviation regumi avoids using the word "lesbian" (レスビアン resubian or レズビアン rezubian) and its abbreviation rezu (レズ), which in Japanese is derogatory. The short version for regumi is rezi, which is an insulting term in Japanese.

The Tokyo Gay and Lesbian Deaf Rainbow Alliance, or the Tokyo Lesbian and Gay Deaf Community (TLGDC), is in the city. Taski Tade, who was a member of this group, conducted an interview that was translated into English.

OCCUR has an English name that does not directly indicate that it is an LGBT group.

== Recreation ==
As of 2012 there are two gay pride parades in Tokyo: Tokyo Rainbow Pride (TRP) and Tokyo Pride.

In 1994 the International Lesbian, Gay, Bisexual, Trans and Intersex Association (ILGA) began organizing the Tokyo Pride Parade, originally named the Tokyo Lesbian & Gay Parade (TL&GP); it was Japan's first gay pride parade. The event received its current name in 2007. The parade had a hiatus from 2008, ending in 2010. It had another hiatus in 2011. In 2010 Antoni Slodowski of Reuters wrote that "Although the number of participants in the parade is on the rise, it is a small crowd in a city of 12.8 million people and the event is relatively small even by Asian standards."

In May 2011 Tokyo Rainbow Pride was created. The organizers created it to ensure that a gay pride parade would be held in Tokyo in the event Tokyo Pride could not be held. Akie Abe attended Tokyo Rainbow Pride in 2012. Rainbow Pride is a part of Rainbow Week (東京レインボーウィーク Tōkyō Reinbōwīku).

=== Tokyo Rainbow Pride ===
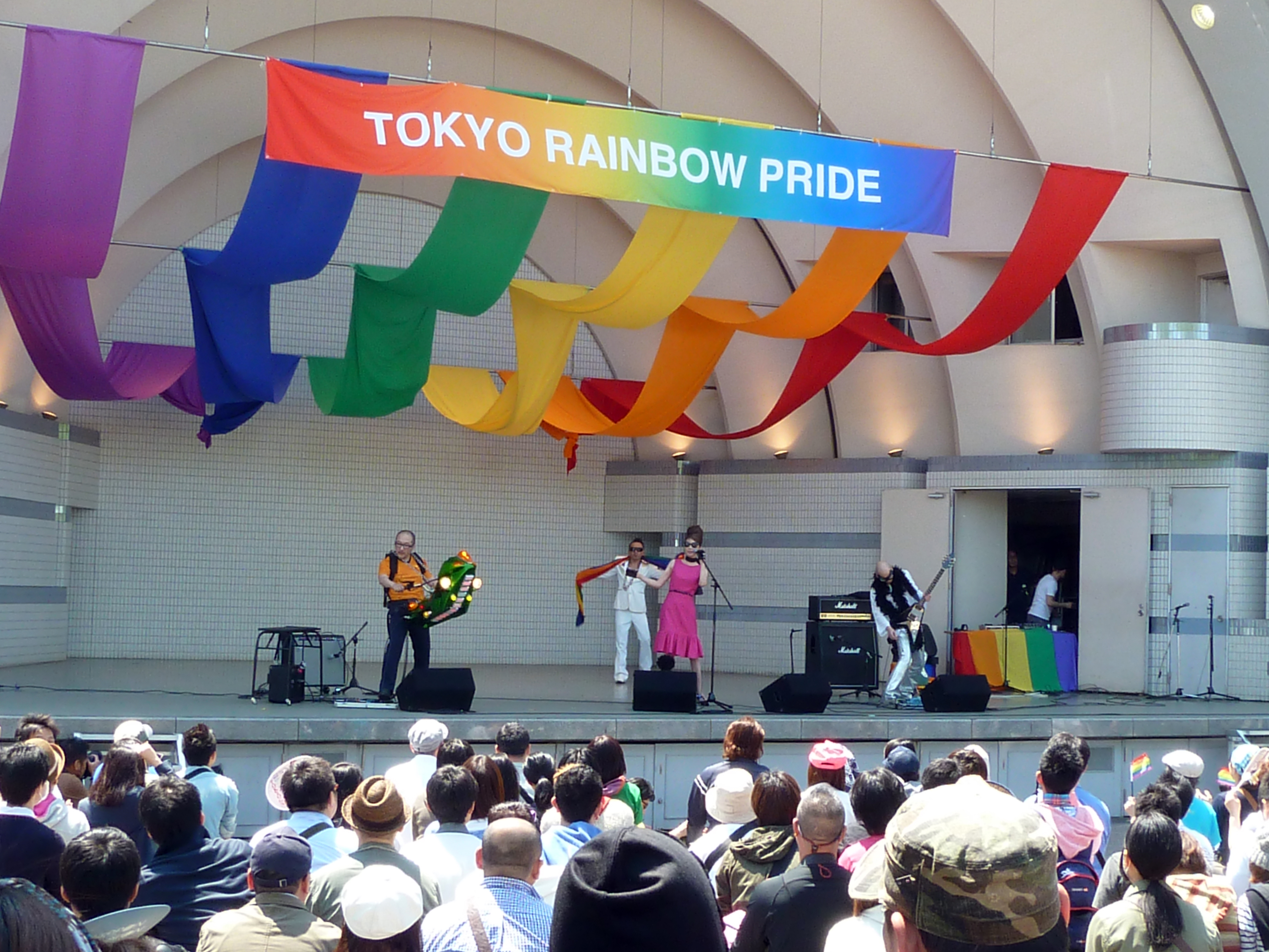
Tokyo Rainbow Pride, 2013

Rainbow week of TRP 2017 was held from April 29 to May 7. Parade took place on May 7, 2017. Free Tea Dance at Wall&Wall Omotesando. Event info at Tokyo Rainbow Pride website.

The parade in 2020 was cancelled due to the COVID-19 pandemic in Tokyo.

In 2022, the parade returned for the first time in three years. However, it occurred on a limited scale, as the 2020 and 2021 editions of the parade were cancelled due to the COVID-19 pandemic in Tokyo.

In 2023, the parade returned in full for the first time in four years.

== Media ==
Many male artists have been coming out of the closet and speaking publicly about being gay on talk shows and other TV programs in Tokyo. With being famous, there comes a lot of talk on sexuality. There are two pop culture critics that are examples of being gay and coming out.

Some celebrities use being LGBT to get more attention from the media. One comedian, Masaki Sumitani, rose to fame by wearing promiscuous clothing. He wore a leather harness, cap, and boots. By him thrusting while wearing this outfit had his fans screaming for him.

In 1975, there were twelve women that were one of the first people to come out and label themselves as lesbians. They were published in a magazine called Subarashi Onna.

There are two notable transgender celebrities, Ai Haruna and Ayana Tsubaki, who are Japanese celebrities that became well known from popular TV shows. In 2011, a fashion model by the name of Hiromi came out as a lesbian to the public.

== Notable residents ==
- Aya Kamikawa (transgender politician in Setagaya ward)

== See also ==
- Kagemachaya (陰間茶屋, Japanese gay bar)
- LGBT culture in Japan
- LGBT rights in Tokyo
- LGBT rights in Japan
- Homosexuality in Japan
