= Entertainment district =

Area with a high concentration of entertainment venues

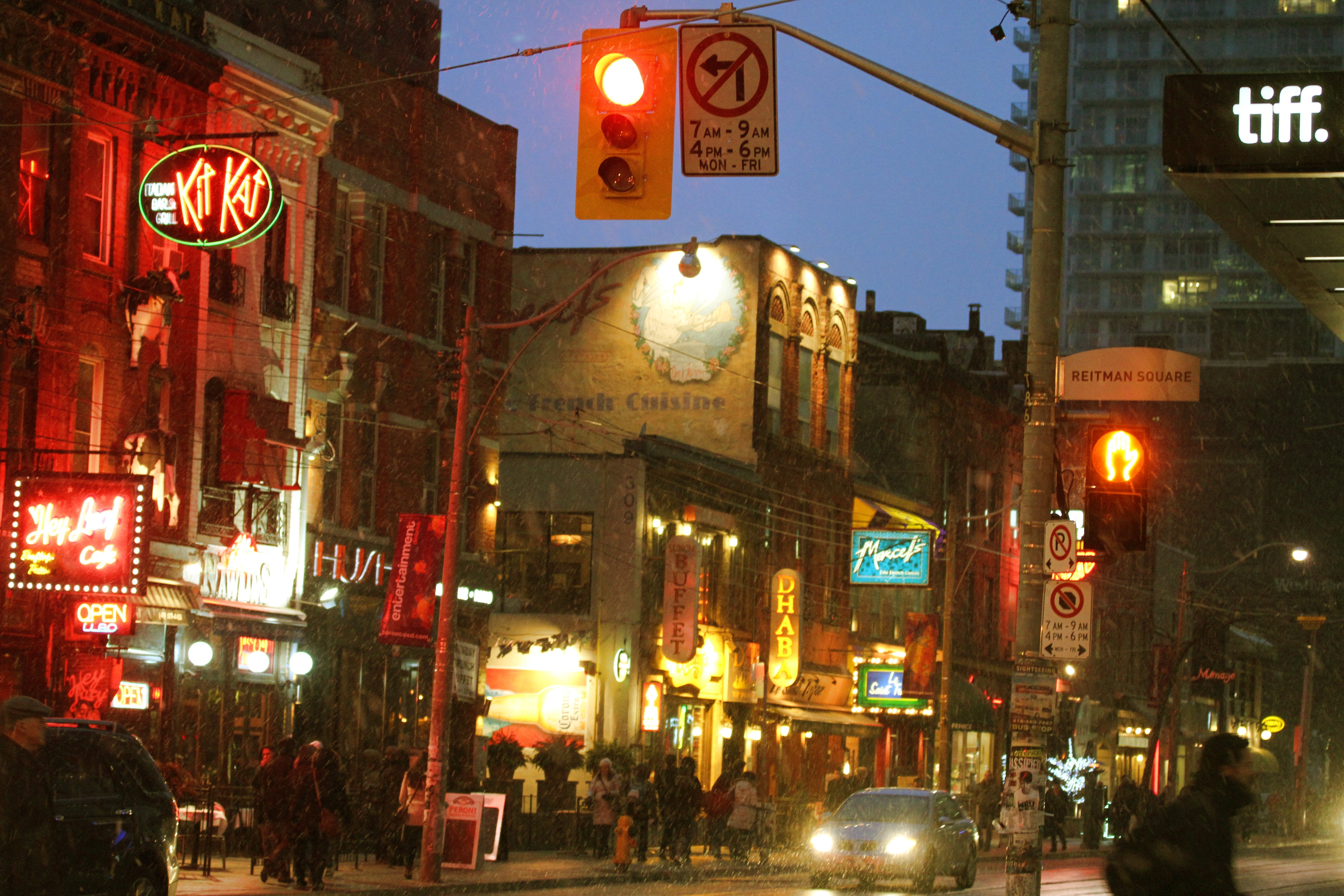
The entertainment district in Toronto

An entertainment district is a type of arts district with a high concentration of movie theaters, theatres or other entertainment venues. Such areas may be officially designated by local governments with functional zoning regulations, as well as public and private investment in distinctive urban design.

== Partial list of entertainment districts ==
- Las Vegas Strip, Las Vegas, Nevada
- Broadway (Nashville, Tennessee), Nashville, Tennessee
- Beale Street, Memphis, Tennessee
- Bourbon Street, New Orleans, Louisiana
- San Antonio River Walk, San Antonio, Texas
- 17 Avenue SW, Calgary, Canada
- Quartier des Spectacles, Montreal, Canada
- Calgary Entertainment District, Canada
- South Edmonton Common, Canada
- Ice District, Edmonton, Alberta
- Old Strathcona, Edmonton, Alberta
- Granville Entertainment District, Vancouver
- Hohenzollernring, Cologne
- St. Pauli with Reeperbahn, Hamburg, Germany
- Bermudadreieck, Bochum, Germany
- Toronto Entertainment District, Canada
- Te Aro Entertainment District, Wellington, New Zealand
- Soho, London, England
- The O2, London, England
- Bukit Bintang, Kuala Lumpur, Malaysia
- Blok M, Jakarta, Indonesia
- Kings Cross, Sydney, Australia
- Kabukichō, Tokyo, Japan
- Akihabara, Tokyo, Japan
- Shibuya, Tokyo, Japan
- Ikebukuro, Tokyo, Japan
- Shinjuku Ni-chōme, Tokyo, Japan
- Shinsaibashi, Osaka, Japan
- Sōemonchō, Osaka, Japan
- Amerikamura, Osaka, Japan
- Umeda, Osaka, Japan
- Dōyama-chō, Osaka, Japan
- Susukino, Sapporo, Japan
- Lan Kwai Fong, Hong Kong

== Cause and effects of entertainment districts ==
Entertainment districts have economically helped downtowns and cities thrive through development of various businesses that attract tourism and commerce. As entertainment districts tend to create crowds, facilitation and management by police is required to promote safety and regulation. The main source that requires police interaction in the entertainment districts are the nightclubs and bars that may promote intoxication and lead to miscreant behavior. Police and security deal with behavior consisting of bar fights, overcrowding, and public urination. The requirement of regulation and maintenance of these areas are important for the safety of the individuals utilizing and benefiting from the entertainment districts.

== See also ==
- Amusement park
- Urban vitality
