= Sexuality in Japan =

Sexuality in Japan developed separately from that of mainland Asia, as Japan did not adopt the Confucian view of marriage, in which chastity is highly valued. Monogamy in marriage is often thought to be less important in Japan, and sometimes married men may seek pleasure from courtesans. Prostitution in Japan has a long history, and became especially popular during the Japanese economic miracle, as evening entertainments were tax-deductible. Decreased sex drive in the 21st century has been blamed for the low Japanese birth rate and declining growth of the Japanese population.

== Pornography ==
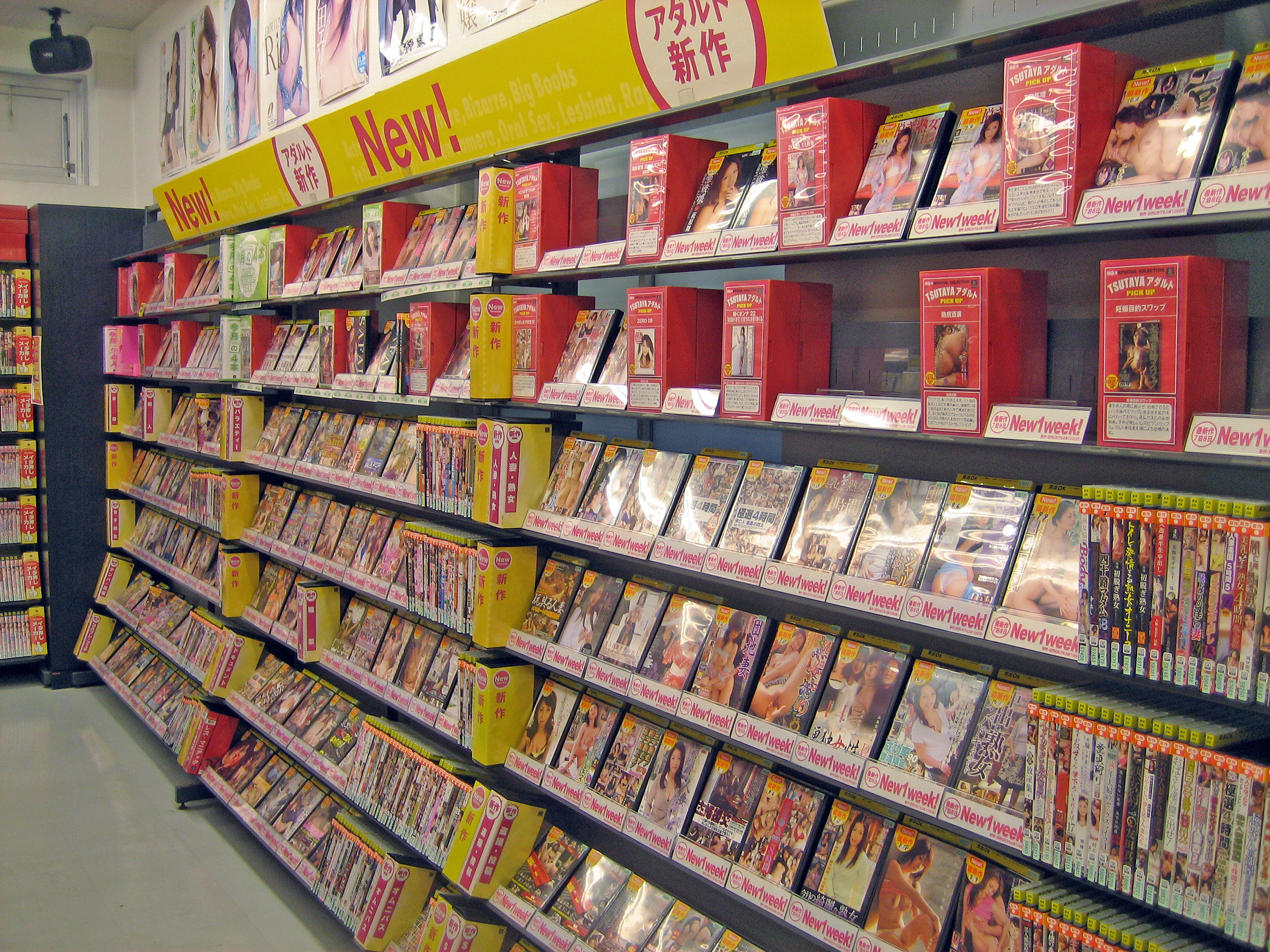
Adult videos in a Japanese rental shop, 2008

Arguably mass-produced pornography in Japan may have begun as early as the Edo period (1603–1868), as erotic artwork referred to as shunga that was typically produced with woodblock prints in the 1,000's. These erotic images were declared obscene and banned in 1772 by the Tokugawa shogunate, although they continued to be produced underground in smaller numbers. Between the 1920s and 1930s in Japan there was a literary and artistic movement known as ero guro which focused on eroticism, sexual corruption and decadence. Softcore pornographic theatrical films known as pink films dominated the domestic cinema in Japan from the mid-1960s through the mid-1980s.

In contemporary times Japanese pornography has gained a worldwide following and is frequently translated and exported to other cultures because of its large spectrum of themes and media. Pornography in Japan has in recent times expanded into new mediums such as video games (eroge) manga and animation (hentai) in addition to the more common film and historic mediums.

=== Shunga ===
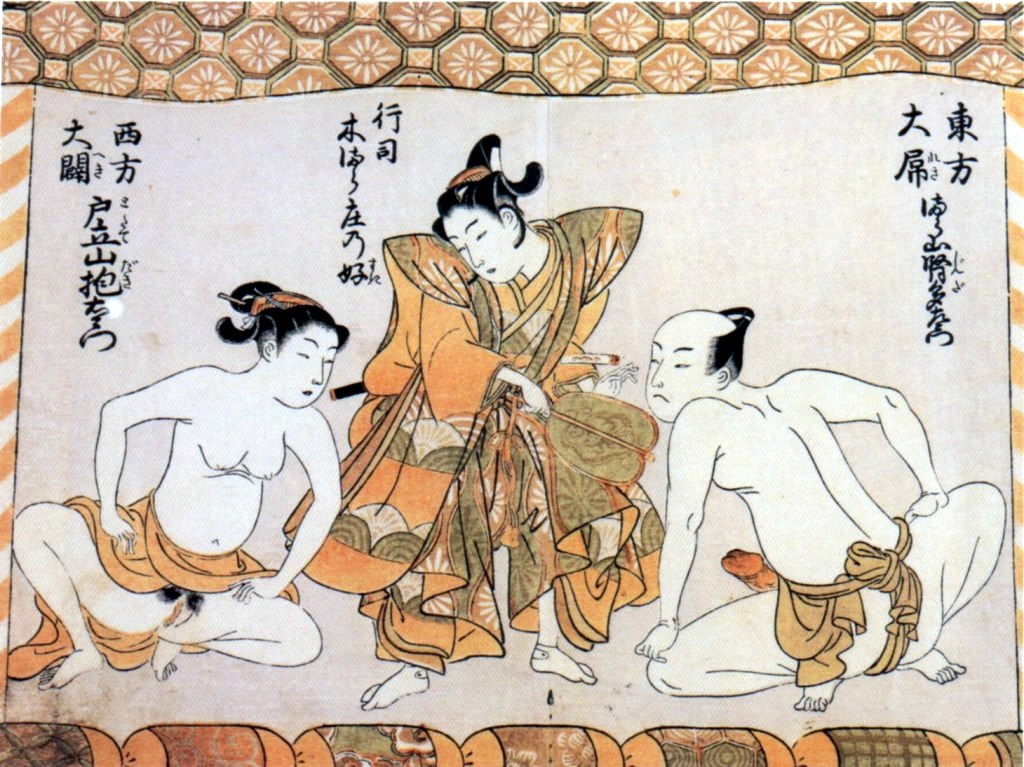
A shunga woodblock print from 1772 depicting a man and a woman engaging in an erotic wrestling match with a second woman acting as a referee

Most shunga are a type of ukiyo-e, the main artistic genre of woodblock printing in Japan. Although scarce, there are however extant erotic painted handscrolls which predate the Ukiyo-e movement. Translated literally, the Japanese word shunga means picture of spring; "spring" being a common euphemism for sex in Japan.

The ukiyo-e movement as a whole sought to express an idealisation of contemporary urban life and appeal to the new chōnin class. Following the aesthetics of everyday life, Edo period shunga varied widely in its depictions of sexuality. In the Edo period it was enjoyed by rich and poor, men and women, despite being out of favour with the shogunate. Almost all ukiyo-e artists made shunga at some point in their careers, and it did not detract from their prestige as artists. Classifying shunga as a kind of medieval pornography can be misleading in this respect.

=== Film ===
In the years since the end of World War II, eroticism has gradually made its way into Japanese cinema. The first kiss to be seen in Japanese film—discreetly half-hidden by an umbrella—caused a national sensation in 1946. Foreign films throughout the 1950s introduced female nudity into international cinema and were imported to Japan without problem. Nevertheless, until the early 1960s, graphic depictions of nudity and sex in Japanese film could only be seen in single-reel "stag films," made illegally by underground film producers such as those depicted in Imamura's film The Pornographers (1966).

Mainstream pornography did not arrive in Japan until the advent of Pink film. Pink film was theatrical film which featured soft core, suggestive themes and later full-on nudity and sexual acts. The first wave of the Pink film in Japan was contemporary with the similar U.S. sexploitation film genres, the "nudie-cuties" and "roughies". Nudity and sex officially entered Japanese cinema with Satoru Kobayashi's controversial and popular independent production Flesh Market (Nikutai no Ichiba, 1962), which is considered the first true pink film. In the 1970s, some of Japan's major studios, facing the loss of their theatrical audience, took over the pink film. With their access to higher production-values and talent, some of these films became critical and popular successes. When ownership of VCRs first became widespread in the early 1980s, AVs (adult videos) made their appearance and quickly became highly popular. As early as 1982 the AVs had already attained an approximately equal share of the adult entertainment market with theatrical erotic films. Since then the market for pink films has decreased tremendously and a majority of Japanese seeking pornography go to AVs.

Although the pink film genre has declined dramatically since the advent of AVs on VCR the genre is significant in that it paved the way for true pornography in Japan as well as for multiple other genres of Japanese pornographic film including: hamedori, roshutsu, and Japanese bondage. Other Japanese pornography genres include: group sex (with gang bang as a subgenre), lesbian, and fetishes (particularly foot fetishes). Lotion play is a popular element in Japanese pornography.

=== Hentai and seijin manga (adult cartoons) ===
The genre of erotica known to the West as hentai (erotic cartoons or drawings) was invented in Japan; They are used in erotic manga (Japanese comic books, graphic novels) and anime (Japanese animation). The word "hentai" has a negative connotation in Japanese and usually means "sexually perverted", with those in Japan more often referring to hentai as "seijin" or "adult" manga/anime.

The adult manga/anime medium carries its own distinct subgenres as well. Futanari or sexual attraction to androgynous people is an extensive subgenre of seijin manga. Bakunyū is the subgenre that features females with very large breasts. In Japan lolicon refers to an attraction to underage girls. Outside Japan lolicon generally refers to the genre of seijin manga wherein childlike female characters are depicted in an erotic manner. Lolicon's male equivalent, shotacon is similarly used in the West to refer to the genre of manga and anime in which pre-pubescent or pubescent male characters are depicted in a suggestive or erotic manner.

=== International reception ===
Japanese pornography has gained a worldwide following and is frequently translated and exported to other cultures because of its large spectrum of themes and media.

However, critics state that the lolicon genre of seijin manga, wherein childlike females are depicted in an erotic way, contributes to sexual abuse of children. Several countries have attempted to criminalize lolicon's sexually explicit forms as a type of child pornography, Canada, Australia, New Zealand, Sweden, the Philippines and Ireland are among those that have done so.

== Prostitution ==
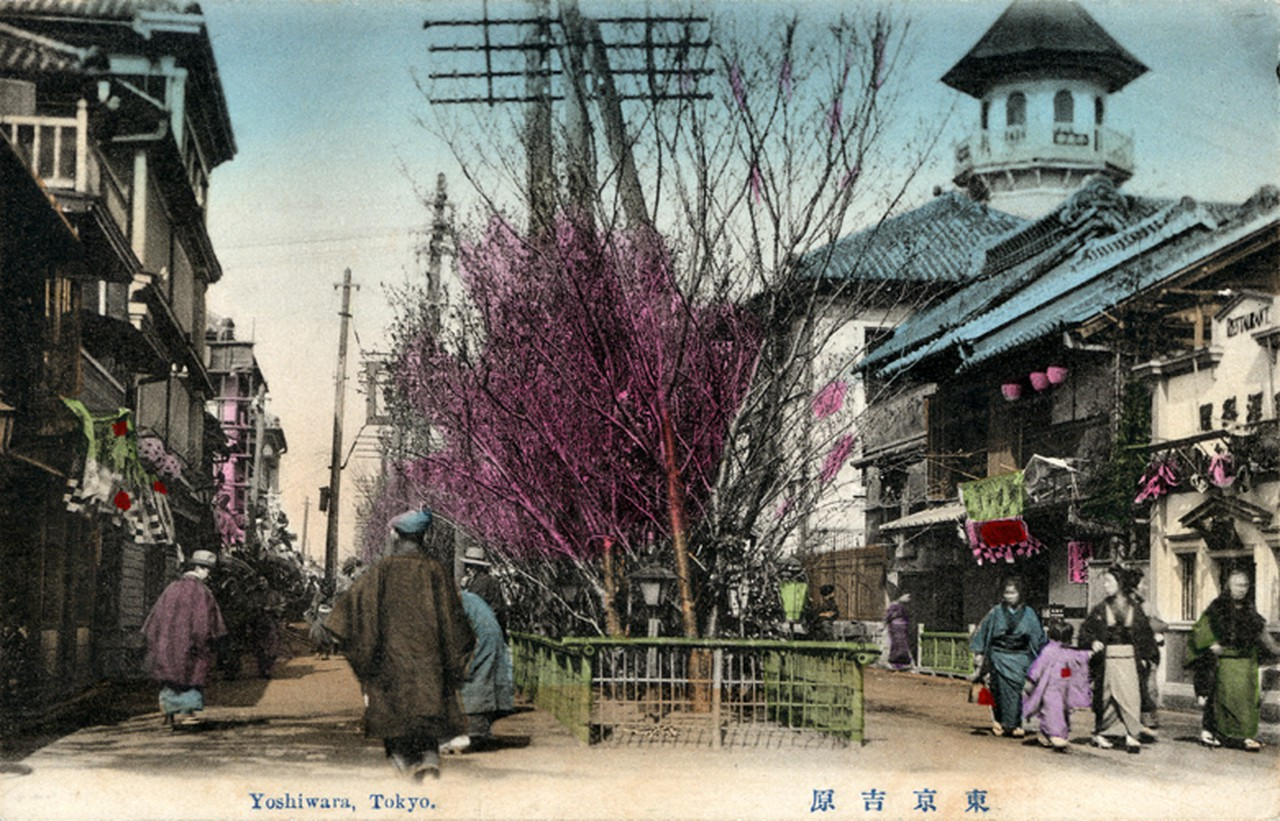
An antique postcard of Tokyo's Yoshiwara, a historic district famous for its prostitution

Prostitution has existed in some form throughout Japan's history. Despite the Anti-Prostitution Law of 1956, various legal loopholes, liberal interpretations of the law, and loose enforcement have allowed the sex industry to prosper and earn an estimated 2.3 trillion yen a year. Notably, the Anti-Prostitution Law makes prostituting oneself a crime whereas those who use the services of a prostitute are immune from prosecution.

In Japan, the "sex industry" is not synonymous with prostitution. Because Japanese law defines prostitution as "intercourse with an unspecified person in exchange for payment," in order to remain legal, most sex clubs offer only non-coital services. This has led Joan Sinclair, the author of Pink Box, to observe that the sex industry in Japan ironically "offer[s] absolutely everything imaginable but sex."

=== Geisha ===
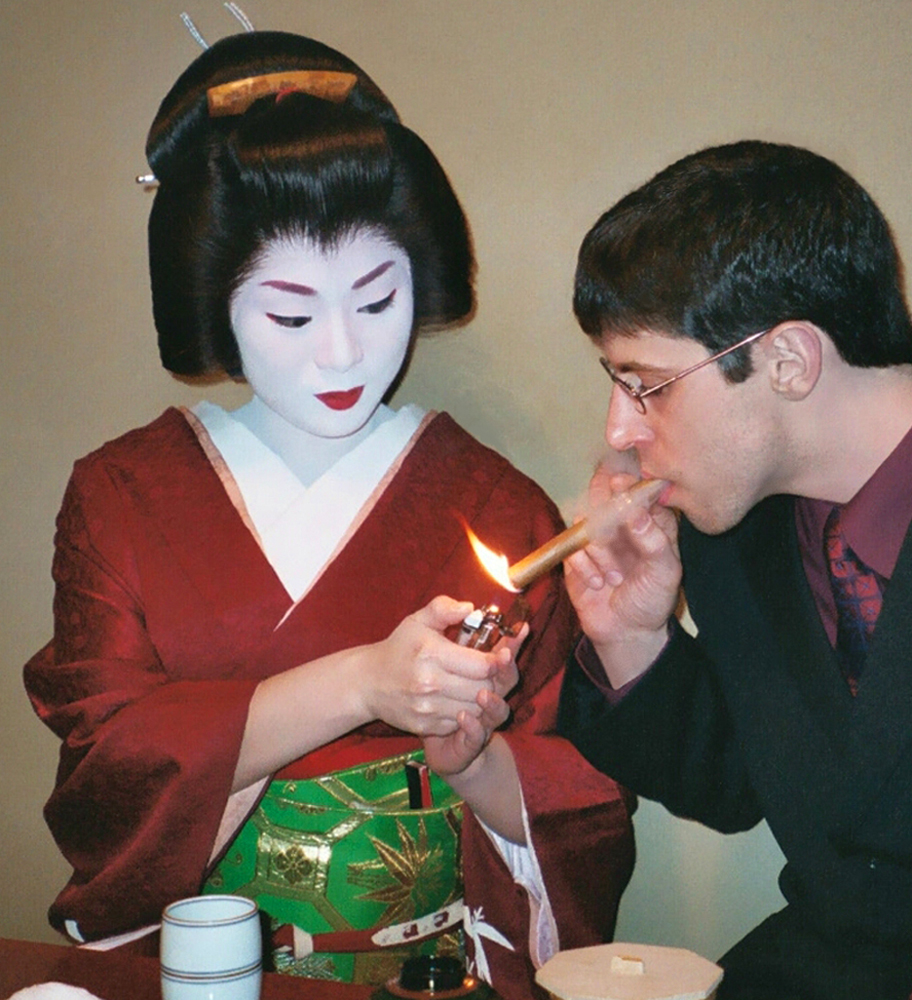
Geisha were forbidden to sell sex but have mistakenly become a symbol of Japanese sexuality in the West because prostitutes in Japan marketed themselves as "geisha girls" to American military men.

A frequent focus of misconceptions in regard to Japanese sexuality is the institution of the geisha. Rather than a prostitute, a geisha was a woman trained in arts such as music and cultured conversation, who was available for non-sexual interactions with her male clientele. Geisha differed from their patrons' wives because, except for the geisha, women were ordinarily not prepared for activity other than household duties. This social limitation was imposed on the majority of women in traditional society and produced a diminution in the pursuits that women could enjoy. This limitation also impacted the ways that a man could enjoy the company of his wife. The geisha fulfilled the non-sexual social roles that ordinary women were prevented from fulfilling, and for this service they were well paid. That being said, the geisha were not deprived of opportunities to express themselves sexually and in other erotic ways. A geisha might have a patron with whom she enjoyed sexual intimacy, but this sexual role was not part of her role or responsibility as a geisha.

== Fetish scene ==
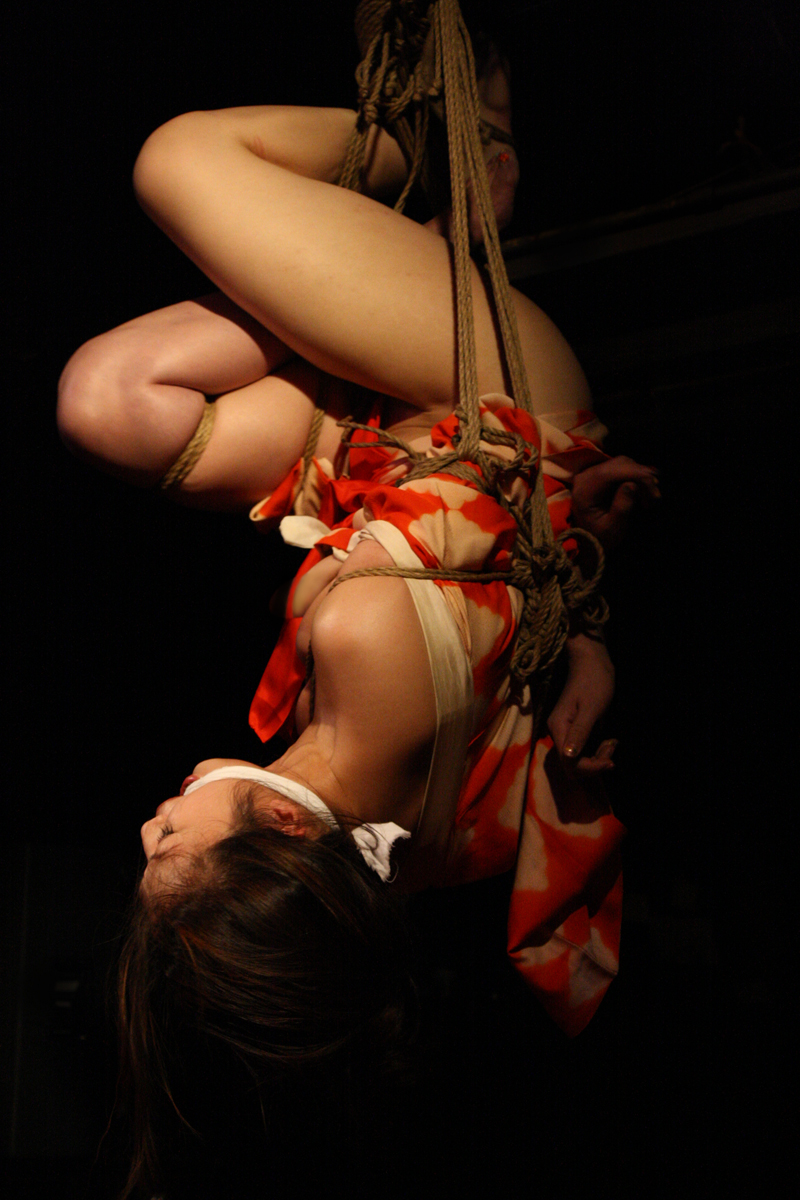
Naka Akira's show at Toubaku features a half naked woman suspended upside down using intricate rope bondage.

Japan has a thriving fetish scene, especially BDSM fetishes. Indeed, Japanese game show-style videos have been created which center around the use of fetishes. Among the unique sexual fetishes the Japanese have produced are tentacle erotica and the BDSM fetishes shibari, bukkake, omorashi and tamakeri.

Food play is known as wakamezake, which involves nyotaimori, the act of presenting food (typically sushi) on a nude female body. This act has become an icon of Japanese food play. Largely due to Western influence, the attraction to very large breasts (bakunyū) has emerged as a fetish in Japan. Lolicon refers to the sexual attraction to seemingly underage girls.

Shibari, as it is typically referred to in the West, is known as kinbaku (also sokubaku) in Japanese and refers to the erotic art of tying people up. Originally in Japanese history the martial art Hojōjutsu, which trained people in tying others up or restraining them with rope, was practiced and developed over long periods of time. Because being tied up with a knot was considered extremely shameful, the art emphasized many techniques for restricting noble men and others of high rank without actually using any knots. However, with the advent of BDSM in modern Japan came an eroticized offspring of Hojōjutsu, called kinbaku, that focuses more on gentler holds and uses the historical shame of being tied up to further humiliate the "bottom".

Today, Hojōjutsu is not commonly practiced and is considered by some to be a dying art, but shibari thrives in the BDSM world and has profoundly influenced the bondage scene, integrating itself into many western schools, creating dozens of fusions of styles, and being practiced by itself in BDSM communities worldwide. Kinbaku has introduced to the West ties and positions that specifically apply pressure on the bottom's erogenous zones, asymmetric uses of patterns that give the bottom two uncomfortable positions to choose from, emphasizing simpler, more elegant ties over the elaborate, decorative knots of the West, as well as use of specific katas (forms) and aesthetic rules.

== Homosexuality ==
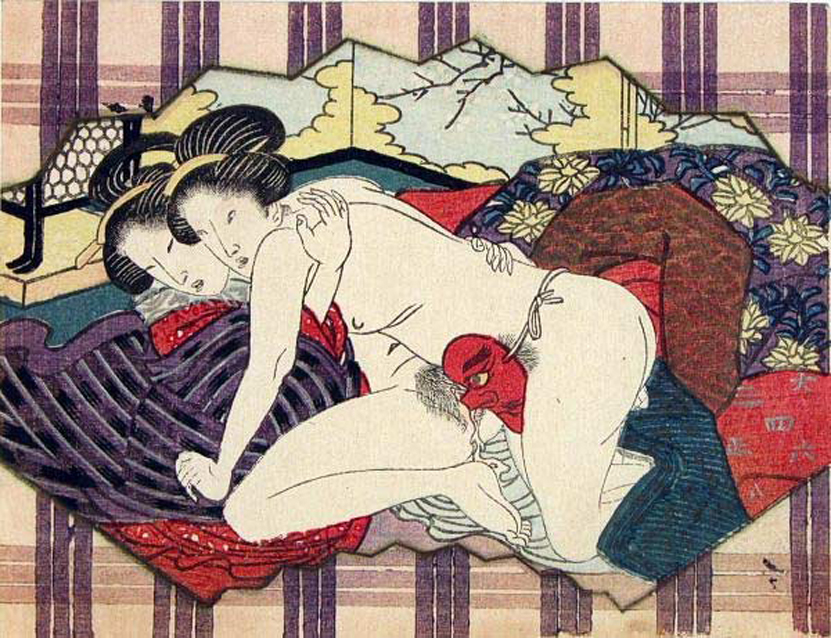
A historic shunga woodblock printing from Japan depicting two women having sex. One has tied a tengu mask around her waist, and penetrates her partner using its long nose.

Historically, the Shinto religion "had no special code of morals and seems to have regarded sex as a natural phenomenon to be enjoyed with few inhibitions." While Shinto beliefs are diverse, Japanese Shintoism does not condemn homosexuality. In Buddhist monasteries, nanshoku relationships were typically pederastic between a monk, priest or abbot and a prepubescent or adolescent acolyte. In the samurai class, it was customary for a boy in the wakashū age category to undergo training in the martial arts by apprenticing to a more experienced adult man. The man was permitted, if the boy agreed, to take the boy as his lover until he came of age; this relationship, often formalized in a "brotherhood contract", was expected to be exclusive, with both partners swearing to take no other (male) lovers.

In Japan, sodomy was restricted by legal prohibition in 1873. However, the provision was repealed only seven years later by the Penal Code of 1880, which relied on the Napoleonic Code. Confucian thought and the government's desire to appear "civilized" influenced the way that homosexuality was viewed by both the Japanese state and by the population at large during the Meiji period.

Despite recent trends that suggest a new level of tolerance, as well as open scenes in more cosmopolitan cities (such as Tokyo and Osaka), Japanese gay men and lesbian women often conceal their sexuality, and many marry persons of the opposite sex to avoid discrimination.

=== Politics and law ===
Japan has no laws against homosexual activity and has some legal protections for gay individuals, but the Japanese government does not recognize same-sex marriage. In 2008 however, a law was passed allowing transgender people who have gone through sex reassignment surgery to change their sex on legal documents.

Consensual sex between adults of the same sex is legal, but some prefectures set the age of consent for same-sex sexual activity higher than for opposite-sex sexual activity.

Despite recommendations from the Council for Human Rights Promotion, the Diet has yet to include protections against discrimination for sexual orientation in the country's civil rights code. Although national civil rights laws do not protect against discrimination based on sexual orientation, some local governments have enacted such laws. For example, the government of Tokyo has passed laws that ban discrimination in employment based on sexual identity. The major political parties express little public support for gay rights issues.

== AIDS, other STDs, and contraceptives ==
In the years since the world first became aware of the AIDS virus, like most industrialized nations, Japan has not suffered the high rates of AIDS disease and death that characterize some nations in Africa and South-East Asia. As of 2007 only about 100 people die each year in Japan due to AIDS. In 1992, the government of Japan justified its continued refusal to allow oral contraceptives to be distributed in the country on the belief that it would lead to reduced condom use and increased transmission of AIDS. As of 2004, condoms accounted for 80 percent of birth control used in Japan. This might explain Japan's comparably lower incidence of AIDS.

== Decreasing sexual activity ==
Sexual desire and sexual activity have been declining in Japan as other developed countries for years, and this is a cause of Japan's decreasing birth rate. Because Japan has one of the lowest birth rates in the world and its population is on course to shrink dramatically by the middle of the century, every five years the government carries out a detailed survey of attitudes to sex and marriage. The studies and surveys have reported loss of sexual drive across several demographics, from adolescent men and women, to married couples. In 2010, the 14th Japanese National Fertility Survey was conducted by the National Institute of Population and Social Security Research. Singles between the ages of 18 and 34 who are not involved in a romantic relationship and do not want one amounted to 28% for men and 23% for women. It was also found that 28% of men and 26% of women aged 35–39 had no sexual experience. However, the possibility of response bias should be taken into consideration with these figures.

In 2010, another survey published The Japanese Association for Sex Education Research Journal found that 40.8% (up from 34.6% in 2006) of marriages in Japan could be classified as "sexless", which the Japan Society of Sexual Sciences generally defines as "engaging in sex less than once a month, despite not suffering from any health-related conditions". Among the top reasons married couples cite for not having sex, is that after children are in the picture (couples are even discouraged from having intercourse while pregnant), sex can decrease markedly or even become nonexistent for a habit-forming period of time. About 1 in 5 couples say they simply view sex as a nuisance, a small number cite the lack of private space, because elderly or the children often sleep on just the other side of paper-thin walls. Some are too stressed out from work, others have "more fun things to do". There is also a tendency among Japanese married couples to feel an aversion to sex with their spouse because they've come to feel that they have more of a relative/sibling relationship, and accordingly cannot see their spouse as a sexual partner anymore. Additionally, 36.1% of males and 58.5% of female respondents aged 16 to 19 surveyed described themselves as "indifferent or averse" towards having sex. A near 18% and 12% increase respectively, since the survey was last conducted in 2008. It was also reported that 83.7% of men who turned 20 that year were not dating anyone, with 49.3% stating they had never had a girlfriend. 59% of female respondents of the same age group responded similarly, a 12% increase from the 2008 survey.

Some scholars have criticized the media reporting and scholarship on so-called "sexless" Japan as many of these surveys exclude LGBT people, divorcees, widows, single parents or people who have married between the ages of 18 and 30. This necessarily exaggerates the number of virgins by excluding a huge segment of the sexually active population. The surveys research methodology is also outdated and based on the faulty assumption that everyone is heterosexual and has never divorced or had a child out of wedlock. The motivations behind the studies are also questionable since they are linked to government attempts to justify the funding of programs for arranged marriage partners.

In a global context, a 2005 Sex Survey of 317,000 people in 41 countries conducted by Durex, the largest condom manufacturer in the world, found that the Japanese had the least sex in the world, at 45 times a year, with the second-to-last country of Singapore averaging 73 times a year, and the world average at 103 times a year. Additionally the survey reported that only 24% of Japanese respondents said they were happy with their sex lives, compared to the global average of 44%.

The reasons for this decline in sex interest are still widely discussed; There are many theories and different contributing factors. A large part of it may be attributed to the fact that in most respects, men and women live very separate lives socially, and there is little relaxed contact with the opposite sex outside of school ties or friends from the office, and in turn, less opportunity to freely mingle without commercial transaction through the sex-industry. This, combined with young men's growing reliance on pornography, can be thought to have a large impact on the real-world sex interest due to its “overstimulating” effect.

== See also ==
- Aging of Japan
- Air sex
- Akasen
- AV idol
- Burusera
- Celibacy syndrome
- Ecchi
- Enjo kōsai
- Happening bar
- Hentai
- Herbivore men
- Love hotel
- Marriage in Japan
- Mizu shōbai
- Nanpa
- Nightwork: Sexuality, Pleasure, and Corporate Masculinity in a Tokyo Hostess Club
- No-pan kissa
- Nuru (massage)
- Oiran
- Otoko-machi Map
- Pink Box: Inside Japan's Sex Clubs
- Pornography in Japan
- Prostitution in Japan
- Same-sex marriage in Japan
- Sexual minorities in Japan
- Telekura
- Tobita Shinchi
- Types of prostitution in modern Japan
- Women in Japan
- Yobai
- Yūkaku
