= Gay Japan News =

Web-based news service in the Japanese language

GayJapanNews (Japanese: ゲイジャパンニュース, romanized: Geijapan'nyūsu) is a web-based news service in the Japanese language specializing in LGBT issues from around the world. The service was launched in 2005 (21 years ago) to increase the visibility of gays and lesbians, whose presence is negligible in traditional media within Japan. The site is primarily in Japanese but with some English available. It was co-founded by Tom Paine and Hiroshi Mochizuki, who serves as editor. Staff members have been asked to comment on LGBT issues in Japan by news organizations such as the Asahi Shimbun, NHK, and The Japan Times. GayJapanNews has also held workshops and advocated for LGBT issues in Japan.

== See also ==
- Homosexuality in Japan
- LGBT rights in Japan
- List of LGBT events
- Mass media in Japan
- Sexual minorities in Japan
- Shinjuku ni-chōme, Tokyo
