= Umeda =

Umeda 梅田
- Business District
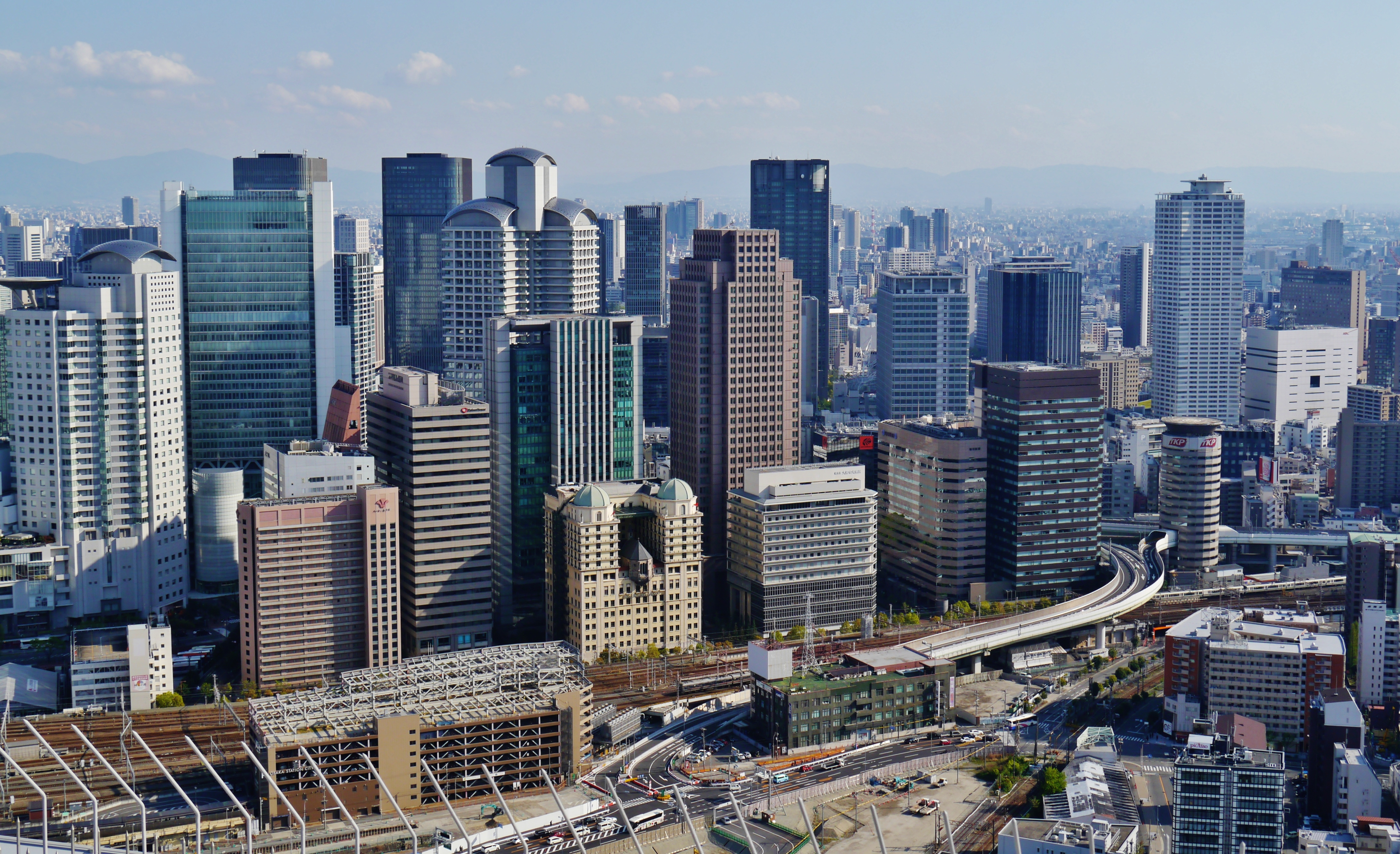
- The Umeda skyline

- Location within Japan
- Coordinates: 34°42′0″N 135°29′49.2″E
- Country: Japan
- Prefecture: Osaka Prefecture
- City: Osaka
- Ward: Kita-ku

Population
  - Total: 1,316
- Time zone: UTC+9 (Japan Standard Time)
- Postal code: 530-0001
- Area code: 6

Umeda (Japanese: 梅田) is a major commercial, business, shopping and entertainment district in Kita-ku, Osaka, Japan, where the city's main northern railway termini (Ōsaka Station, Umeda Station) are located. The district's name means "plum field".

== History ==
In Umeda, there was a historical grave site called Umeda Haka (Umeda Grave), it was one of the seven largest cemeteries of Osaka from the Edo period (1603–1868) until the first twenty years of the Meiji period (1868–1912). In 2020, survey teams for the Umekita redevelopment project discovered ancient burial remains of over 1,500 people. Experts say these remains were of commoners, not the aristocracy. They used several burial styles, both cremated as well as buried with enclosed wooden caskets, barrel-shaped open containers and earthenware coffins called kameganbo (turtle caskets). They found burial items such as pipes, clay dolls, rokusenmon (a set of six coins to pay passage across the Sanzu River which separates the world of the living and the afterlife) and juzudama (rosary-style prayer beads). A stone wall separated a mass grave with skeletons that were only covered by soil. These are suspected to have died in a plague.

Until the 1870s, the area which is now Umeda was agricultural land. The area was reclaimed and filled in by the prefectural government in the 1870s to support the creation of the first Osaka Station. The word "Umeda" was previously written with different kanji characters; 埋田 (English: "buried field") to reflect this history. The name was changed to 梅田 (English: "plum field") without altering the pronunciation, likely due to negative connotations with the previous characters.

The original Osaka Station, a two-story red brick building, was opened in 1874, along with the first railway connecting Osaka and Kobe cities, and in 1876 an additional line to Kyoto. This was essentially the establishment of Umeda as a district. As industry in the area increased at the turn of the century, the station required expansion, so in 1901 the first station was demolished, and a larger station was built in the location where Osaka Station exists in a different form today. Hanshin Umeda station was constructed in 1906, followed by Hankyu Umeda Station in 1910, the Umeda subway station and Midosuji subway line in 1933 and Kitashinchi station in 1997. The current incarnation of Osaka Station was built in 1979, and underwent extensive renovation and reconstruction between 2005 and 2011, including the addition of the North Gate Building, a glass roof covering the tracks, and vast additional retail space providing shops, restaurants, sports centers and movie theatres to the area. For the 2011 re-opening, the station was re-branded Osaka Station City.

The construction of Umeda Sky Building in 1993 and the re-branding of Osaka Station City in 2011 transformed the Umeda area from a business district to a retail and tourist attraction.

== Politics and government ==
Umeda makes up a large part of the Kita Ward of Osaka city. Before 2019, the Kita Ward Electorate could elect three representatives to the Osaka Municipal Assembly. In 2018, the Kita electoral district was represented by Takayama Mia from the Osaka Restoration Association, Maeda Kazuhiko from the Liberal Democratic Party and Yamamoto Tomoko from Komeito.

The number of representatives from Kita was increased to four prior to the April 2019 Japanese unified local elections. The 2019 election saw all three incumbent representatives re-elected, along with Osaka Restoration Association newcomer Kuramoto Takayuki.

== Geography ==
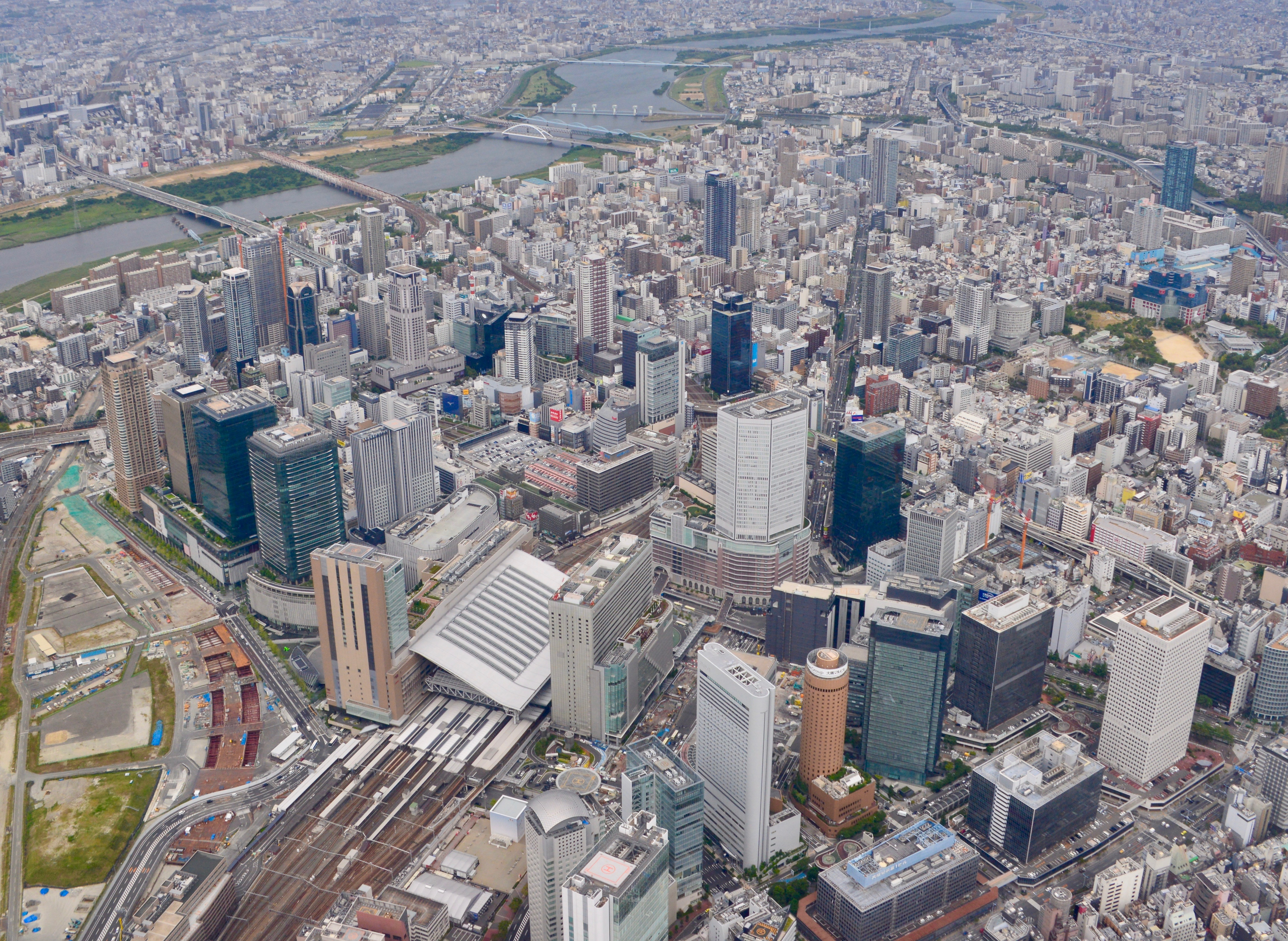
Umeda district in the broad sense

Umeda officially only covers JR West Osaka Station and the immediate area to its south and west, although "Umeda" is often used to describe much of the surrounding area, and is commonly used as a catch-all to refer to the downtown area of northern Osaka City.

In addition to JR Osaka Station, Kitashinchi Station, Hankyu Umeda Station and Hanshin Umeda Station are located in this area. Osaka Metro's Higashi-Umeda Station and Nishi-Umeda Station provide subway services to and from Umeda, making it a key transportation hub for the greater Osaka area. Underneath the main roads is an underground city which connects most of the local train stations and provides retailers, eateries and access to the area's department stores and the Dojima area of Kita ward.

Official districts of Umeda:

- Umeda 1-chome: Diamond District, Hanshin Department Store, Hilton Hotels & Resorts Osaka.
- Umeda 2-chome: Osaka Garden City, Herbis Osaka
- Umeda 3-chome: Osaka Station, Osaka Garden City, Nishi Umeda Square

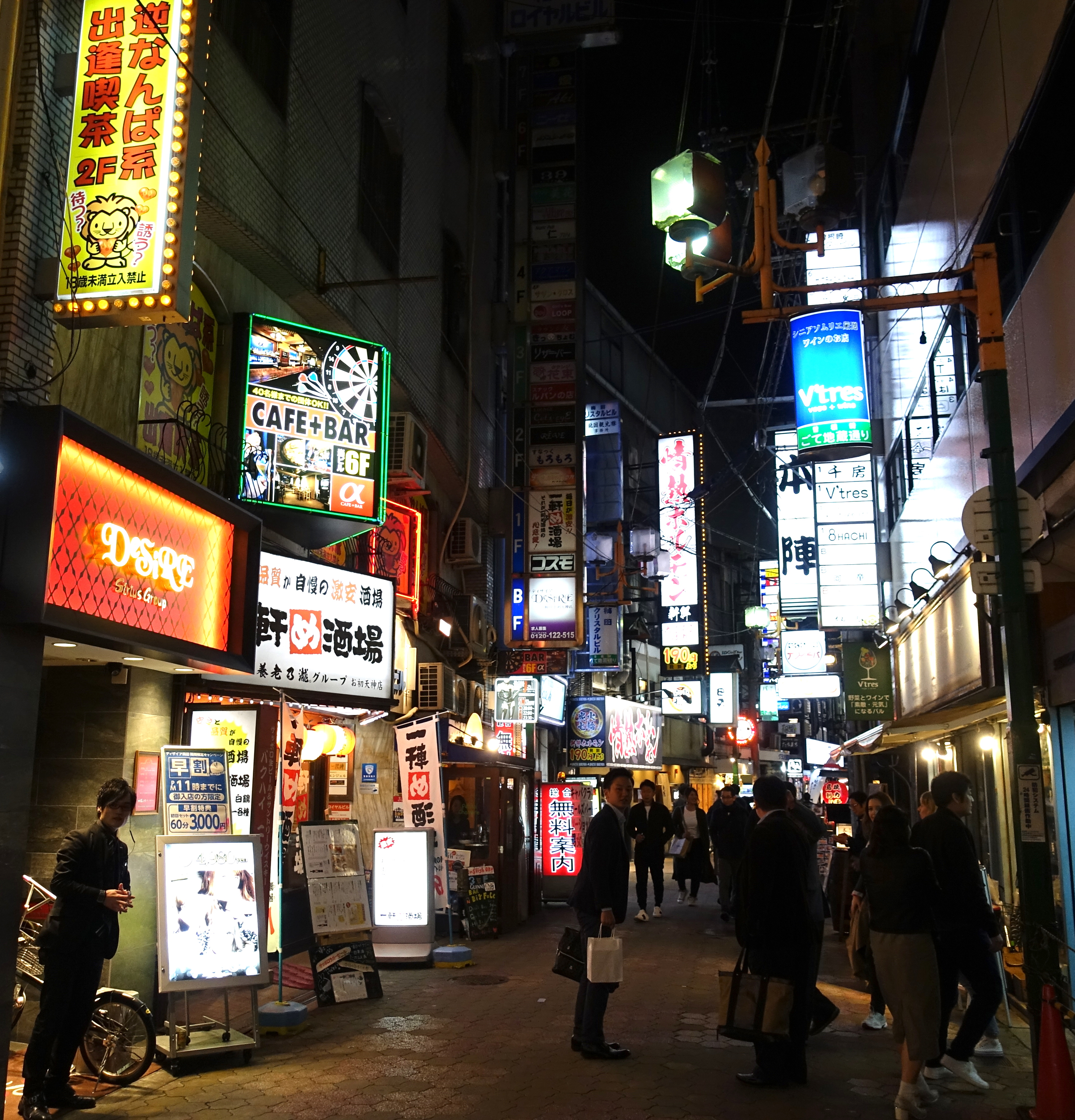
View of Sonezaki during the night

The area commonly referred to as Umeda, though outside of Umeda-proper, includes:

- Shibata
- Chayamachi
- Tsuruno
- Toyosaki 2-chome
- Kakuda
- Nakazaki 2-chome, 4-chome
- Komatsubara
- Doyama
- Banzai
- Taiyuji
- Togano
- Sonezaki
- Sonezaki Shinchi
- Dojima
- Dojimahama
- Nishitenma
- Oyodo-Naka 1-chome
- Oyodo-Minami 1-chome
- Ofukacho
- Nakatsu 1-chome, 5-chome

These areas are not officially part of the Umeda district, but may use "Umeda" on their buildings, business names, and in their advertising, and are commonly referred to unofficially as the Umeda area. An example of this is the Umeda Sky Building, one of Osaka's most recognizable landmarks, which resides not in Umeda but in Oyodo-Naka.

== Districts ==
=== Osaka Station City ===
Osaka Station City refers to the immediate area around Osaka Station, above and below ground. JR Osaka Station boasts the largest number of passengers in and out of any station in the JR West network, so Osaka Station City is the central hub of Umeda.

- South Gate Building
  - Daimaru Umeda
  - Hotel Granvia Osaka
- North Gate Building
  - Luqua
  - Luqua 1100
  - Osaka Station Cinema
  - Osaka Station JR Express Bus Terminal

=== Diamond District ===
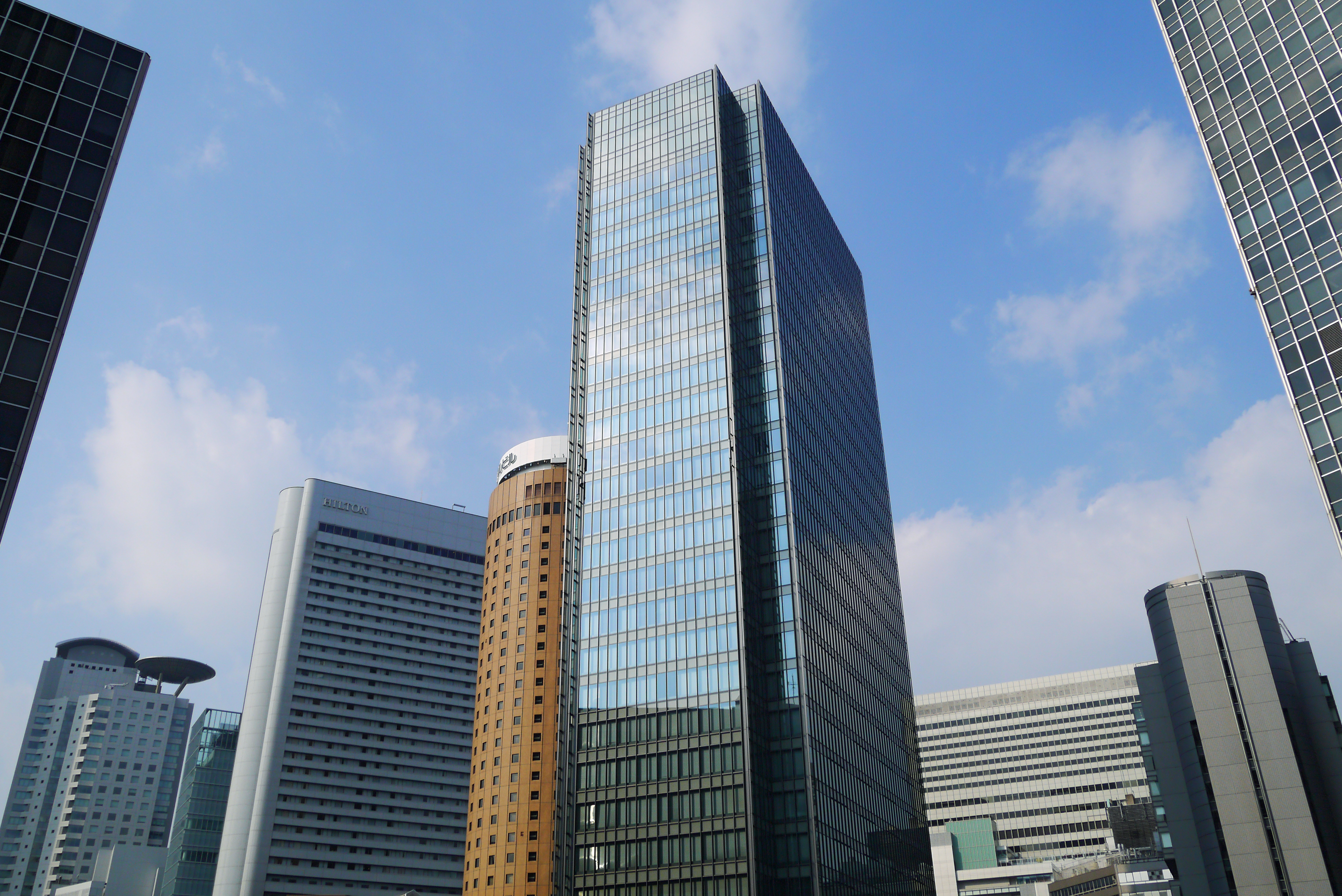
Buildings of the Diamond District

Umeda 1-chome

Diamond District refers to the area of Umeda 1-chome north of Hanshin Umeda Station and south of Osaka Station. A pentagonal section of Umeda 1-chome surrounded by the Midosuji and Sonezaki Dori roads, which resembles a diamond on the map. The price of land within this area is among the highest in Osaka, so it has come to be known as the "Diamond District". The area contains some of the largest skyscrapers in Osaka, department stores and recognizable buildings. The Osaka Maru Building has become a symbol of Umeda, due to its early construction and unique cylindrical shape.

- Osaka Umeda Twin Towers South
- Hanshin Department Store
- Hilton Plaza Osaka
- Osaka Maru Building
- Osaka Station 1st Building
- Osaka Station 2nd Building
- Osaka Station 3rd Building
- Osaka Station 4th Building

=== Nishi-Umeda ===
Umeda 2-chome / Umeda 3-chome / Osaka Garden City

Nishi-Umeda refers to the area of Osaka Garden City in Umeda 2-chome and 3-chome. The Nishi-Umeda district is the main business center of the Umeda area. Nishi-Umeda hosts the facilities of the Ritz Carlton Osaka, Mainichi Shimbun main office and many corporate headquarters for western Japan, it is easily accessible underground via Hanshin Umeda Station and serviced by the Osaka Metro subway system. The comparatively high concentration of tall buildings in Nishi-Umeda (and neighboring Dojima and Nakanoshima) form a prominent skyscraper district.

- Nishi-Umeda Square (event space, former location of Osaka Central Post Office)
- Herbis Osaka
  - The Ritz-Carlton Osaka
  - TBS Kansai Branch Office
  - Hankyu Corporation Head Office
- Herbis ENT
  - Osaka Shiki Theater
  - Mitsubishi Corporation Kansai Branch Office
- Hilton Hotels & Resorts Plaza Osaka (Hilton Plaza West)
- Mainichi Shimbun Building
- Daiwa House Osaka Building
- Osaka Central Hospital
- Hotel Monterey Osaka
- Hearton Hotel Nishi Umeda
- Breeze Tower
  - Nippon Ham Head Office
  - Bayer Japan Corporate Headquarters
  - All Nippon Airways Osaka Branch
  - Fuji TV Kansai Branch Office
  - Yahoo! Osaka Branch Office

=== Hankyu Umeda/Kita-Umeda ===
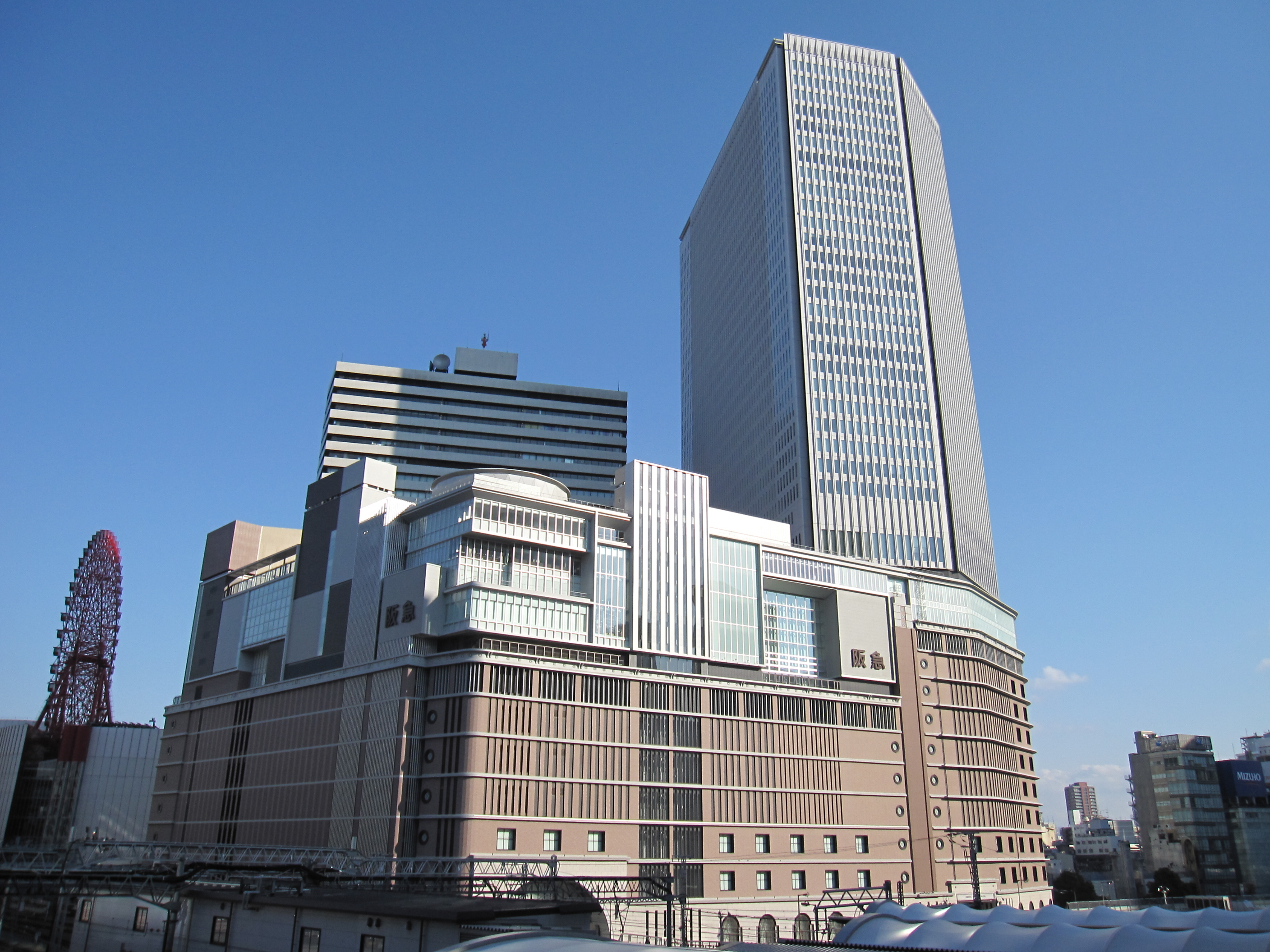
Hankyu Department Store Umeda Main Store

Chayamachi

Shibata 1-chome, Kakuda, Chayamachi, Tsuruno, Nishi-Nakazaki 2-chome

The Hankyu Umeda/Kita-Umeda district is the area of Umeda immediately surrounding Hankyu Umeda Station, the largest terminal of the Hankyu Corporation. The area extending to the east and north of the station hosts many buildings owned or funded by the Hankyu Corporation, so it is colloquially referred to as Hankyu-mura (lit:Hankyu village). Buildings such as the HEP Five building and Ferris wheel, Hankyu Mens department store, TOHO Cinemas, the Hankyu Grand Building, Hankyu Sanbangai shopping street, a string of antique book and art sellers, and the main branch of Hankyu Department Store, a 187 meter, 41-story building.

The west side of Hankyu station hosts hotels, restaurants, fitness clubs, and the Hankyu Corporation's headquarters. The area to the northeast of the station has been rapidly developing since the 1990s. The Chayamachi area, in particular, is growing quickly since the construction of NU Chayamachi shopping mall.

- Hankyu Umeda Station
  - Hankyu Sanbangai
  - Kinokuniya Bookstore Umeda Main Store
- Umeda Hankyu Building
  - Hankyu Department Store Umeda Main Store
  - Toshiba Kansai Branch Office
- Hankyu Terminal Building
- Hankyu Grand Building
- Osaka New Hankyu Hotel
- HEP NAVIO
  - Hankyu Men's Osaka
  - TOHO Cinemas Umeda
- HEP Five
- Yanmar Flying Y Building
  - UNIQLO Osaka
- NU Chayamachi
- Hankyu Corporation Head Office
- Maruzen/Junkudo book store

=== Osaka Station North ===
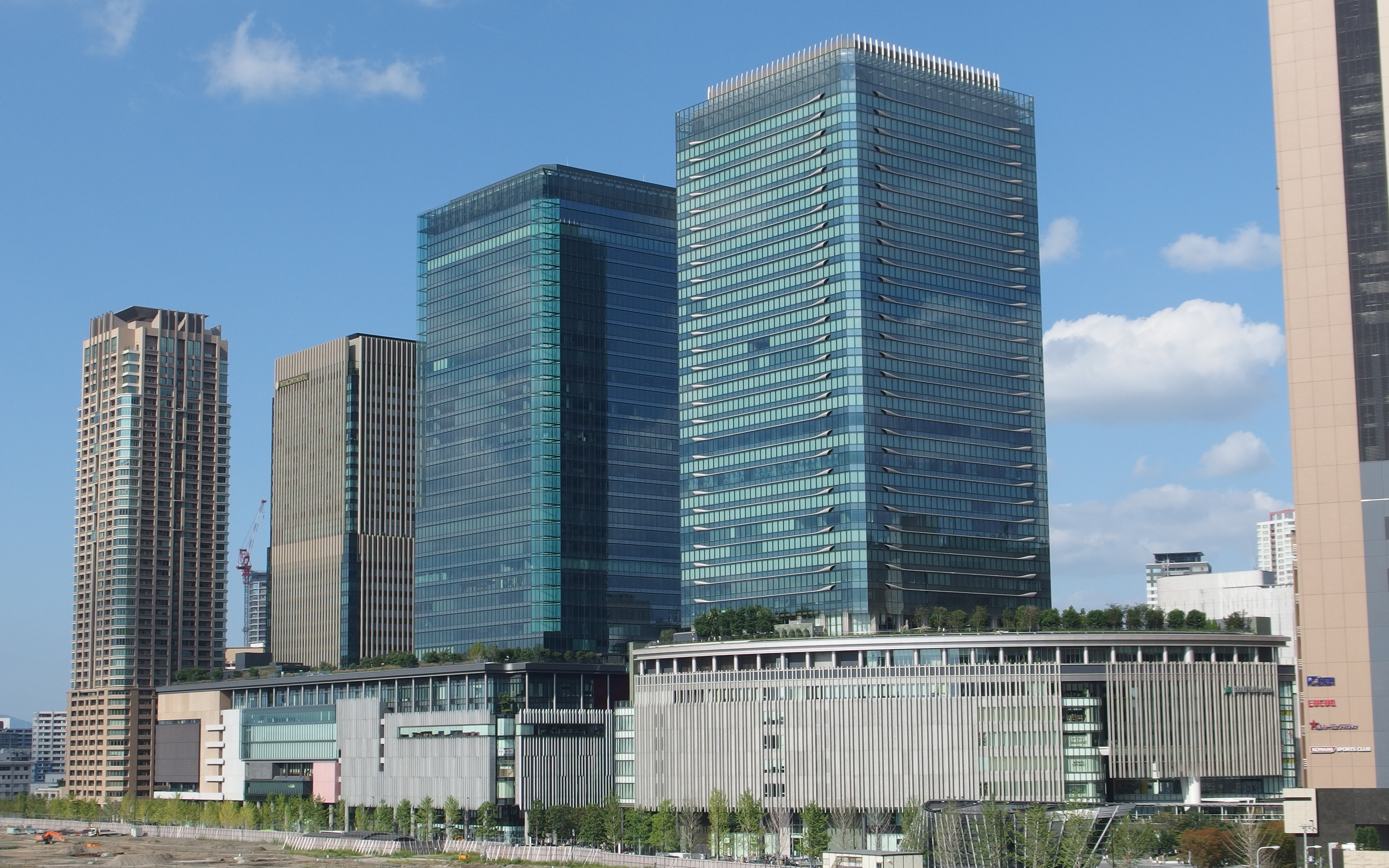
Grand Front Osaka

Ofukacho, Shibata 2-chome

The area to the north of JR Osaka Station. This area hosts the Seiseikai Nakatsu Hospital, JR West Japan Headquarters, and JR Umeda Freight Station. Since large-scale redevelopment is being undertaken in the area, land prices have been rising, and now Obukacho 4-chome has become the site with the highest land prices in West Japan. The area's rise has been attributed to the opening of the large Yodobashi Camera electronics department store in 2001, and since then other large developments such as Grand Front Osaka and a satellite campus of Osaka University have been completed. It is commonly called "Umekita".

- Grand Front Osaka
  - Kirin Osaka Branch
  - Mitsubishi Electric Kansai Branch Office
  - Fuji Electric Kansai Branch Office
  - Square Enix Osaka Office
  - Intercontinental Hotel Osaka
- Yodobashi Camera Umeda
- JR West Headquarters
- Seiseikai Nakatsu Hospital

=== Higashi-Umeda ===
Komatsubara, Hoyama, Sonezaki, Taiyuji, Togano, Doyama-cho

Located to the east of JR Osaka Station, it is a less-developed area of Umeda, with fewer skyscrapers, and generally far smaller buildings. Higashi-Umeda is known for its low-cost retailers in the covered Hankyu Higashidori and Sonezaki Ohatsutenjin shopping streets. The area boasts a bustling nightlife, with Japanese izakaya bars, restaurants, arcades, sex shops, love hotels and pachinko parlors. The area hosts the Tsuyu-no-Tenjinsha shinto shrine. Doyama-cho is one of Japan's few LGBT districts, and known to be the home to one of the largest homosexual communities in west Japan.

- NAMCO Umeda Store
- TOHO Cinemas
- Don Quijote Umeda Main Store
- Round One Game Center
- Hankyu Higashidori Shopping Street
- Sonezaki Ohatsutenjin Shopping Street
- Tsuyu-no-Tenjinsha Shrine

=== Kitashinchi ===
Kitashinchi was a high-class entertainment district of Osaka until the end of the bubble era, at which point its reputation decreased. It has been known as a red light district since the Edo period. The area hosts restaurants, karaoke, hostess clubs, snack bars, brothels, and pole dance bars. The area is famous for its kushikatsu restaurants.

Tōru Hashimoto, former mayor of Osaka and Governor of Osaka Prefecture, while working as a lawyer in the Tobitashinchi red light district in the south of Osaka, was revealed to have had an affair with hostesses in Kitashinchi before entering politics, a scandal that led to heavy criticism during political campaigns, along with allegations of ties to yakuza.

=== Underground City ===
The Osaka Underground City was completed in 1942 as a station underpass but has been dramatically expanded since. The total underground area extends from Chayamachi in the north to Dojima in the south, and Doyamacho in the east to Osaka Garden City in the west. The area connects the shopping malls of Whity Umeda and Diamor Osaka with the basements of Hankyu Sanbangai, Hankyu Department Store, Hanshin Department Store, JR Osaka Station, Osaka Ekimae Building, Osaka Toukoku Life Building, New Hankyu Building, and Herbis Osaka. More expansions to the underground city are planned to be completed by the end of 2022.

- Whity Umeda
- Diamor Osaka
- Dojima Underground Center

== University campuses ==
Many university satellite campuses and research centers opened in Umeda in the 2010s due to the convenience of public transport and proximity to the business district.

- Osaka University Umeda Satellite/Cultural Exchange Center
- Osaka Institute of Technology Umeda Campus
- Osaka Sangyo University Umeda Satellite Campus
- Kansai University Umeda Campus
- Kwansei Gakuin University Osaka Umeda Campus
- Kyoto University of Art & Design Osaka Satellite Campus
- Keio University Keio Osaka City Campus
- Kobe University Umeda Intelligent Laboratory
- Sophia University Osaka Satellite Campus
- Takarazuka University Osaka Umeda Campus
- Doshisha University Osaka Satellite Campus
- Nagoya University of Commerce & Business Osaka Umekita Campus
- Ritsumeikan University Osaka Umeda Campus
- Ryukoku University Osaka Umeda Campus

== Transportation ==
=== Rail ===
- JR West
  - Osaka Station: Tokaido Main Line (JR Kyoto Line, JR Kobe Line), Fukuchiyama Line (JR Takarazuka Line), Osaka Loop Line
  - Kitashinchi Station: JR Tozai Line
- Hankyu Railway
  - Umeda Station: Kobe Main Line, Takarazuka Main Line, Kyoto Main Line
- Hanshin Electric Railway
  - Umeda Station: Hanshin Main Line
- Osaka Metro
  - Umeda Station: Midosuji Line
  - Higashi-Umeda Station: Tanimachi Line
  - Nishi-Umeda Station: Yotsubashi Line

=== Roads and Highways ===
- Hanshin Expressway Route 11 Ikeda Line
- Midosuji
- National Route 1
- National Route 2
- National Route 25
- National Route 26
- National Route 163
- National Route 165
- National Route 176
- National Route 423 (Shinmido-suji)

== See also ==
- Namba
- Tourism in Japan
