= Kazuya Kawaguchi =

Japanese sociologist

Kazuya Kawaguchi (河口 和也, Kawaguchi Kazuya; born 1963) is a Japanese sociologist and a professor in the Faculty of Humanities at Hiroshima Shudo University. He has publicly identified as gay and conducts research on same-sex marriage and partnership declaration systems. Kawaguchi is also active in advocating for legal reforms by giving lectures across Japan. He played a central role in conducting Japanese nationwide surveys on public awareness of sexual minorities (such as LGBT individuals) in 2015 and 2019.

== Career ==
In the 1990s, Kawaguchi, along with Keith Vincent and Takashi Kazama, organized the "Identity Study Group" within the Association for the Lesbian and Gay Movement in Japan (now known as OCCUR). He co-edited the first anthology that translated queer theory from Western contexts into Japanese.

On February 12, 1991, OCCUR filed a lawsuit seeking damages against the Tokyo Metropolitan Government, which had denied LGBTQ individuals access to accommodations at the Fuchu Youth House the previous year. The plaintiffs in the case were Masashi Nagata, Takashi Kazama, and Masanori Kanda. Kawaguchi, as a member of OCCUR, actively participated in the legal battle. In March 1994, the Tokyo District Court ruled in favor of the plaintiffs, and in September 1997, the Tokyo High Court dismissed the metropolitan government's appeal.

== Works ==
- Kazuya Kawaguchi, Queer Studies [kuia sutadizu], 2003, Iwanami shoten, ISBN 9784000270045
