= Dragon Men (Tokyo) =

Gay bar in Tokyo, Japan

- Logo

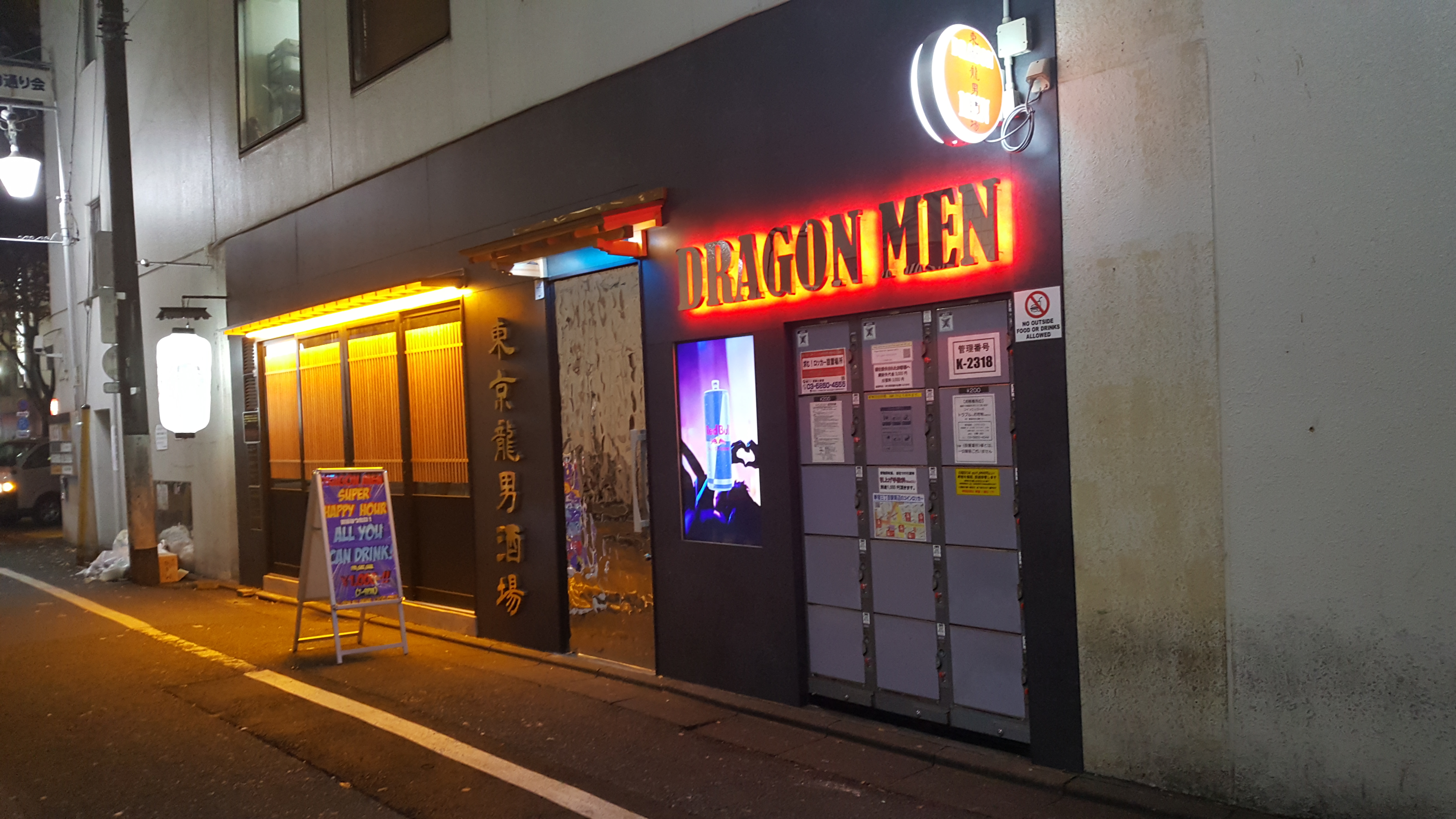
- The bar's exterior, 2019
- Interactive map of Dragon Men
- Address: 2 Chome-11-4 Shinjuku; Tokyo; Japan
- Coordinates: 35.690419320494776°N 139.70775209459995°E
- Type: Gay bar

Website
- dragonmen69.com

Dragon Men is a gay bar in Shinjuku, Tokyo, Japan.

== Description and reception ==
In 2009, John Polly of Logo TV's NewNowNext described Dragon Men as "one of Tokyo’s friendliest gay places, where you're as likely to meet chatty Aussie, Americans, Brits and Germans as well as Japanese locals who eagerly welcome gay tourists." He wrote, "The staff are funny and engaging, and the vibe is relaxed, playful and social. Sit along the slender S-shaped bar in the middle of the room beneath the two suspended bejeweled dragon sculptures hanging from the ceiling; or perch out on the streetfront patio seats... Dragon is a fun place to start your rounds of gay Tokyo barhopping on any night."

In 2016, Time Out Tokyo said, "Set in a large space on the edge of Nichome, Dragon Men's dancefloor gets packed at the weekends. The friendly crowd is a mix of Japanese and foreign men and women." Lucy Dayman included Dragon Men in The Culture Trip's 2018 list of Tokyo's eight best LGBT-friendly bars, writing, "If you're wandering around the area and have no idea where to go, just head straight to Dragon Men. A failsafe option, this very popular bar is filled with an eclectic mix of both Japanese and foreign patrons every night of the week. The music is a shameless mix of top 40 pop bangers and EDM. The weekends is when it's really happening; however, it does run a pretty nice little happy hour deal between 6pm to 8pm Monday to Thursday."

Fodor's says, "Tokyo's swankiest gay lounge, the neon-lit space would look right at home in New York or Paris."

== See also ==
- LGBT culture in Tokyo
- List of LGBTQ bars
