= Dōyamachō =

Dōyamachō 堂山町
- District
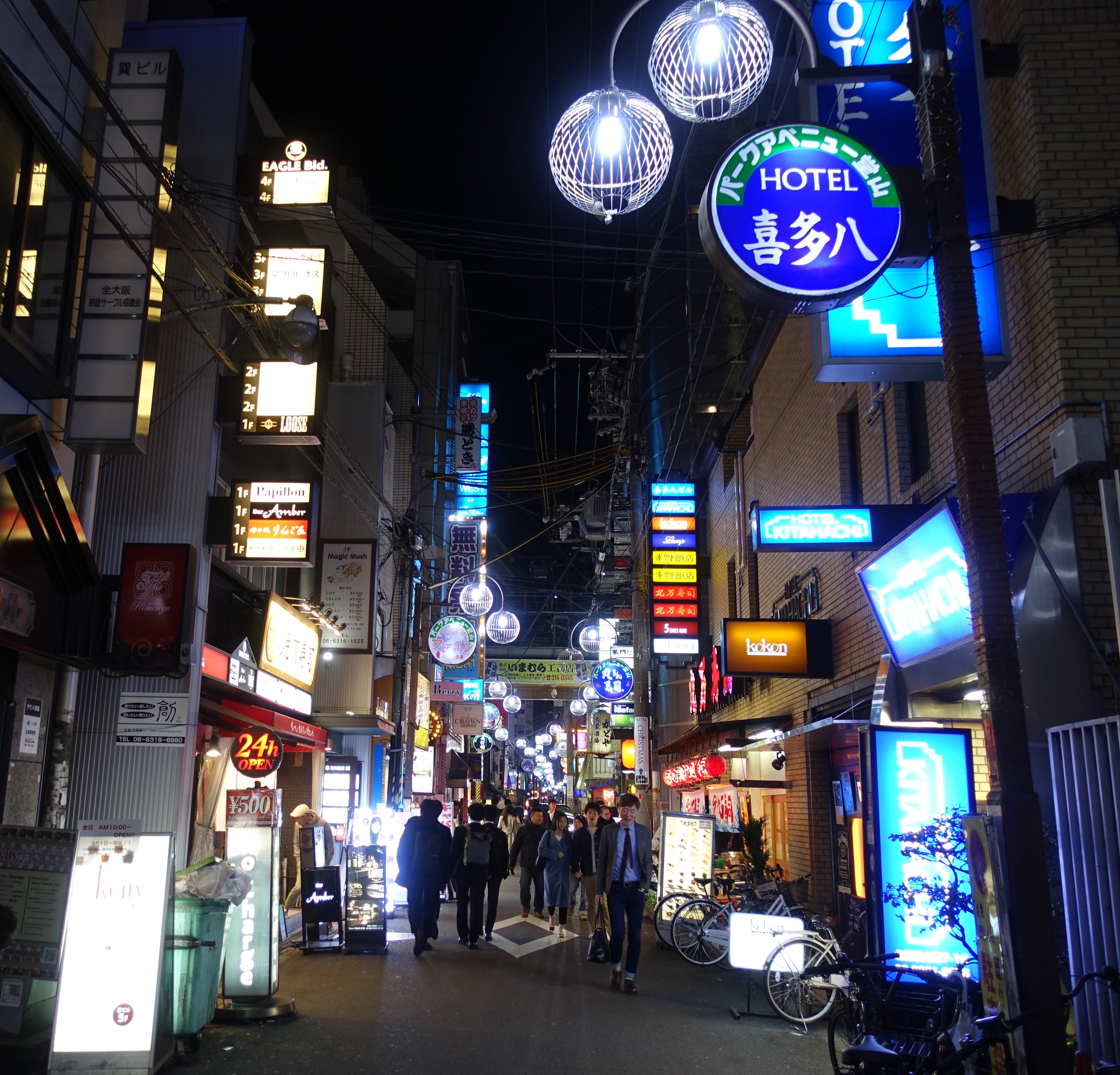
- Dōyama-chō during the night
- Interactive map of Dōyamachō
- Coordinates: 34°42′11″N 135°30′10″E
- Country: Japan
- City: Osaka

Dōyamachō (Japanese: 堂山町) is a district in the Umeda area of Osaka, Japan. It is close to the JR Osaka and Umeda Station, many restaurants, bars, izakaya, karaoke, massage parlors, host clubs, hotels, and shops concentrate in the area. Many salarymen, OL (office ladies) and students stop by Dōyamachō to have fun in the evening before they go back home. It is one of the largest entertainment districts in Japan. Dōyamachō has attracted a gay scene at a smaller scale than Shinjuku ni-chōme in Tokyo.

== Location ==
Dōyamachō is about 500m east from JR Osaka Station and 300m east from Hankyu, Hanshin and Subway Umeda station. The area is called "Kita" or north of Osaka, and best known as a party town. There are three main streets in Doyama-Cho; Hankyu Higashi Dori Shotengai (Hankyu's Eastside Mall), Hankyu Higashi Naka Dori (Hankyu's Eastside Central Mall) and Park Avenue Doyama. There are a lot of business offices and business hotels in south side of Doyama-Cho. North side of Doyama-Cho started becoming a gay community in last 20–30 years.

== History ==
There were many luxury Japanese restaurants, sushi places, cabaret and jazz clubs targeting high-end business customers until the Japanese bubble economy burst of the early 1990s. However, since the real estate bubble crashed and many business headquarters have moved to Tokyo area, Osaka's economy lost its momentum. Many high-end bars or restaurants could not keep their business. Many usual restaurants, izakaya, pubs or adult entertainment businesses started their business to target general salary-man, OLs or students.

Recently, many tourists from foreign countries visit Dōyamachō which is introduced as an entertainment district in many travel guide books.

Dōyamachō also attracted gay communities. "Hokuou-Kan", one of the most popular sauna places, became very popular, and because of its convenient location, Dōyamachō became a hub of gay community in West Japan. However, unlike in Western gay towns, the gay community does not want to interact with the general public and the neighborhood association still hesitates to mark Dōyamachō as a gay friendly community.

== Characteristics ==
Besides bars, the area is also home to restaurants and cafes, shops, saunas, hotels, "host bars or clubs", massage parlours, and brothels of varying sizes and legality. Establishments vary in size, but many are limited to ten or fewer seats.

Much like in Tokyo, bars here are usually themed towards "types"—bears, salarymen, young guys etc. Many of the gay bars in Dōyamachō do not permit female customers. The few lesbian bars that can be found do not permit male customers. Mixed venues are few.

At most bars in this area, patrons usually sit at a counter and chat with the bartender. Karaoke is also popular, and gay monthly and pornographic magazines can be read at many establishments as well. Those who visit these small bars are usually regulars; since many bars operate on the "bottle keep" system, many customers may have their own bottle at their favourite bar. Loyalty to bars is returned by the bars organizing outings to onsen, hanami parties, picnics, gay sporting events, and so on. Many bars maintain large photo albums of customers, for customers, often taken at such events.

While most bar owners ("Mamas" or "Masters") are accommodating to new customers and to non-Japanese, the scene is largely geared towards regular, Japanese-speaking customers, and some venues discourage or prohibit non-Japanese from entering, regardless of their Japanese language abilities. A handful of establishments, in contrast, specifically target foreigners with advertising and information in English. These include Bar Physique and FrenZy Bar. While most bars have a cover charge system, these do not.

With the advent of the internet and less segregation, Dōyamachō is seeing a downturn in gay visitors. While weekends are busy, foreign visitors should not expect the same numbers as one would expect in a city of this size in the West. In recent times, more bars have opened aimed at straight men.

== Events ==
While Tokyo has been the site of numerous gay pride parades, Osaka has lagged in this regard. On October 22, 2006, Osaka hosted its inaugural Rainbow Parade, with more than 900 participants marching from Nakanoshima Park to Motomachi-Naka Park, near Namba Station. The 11th annual parade took place on October 1, 2016.

Mash (Men and Sexual Health Osaka) organize a yearly event called PLus+ promoting AIDS awareness. Taking place in Ogimachi Park, close to Dōyamachō, there is entertainment and drinks available. Organisers estimate more than 10,000 people participated in the 2007 event.

== See also ==
- Umeda
- LGBT rights in Japan
- Homosexuality in Japan
- Shinjuku ni-chōme, Tokyo
- Gay Japan News
- List of LGBT events
