= Aiiro Cafe =

Gay bar in Tokyo, Japan

- Logo
- Interactive map of Aiiro Cafe
- Address: Tokyo; Japan
- Coordinates: 35.69088880349383°N 139.70888216857438°E

Website
- aliving.net/aiirocafe/

Aiiro Cafe (stylized as AiiRO CAFE) is a gay bar in Tokyo, Japan.

== Description and reception ==
In 2015, Time Out Tokyo said of Aiiro, "The open-air café and bar, found on Shinjuku Ni-chome's main drag, is a laidback spot for an evening drink. Drag queens and 'go-go boys' perform on the weekends." In 2018, Lucy Dayman included Aiiro in The Culture Trip's list of "The 8 Best LGBT-Friendly Bars in Tokyo."

Frommer's contributor Beth Reiber gave Aiiro two out of three stars and wrote, "Where to start in Ni-chome? This is a good bet, right on Ni-chome's main drag, Naka-dori, and with an open facade that overflows with both gays and straights (but mostly gays) extending past the sidewalk to the street most nights. It’s a good place to gain bearings, check out the people parading past, and connect with the friendly crowd. A few drinks here, and you'll probably have a list of several places you want to hit next, but the bar’s website also gives excellent pointers."

Fodor's says, "Almost every great gay night out begins at this welcoming street-corner pub with a large red shrine gate, where the patrons spill out onto the street. This is the perfect place to put back a few cocktails, meet new people, and get a feeling for where to go next. The crowd is mixed and very foreigner-friendly." Lonely Planet says, "Aiiro (formerly known as Advocates) has long been a hub in Shinjuku-nichōme, and is a good place to get an evening started... The bar itself is teeny-tiny; the action happens on the street corner outside, which swells to block-party proportions when the weather is nice. Aiiro is welcoming to all and staff speak English. There's a rainbow torii (gate) out front; you can't miss it."

== See also ==
- LGBTQ culture in Tokyo
- List of LGBTQ bars
