= OCCUR =

Japanese LGBTQ rights organization

- 特定非営利活動法人アカー
- アカー
- Formation: 3 March 1986; 40 years ago
- Type: Non-profit organization
- Purpose: LGBT rights, HIV/AIDS activism
- Headquarters: Nakano, Tokyo
- Region served: Japan
- Representative of board of directors: Hiroshi Niimi
- Website: www.occur.or.jp
- Formerly called: 動くゲイとレズビアンの会 (Japan Association for the Lesbian & Gay Movement)

OCCUR (特定非営利活動法人アカー, lit. 'Designated Non-Profit Organization "OCCUR"') is a Japanese LGBT rights organization, founded in 1986. The organization is also involved in raising awareness of and providing medical treatment for HIV/AIDS.

== History ==
OCCUR was founded in 1986 as a split of ILGA Japan, founded by several young members dissatisfied with the group's leadership. The group became known for taking more proactive media and legal roles than prior organizations in Japan.

In February 1990, members of OCCUR stayed overnight at Fuchu Youth House for a study session. After members introduced themselves as members of a gay organization, they faced harassment from both other guests and the director of the facility, and were subsequently barred from using the facility by the director. In 1991, OCCUR filed a lawsuit against the Tokyo Metropolitan Government over discriminatory treatment, and the legal battle subsequently became a major focus for the group. Following two separate trials, OCCUR won the case against the government on 16 September 1997. The judgement has since been regarded as a major legal turning point on the issue of discrimination against sexual minorities in Japan.

On 2 December 1999, OCCUR was officially registered as a non-profit organization.

In 2018, the group's official name was changed from "Japan Association for the Lesbian & Gay Movement" to "OCCUR", which had already been in use since the organization was formed.

== See also ==
- Kazuya Kawaguchi
