= Shinjuku Ni-chōme =

District of Tokyo

Coordinates: 35°41′24″N 139°42′24″E

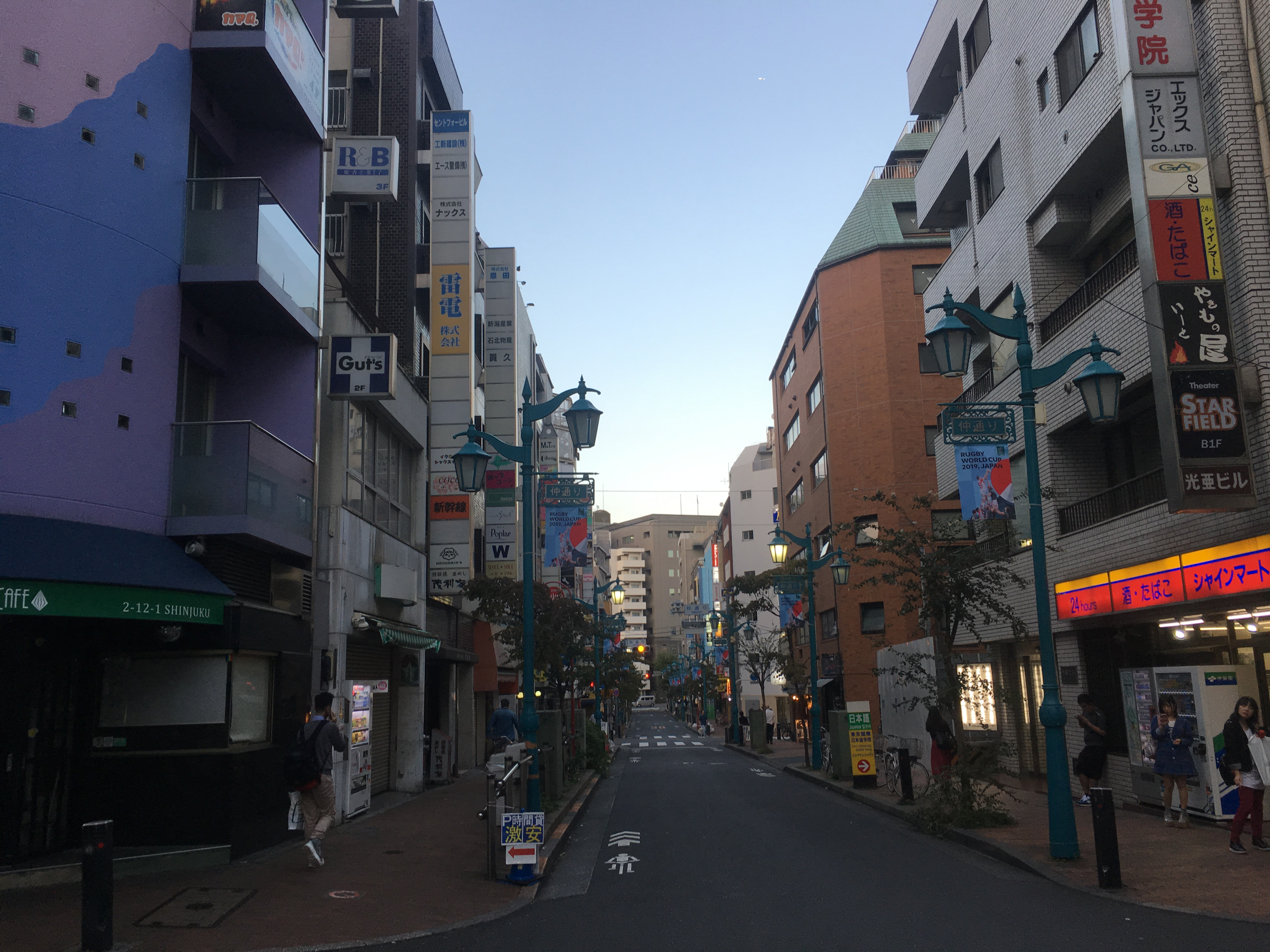
Shinjuku Ni-chōme, October 2019

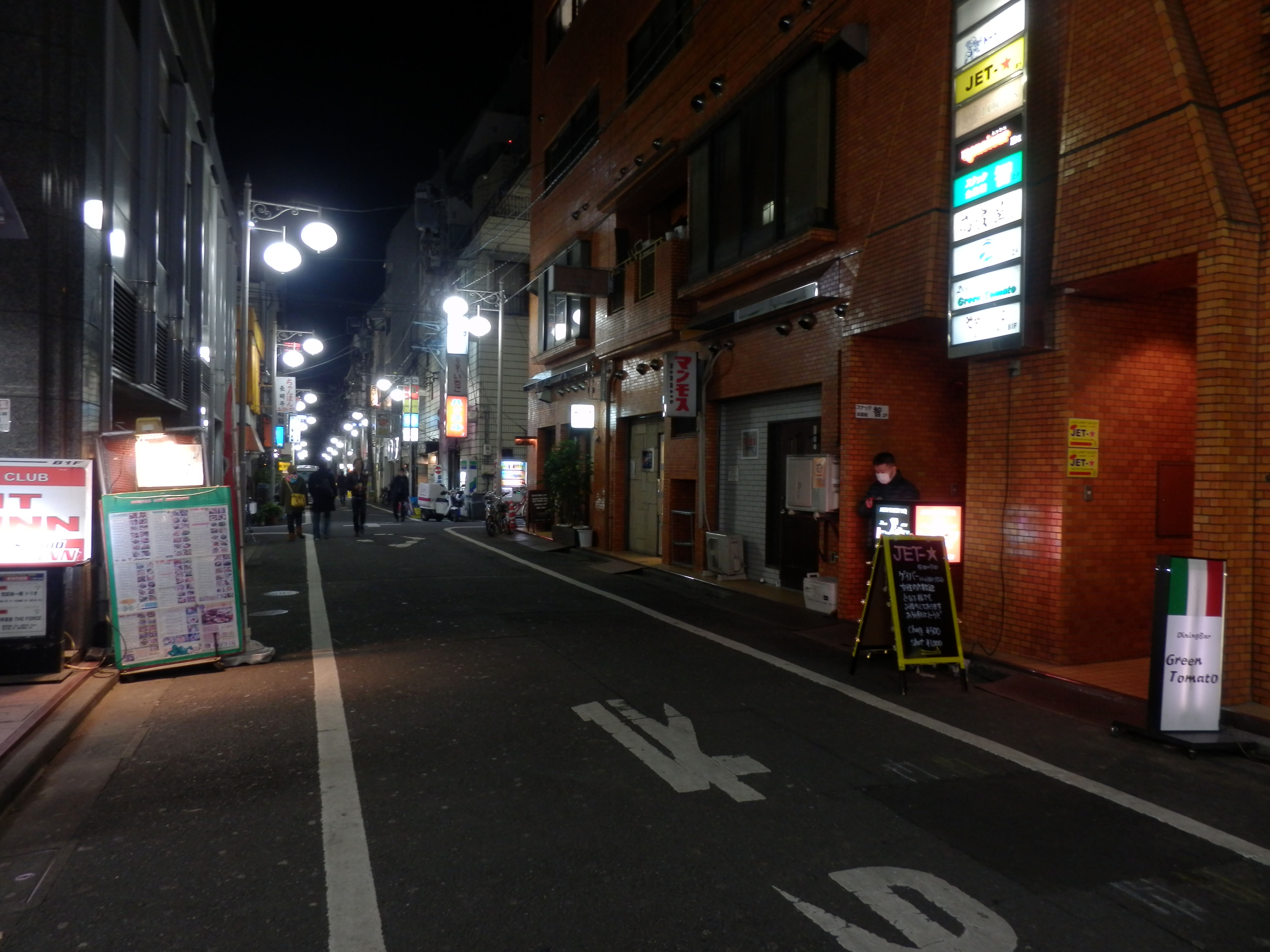
Shinjuku Ni-chōme at night, January 2013

Shinjuku Ni-chōme (新宿二丁目), referred to colloquially as Ni-chōme or simply Nichō, is Area 2 in the Shinjuku District of the Shinjuku Special Ward of Tokyo, Japan. With Tokyo home to 13 million people, and Shinjuku known as the noisiest and most crowded of its 23 special wards. Ni-chōme further distinguishes itself as Tokyo's hub of gay subculture, housing the world's highest concentration of gay bars.

Within close walking distance from three train stations (Shinjuku San-chōme Station, Shinjuku Gyoenmae Station, and Japan's busiest train station, Shinjuku Station), the Shinjuku Ni-chōme neighborhood provides a specialized blend of bars, restaurants, cafes, saunas, love hotels, gay pride boutiques, cruising boxes (hattenba), host clubs, nightclubs, massage parlors, parks, and gay book and video stores. In fact, within the five blocks centering on street Naka-Dōri between the BYGS building at the Shinjuku San-chōme Station and the small Shinjuku park three blocks to the east, an estimated 300 gay bars and nightclubs provide entertainment.

== History ==
The history of Ni-chōme as a gay neighborhood generally begins around the time of the American Occupation of Japan (1945–1952) and ties strongly to the fall of its red-light districts (akasen). As early as 1948, there is mention of a gay Shinjuku tea shop, and by the 1950s gay bars publicly emerged both in name and form in Ni-chōme.

Before 1957, Tokyo's red-light districts had flourished as legally-licensed centers for sex workers but, armed with a new constitution and an Equal Rights amendment, post-occupation Japanese women's Christian groups and the like successfully lobbied the Diet to pass the Prostitution Prevention Law in 1956. For the first time, prostitution in Japan became illegal. As the traditional sex industry left Ni-chōme, a gay subculture began to fill its place. By the late 1950s Ni-chōme was known for its popularity in the gay subculture, and a club scene began to emerge.

More recent years have seen the establishment of a counseling room for young gay men in 1976, the first AIDS candlelight vigil in 1986, the 1992 inauguration of Tokyo's annual International Lesbian and Gay Film Festival, Japan's first lesbian and gay pride parade in 1994, and the founding of its first gay community center, AKTA. Today Shinjuku Ni-chōme continues to provide a home base for many milestones in the history of Japan's LGBT community.

The Japan Times reported in February 2010 that the area was in decline, with the number of gay-oriented clubs and bars having declined by one-third. The decline was attributed to the construction of the nearby Tokyo Metro Fukutoshin Line, which has pushed up property values in the area, and the rise of the Internet.

In 2012, the dancing ban in night clubs began to be enforced in a number of popular clubs in Ni-chōme, including Arty Farty, Annex, Arch, and Aisotope. The ban was lifted in 2014 and now clubs like Dragon Men, Aisotope, and Arty Farty permit dancing.

== Scene specialization ==
The lifeblood of the gay neighborhood, the majority of Nichōme's hundreds of night clubs typically seat fewer than a dozen customers, who preferably represent a club's specialized subset of the gay subculture. In a society where traditionally most of the population was expected to marry, many LGBT Japanese choose to privately express their sexuality within the anonymity of specialty clubs in areas like Ni-chōme. To achieve this specialization, clubs are typically segregated by "scene". There are bars that cater specifically to the bear community, BDSM, muscular men, young men, butch and femme lesbians, etc.

While most bar owners do accommodate new and non-Japanese customers, the scene is primarily geared toward regular customers who are Japanese. Some venues discourage or prohibit non-Japanese from entering, regardless of Japanese language ability. At most bars in Shinjuku Ni-chōme, patrons sit at a counter and chat with the bartender. Karaoke is popular, and gay magazines are often available. Most bars offer a “bottle keep” (ボトルキープ) system, so many regular customers choose to keep their own bottles of liquor at their favorite bars. This loyalty is then repaid by bar-organized outings to onsen, hanami parties, picnics, and gay sporting events. Bars maintain large commemorative photo albums of these outings.

== Neighborhood events ==
Although few gay clubs in Ni-chōme can hold more than 100 customers, large gay events held throughout the year attract up to several thousand people to the area:

- Rainbow Reel Tokyo (previously known as Tokyo International Lesbian & Gay Film Festival)
- Tokyo Rainbow Pride (including a parade which usually begins near Shibuya Station, heading to Harajuku along Meiji Avenue and Omotesando, and ending in Yoyogi Park)

== Education ==
The Shinjuku City (the Shinjuku Ward) Board of Education (新宿区教育委員会) operates public elementary and junior high schools. Shinjuku 2-chome is zoned to Hanazono Elementary School (花園小学校) in Shinjuku 1-chōme and Yotsuya Junior High School (四谷中学校).

Most area public high schools are operated by the Tokyo Metropolitan Government Board of Education.

== See also ==
- LGBT culture in Tokyo
- Gay rights in Japan
- Homosexuality in Japan
- Gay village
- Doyama, Osaka, Japan
