= Pink Box: Inside Japan's Sex Clubs =

2006 non-fiction book by Joan Sinclair

- Author: Joan Sinclair
- Published: Harry N. Abrams
- Publication date: October 1, 2006
- Pages: 192
- ISBN: 9780810992597
- OCLC: 64336162
- Website: www.pinkboxjapan.com

Pink Box: Inside Japan's Sex Clubs is a book by photojournalist Joan Sinclair, chronicling her exploration of the secret world of fuzoku (prostitution) in Japan. Sinclair was joined by contributor James Farrer, a sociologist, who attempted to "place[s] the images in the context of contemporary Japanese culture".

Sinclair, a lawyer, describes being triggered to write the book by a comment she overheard ten years earlier, when she spent a year teaching English in Japan. Sinclair describes encountering and overcoming difficulties researching and gaining access to the clubs, usually reserved for Japanese-born patrons.
