= Otoko-machi Map =

Japanese country-wide map of gay establishments

The Otoko-machi Map (男街マップ, "men's city map") is a country-wide guide to Japanese gay establishments. It was established in 2007.

Published yearly, the guide, which is organized by prefecture and city, contains listings for bars, clubs, and host-bars, gay saunas, gay restaurants and bookstores, and other gay or gay-friendly establishments.

Listings for bars typically include a photograph of the owner or bartenders, as well as information on the type of customers preferred.

Most listings are accompanied by maps giving directions from the nearest train station.
