= Bottle keep =

Service in Japan

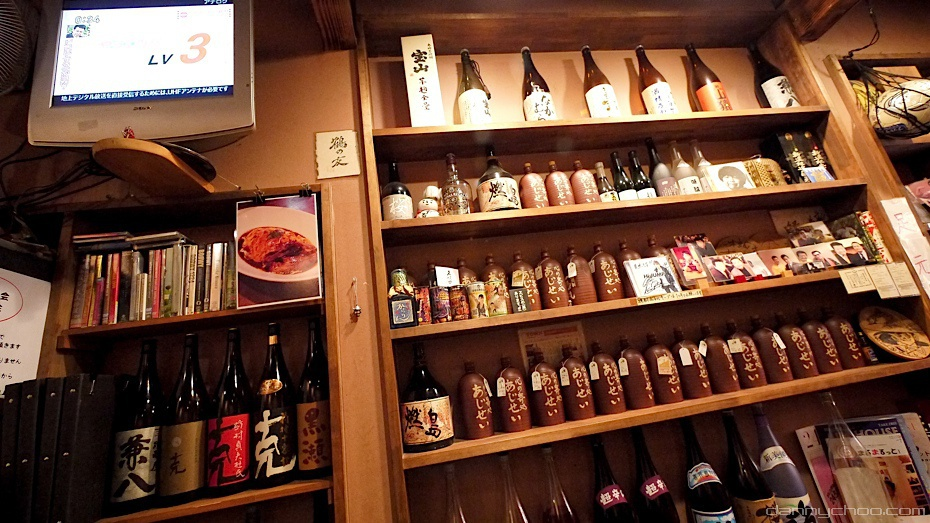
Patrons' bottles are kept on the shelf in a restaurant in Japan.

Bottle keep (ボトルキープ, botorukīpu, a wasei-eigo term), or bottle-keep, is a service which is provided at some Japanese drinking establishments where a patron can purchase a bottle of liquor and have the unfinished portion stored until a later visit. A bottle retained in this manner is called a keep bottle. The service is offered by a variety of drinking establishments, from casual izakaya to bars in some first-class hotels. For regular customers, the system is less expensive than paying for single drinks. Some restaurants and bars outside Japan have also adopted the service.
